= History of Wrocław after 1945 =

History of Wrocław after 1945 refers to the history of Wrocław since the end of World War II.

The post-war history of the city can be divided into four main periods:

- 1945–1948 – settlement and reconstruction,
- 1948–1981 – the shaping of its identity as a Polish city and its dynamic development,
- 1981–1989 – stagnation and recession following the introduction of martial law,
- since 1989 – the period after the fall of communism.

The beginning was marked by a change in state affiliation. The years from 1945 to 1948 saw settlement, the expulsion of Germans, and the intensive reconstruction of the city from war damage. In 1948, two important events took place: the World Congress of Intellectuals in Defense of Peace, attended by, among others, Pablo Picasso, and the Recovered Territories Exhibition. In 1952, the city's administrative system was reformed, introducing a district-based structure that remained in place until 1991, when smaller residential areas were established instead. New areas were incorporated into the city, with Wrocław reaching its final territorial shape in 1973.

The 1960s and 1970s saw significant urban expansion, particularly in housing development. In addition to large-panel housing estates built on the western and southern outskirts, unique architectural structures, such as the Trzonolinowiec, were constructed. In 1963, Wrocław experienced an outbreak of smallpox. The 1960s and 1970s were also a time of cultural growth, with theaters such as Pantomime and Laboratorium operating in the city. After 1980, Wrocław became a stronghold of Solidarity, and during martial law, mass demonstrations took place. In the 1980s, the Orange Alternative social movement emerged. Pope John Paul II visited the city in 1983 and again in 1997. In 1991, the city's administrative system was restructured, abandoning the district system. New local authorities were elected, and Bogdan Zdrojewski became the first non-communist mayor. In 1997, Wrocław was struck by the Central European flood, which submerged nearly 40% of the city. After 2000, Wrocław hosted two major sporting events: UEFA Euro 2012 and The World Games 2017. The public transportation system expanded, with an enlarged tram network and further extensions planned.

In the 2010s, Wrocław faced serious challenges related to urbanization, including demographic shifts in its districts, air pollution, and traffic congestion.

== 1945–1948 ==
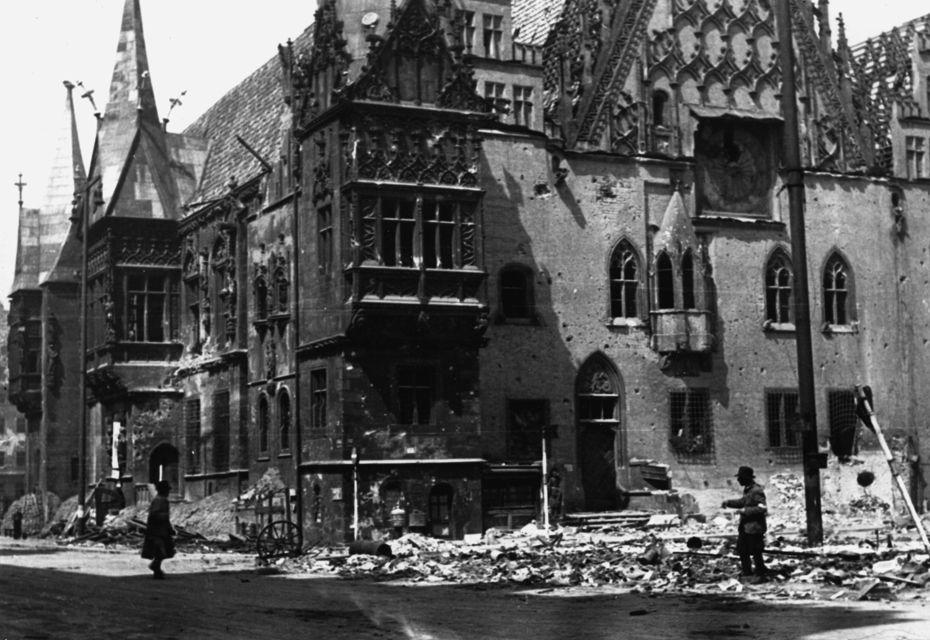
Devastated town hall in 1945

This period was marked by the city's reconstruction after wartime destruction, the expulsion of its German inhabitants, and the formation of new authorities. It began with the signing of the capitulation act of Festung Breslau at the Colonia Villa in the Krzyki district by Hermann Niehoff and Vladimir Gluzdovsky.

=== First years of settlement ===
Immediately after the war, some German residents returned to Wrocław, as they were unaware of the decisions transferring the city to Poland. In August 1945, a population census recorded 189,500 Germans and 16,500 Poles in the city. After 1945, approximately 110,000 Germans remained in Lower Silesia, particularly in Wałbrzych and Wrocław, many of whom were skilled industrial workers. The post-war city also housed a surviving Jewish minority, which gathered around the newly established Jewish Committee in June 1945, initially numbering about 400 German Jews.

Expulsions took place immediately after the war. Between June and August 1945, 400,000 people were deported from the Recovered Territories, including 28,000 from Wrocław by the end of that year. On 10 September 1945, a meeting of the German population was held at a sugar factory on Obornicka Street, where international decisions and their consequences for Germans were announced. The resettlement campaign was sometimes carried out using brutal measures. It was halted for the winter but intensified in 1946, leading to the expulsion of another 140,000 people. The entire expulsion process lasted until 1955.

The first group of 200 Poles arrived in Wrocław between 9 and 31 May 1945. They were later referred to as the Pioneers of Wrocław (a name established on 20 May 1946). This group included administrative teams, operational groups from the Economic Committee of the Council of Ministers and the Ministry of Industry, representatives of the Ministry of Education, officers of the Citizens' Militia and the Security Office, the Polish Repatriation Office, the Polish Red Cross, postal and communications staff, banking officials, and members of political parties. Railway workers maintaining Wrocław's railways and stations were also counted among the pioneers. More broadly, the term referred to individuals who, after being released from concentration and labor camps, remained in the newly annexed territories, as well as those who arrived in Wrocław between 9 May 1945 and 19 January 1947.

Many of the new residents were displaced persons from Kresy, particularly from the areas around Lviv and Stanyslaviv, as well as from the Vilnius region. A significant number also came from Greater Poland. By 1947, 22% of Wrocław's population had originated from Kresy, including 9% from Lviv, while 19% were from Greater Poland.

Based on a decree issued by the Polish Committee of National Liberation on 31 August 1944, internment camps, prisons, and forced labor centers were established for "Nazi criminals and traitors of the Polish nation". The Ministry of Public Security created Labor Camp No. 199 in Wrocław.

=== Reconstruction of Wrocław ===
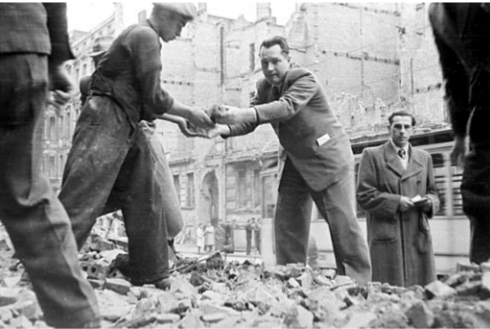
Reconstruction of Świerczewski Street – supported by President B. Kupczyński

As a result of the wartime actions, the city was over 70% destroyed. After surveying 27,000 buildings, 68% of them were deemed unrepairable, which meant the destruction of 52,460 out of 186,000 apartments. Detailed data show 90% destruction in the northern and western parts of Wrocław, about 60% in the Old Town, and from 10% to 30% in the southern and eastern districts.

One of the few undamaged landmarks that welcomed the Polish arrivals to Wrocław after the war was the Chapel of Blessed Ceslaus, a 13th-century Dominican priory. It miraculously survived the destruction during the Siege of Breslau, although the adjacent St. Wojciech Church lay in ruins.

In the early post-war years, Wrocław, like the entire area of the so-called Recovered Territories, was viewed by many newcomers as a source of supplies and looting. This was encouraged by the atmosphere of temporariness. Wrocław was ironically referred to as the "capital of the Wild West", with the crime rate four times higher than in central provinces. For many years after the war, both Wrocław residents and people from other recovered territories, as well as those displaced from these areas, held the belief that the post-war borders were temporary and would soon change. This created a sense of impermanence, hindered identification with the new place of residence, and contributed to a lack of care for the city's infrastructure and its reconstruction.

Bricks from destroyed or only slightly damaged buildings were collected by the Independent Debris Removal Unit and the Municipal Demolition Enterprise. The most well-known and articulated line of tracks was established at the end of 1947. It began at the Świebodzki Station and ended near the New Town. Bricks were transported by train to the east, beyond the pre-war Polish border, where they were intended for the reconstruction of Polish cities – Warsaw being the primary propagandistic goal. However, the shipments also went to the construction of Nowa Huta. Some demolition bricks were illegally sold on-site by corrupt officials, some of whom were later sentenced. The city was also looted by Soviet soldiers, who took artworks, factory equipment, etc. Wrocław suffered from frequent fires, some of which were deliberately set.

Nevertheless, efforts to rebuild and organize the city continued intensively. A total of 119 million PLN was spent on basic debris removal and infrastructure repairs. Plans aimed to create a city with a population of 200,000 residents, centered mainly around industry.

=== City authorities ===
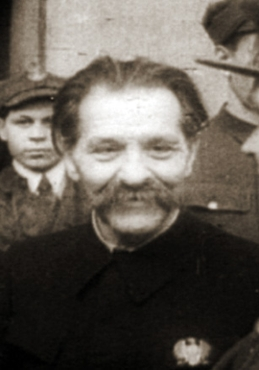
Bolesław Drobner – the first post-war president of Wrocław

The first appointed president of post-war Wrocław was Bolesław Drobner, though formal authority was held by the Soviet commander Lapunov, who served from April to June 1945. Drobner held the position from March to April 1945. During this time, he was jointly responsible for the Polish administration and sought to transform Wrocław into a separate city with its own economic system, which eliminated the circulation of money and was commonly referred to as the "Drobner Republic". His ideas were the main reason for his removal from office. In early June 1945, he protested to the local commander of the Red Army against hindering efforts to normalize life for the Polish arrivals to the city. The Soviet general beat Drobner and expelled him from his office. When Drobner appealed to Bolesław Bierut, Bierut ordered him to immediately leave Wrocław.

At the first city council meeting, composed of members of the Polish Socialist Party and Polish Workers' Party, eight departments were established: general, industry, administrative-legal, economic, health, housing, provisioning, and population movement. During his two months in office, Drobner managed to launch a heat and power plant, a gas plant, and municipal waterworks. The next president was Aleksander Wachniewski, a member of the Polish Workers' Party. The following president, Bronisław Kupczyński, served until the abolition of the office in 1950.

==== Administrative division ====
Shortly after the capitulation of Wrocław, there were three administrative divisions of the city. The Soviet administration divided the city into 12 districts of the command, which held supreme authority over the city from May to August 1945. Simultaneously, the German administrative bodies remained in place, and the city was divided into 52 quarters, each overseen by an Oberquartalleiter (quarter supervisor). Under Wachniewski's rule, Wrocław was divided into 6 districts, which formed the foundations of the future city quarters.

=== Transportation ===
Wrocław's fleet and infrastructure were destroyed by 80%. One of the first tasks was to launch public transportation in the post-war city. Of the 900 pre-war trams, only 100 remained. The first tram set off on 22 August 1945 from Spółdzielcza Street to Grunwald Square. Conditions were difficult: windows were often covered with plywood, and during winter, the interiors were heated with gas stoves.

In December of the same year, line number 2 was opened, running from Żmigrodzka Street to the Wrocław Główny railway station. The first newly constructed tram line, leading to Pafawag, was inaugurated in 1948. That same year, a circular tram line, called the "zero line", was launched, connecting all three train stations. While trams in Breslau were sand-colored before the war, they were painted blue for practical reasons after the war. It wasn't until 1952 that the trams were repainted red.

=== Congress of intellectuals ===
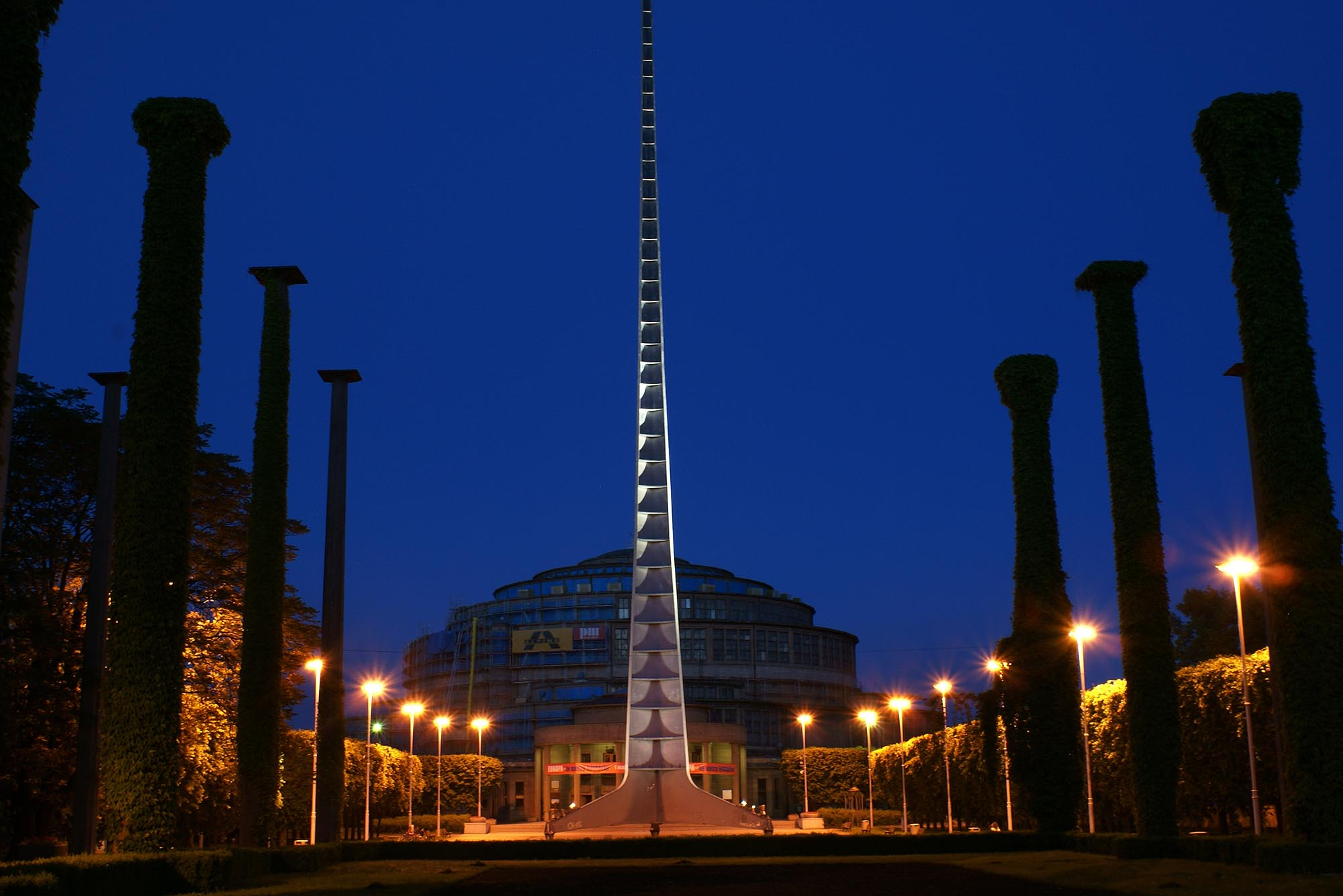
Iglica – symbol of the Recovered Territories Exhibition

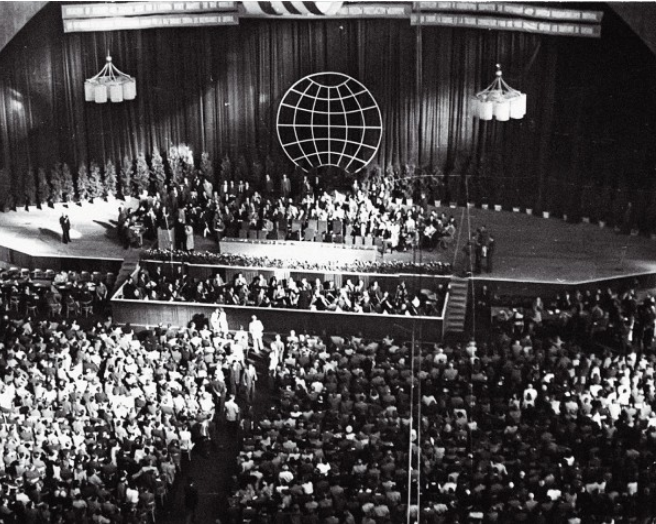
World Congress of Intellectuals in Defense of Peace

For propaganda purposes, from July to September 1948, the Recovered Territories Exhibition was held at the Centennial Hall, attracting over 1.5 million visitors. During this event, from 25 to 28 August, the World Congress of Intellectuals in Defense of Peace took place, with the participation of 400 scientists and artists from 47 countries, mainly from left-wing backgrounds. Unexpectedly, during the congress, an incident occurred due to the behavior of the Soviet delegation and a speech by Alexander Fadeyev. The congress was close to being interrupted and disgraced, with some participants dramatically leaving the sessions.

=== Situation of German-speaking population ===
After 1946, only a few Germans remained in Wrocław, mostly those necessary for the city's functioning. They were given a "red card", which protected them from deportation. After 1956, they were allowed to form associations. In 1957, the German Social-Cultural Society was established in Wałbrzych, with a branch operating in Wrocław, which became an independent association in 1991. In 1972, the organization was forced to change its name to the German Community-Cultural Society. After the imposition of martial law, German organizations were banned and dissolved. From the 1950s onward, their activity gradually declined due to the emigration of Germans to the newly established borders of the Federal Republic of Germany.

=== Timeline ===
- 1945 – 10 May: The first meeting of the City Council took place.
  - 12 May: The first provisional water supply system was launched.
  - 16 June 1945: The Warszawa Cinema opened, with the premiere film Majdanek.
  - 27 July: A decree was issued regarding street name changes. Notable renamings included Adolf Hitlerstraße to Adam Mickiewicz Street, Bismarckstraße to Bolesław Chrobry Street, and Matthiasstraße to Generalissimo Józef Stalin Street.
  - 2 August: At the Potsdam Conference, a decision was made to assign Wrocław to Poland. The city began transitioning to Polish administration.
  - 8 September: The Wrocław Opera began its activities with the performance of Halka by Stanisław Moniuszko.
  - 12 October: A curfew was imposed in the city.
  - 15 November: The University of Wrocław was reopened.
- 1946 – In January, the Wrocław Reconstruction Directorate was established to coordinate and accelerate construction efforts.
  - 4 May: The first meeting of the Municipal National Council took place.
  - 21 July: Part of the Ossolineum collections and the canvas of the Racławice Panorama were brought from Lviv to Wrocław.
- 1948 – 8 December: The Wrocław emergency medical service was launched, located at the Polish Red Cross Hospital at 2 Poniatowski Street. In June 1949, it was moved to a new location at 13 Mikołaj Rej Street.

== 1949–1980 ==
The year 1948 marked the end of the first phase of the city's reconstruction, after which a prolonged period of stagnation and marginalization followed. All signs of regionalism were eliminated, including the Ministry of Recovered Territories. Almost all institutions promoting Western thought were disbanded, such as the Polish Western Union, which was incorporated into the Maritime League; and the Institutes of Silesia, the Baltic, and Mazuria were closed. Most decisions were made by the Central Committee of the Polish United Workers' Party, followed by the provincial party committee. The process of centralization and marginalization was not as intense among the city's residents; efforts were made to recreate the realities of pre-war Lviv and Kresy, from which a significant portion of the settlers came. Development occurred after the 1956 thaw, when the city once again became a major regional center. The period from 1950 to 1970 was characterized by rapid population growth: in 1950, the city had 309,000 inhabitants, in 1960 it reached 432,000, and in 1970 it had 526,000 residents.

=== City authorities ===
Until 1984, the position of the city president was combined with the role of the voivode. In the 1970s, two mayors were dismissed: Marian Czuliński for the demolition of the St. Clara Mills and Zbigniew Nadratowski, who was blamed for the disastrous consequences of shutting down the heat and power plant in early 1979. The official reason for his dismissal was corruption related to the purchase of a villa. Nadratowski was replaced by Janusz Owczarek, who had previously served as the voivode of Legnica. Due to the reorganization of the Wrocław presidency, Owczarek lost his position in 1984, although he remained the voivode until 1990.

=== Division into districts ===
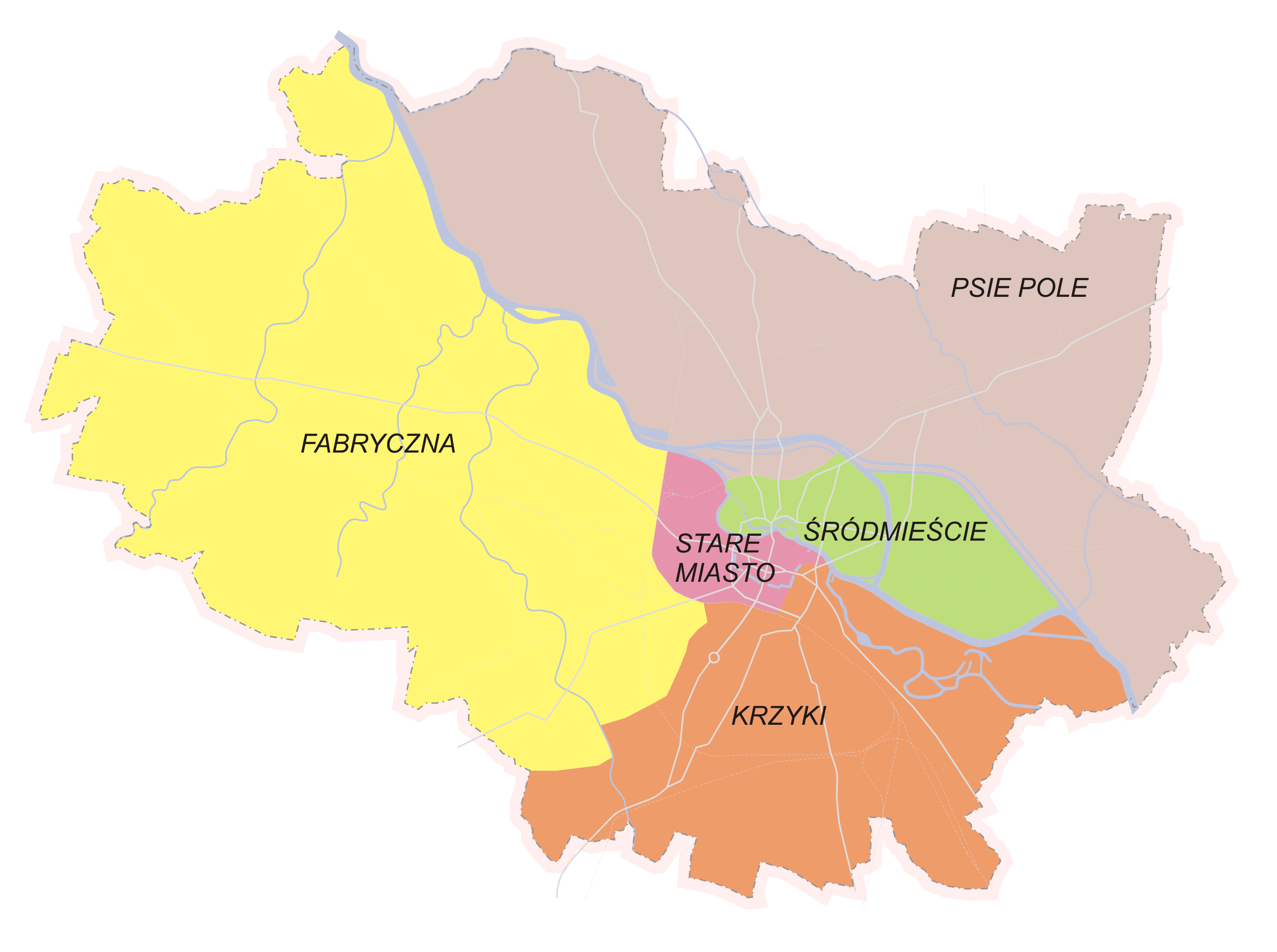
Division of the city into five districts

From 1952 to 1991, the city was administered based on districts. In February 1952, five new districts were created, replacing the previously existing regional commissariats: Krzyki, Psie Pole, Fabryczna, Old Town, and Downtown. On 31 December 1956, by decree of the State Council, the city was separated from the voivodeship, and the municipal national council was granted voivodeship-level powers. This decision provided significant autonomy to the districts in various aspects, such as urban planning and education. Residents elected district national councils, which in turn selected the executive body – the Presidium of the District Council. District authorities functioned as the first administrative instance, while city authorities acted as the second.

In 1957, there were proposals to establish three additional districts for the neighborhoods of Brochów, Leśnica, and Psie Pole. However, the Wrocław National Council only made boundary adjustments to the existing districts, which occurred when incorporating new areas. This system remained in place until 5 October 1991, when it was changed by a resolution of the city council.

=== Territorial expansion ===
In 1951, Wrocław annexed several new localities, including Bieńkowice, Brochów, Jagodno, Klecina, Lamowice Stare, Miłostów, Muchobór Wielki, Oporów, Ołtaszyn, Wojnów, Wojszyce, Zakrzów, and Zgorzelisko. Further expansions took place in 1970 and 1973, incorporating northern and western areas such as Strachowice, Osiniec, Jerzmanowo, Jarnołtowo, Żar, Mokra, Marszowice, Rędzin, Świniary, Widawa, Polanowice, Pracze Widawskie, Lipa Piotrowska, Kłokoczyce, and Pawłowice. By 1973, the city's total area had reached 292.8 km².

=== Economy ===
==== Industry ====
The communist authorities prioritized heavy industry, even in large cities. Wrocław accounted for 3% of the national industrial output, with approximately 100,000 people employed in around 700 factories. Industrial plants were generally located in the southwest and western parts of the city, as they had been before the war.

Wrocław became a hub for the machinery industry. PZL Hydral, which produced hydraulic components and systems for aircraft, employed several thousand workers. The Archimedes factory manufactured pneumatic and hydraulic machinery and tools. The state-owned Pafawag railway car factory was, in the 1970s and 1980s, the largest rolling stock producer in Poland and one of the largest in Europe. In 1962, Pafawag began producing EN57 electric multiple units, commonly known as "kible" – 1,429 units were built within the first two years. The Hutmen plant specialized in manufacturing copper tubes and rods. On Grabiszyńska Street, the former locksmith factory was replaced by the FUM lathe factory, which, from 1975, became known as the Automatic Lathe Factory. In 1959, the Elwro plant began operations, initially producing television components before later shifting to computers.

==== Construction ====
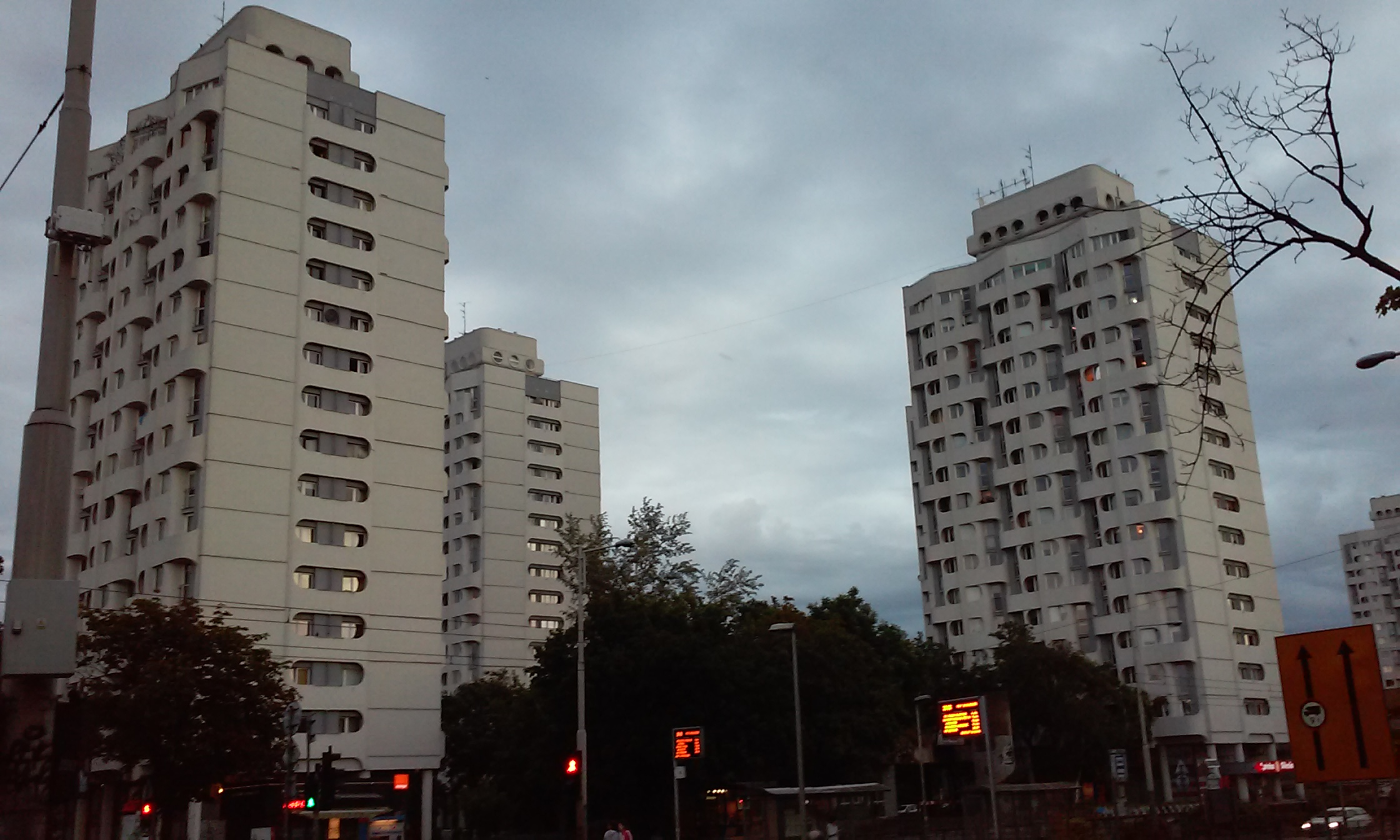
Buildings at Grunwald Square

During the 1950s, under the pretext of completing the initial reconstruction of the city, large-scale brick looting took place, especially from New Market Square. The Wrocław Reconstruction Directorate was dissolved and replaced by the Municipal Demolition Enterprise.

The most significant construction project of the 1960s was the so-called Kościuszko Residential District near Świdnicka Street and Kościuszko Square, designed to house around 4,000 people, primarily udarniks. The architectural style of the 1960s became bolder; early in the decade, the Mezonetowiec on Kołłątaj Street was built – the first building in Poland featuring duplex apartments. Around the same time, New Market Square underwent a complete redevelopment.

At the turn of the 1960s and 1970s, the Trzonolinowiec, a high-rise with floors suspended on steel cables, was constructed – earning the nickname "wisielec" ("the hanged man"). In the late 1960s, an avant-garde complex of six high-rise towers was built at Grunwald Square, commonly referred to as "sedesowce" ("toilet bowls") or "bunkrowce" ("bunkers") due to their distinctive design.

Large housing estates were also constructed. In the 1960s and 1970s, efforts focused on rebuilding the heavily damaged areas of Krzyki, covering more than 100 hectares. Four residential estates – Anna, Barbara, Celina, and Dorota – were developed there. In 1969, the city's largest and longest building, the Mrówkowiec on Drukarska Street, was completed in this area.

By the late 1970s, Wrocław's skyline saw the addition of Poltegor Centre, the city's tallest building at the time, and the Wrocław Hotel, built by a Finnish company – both located on Powstańców Śląskich Street. The 1970s and 1980s also saw the development of housing estates, including Kozanów, constructed on a floodplain using the large panel system, and Nowy Dwór.

==== Transport and communication ====
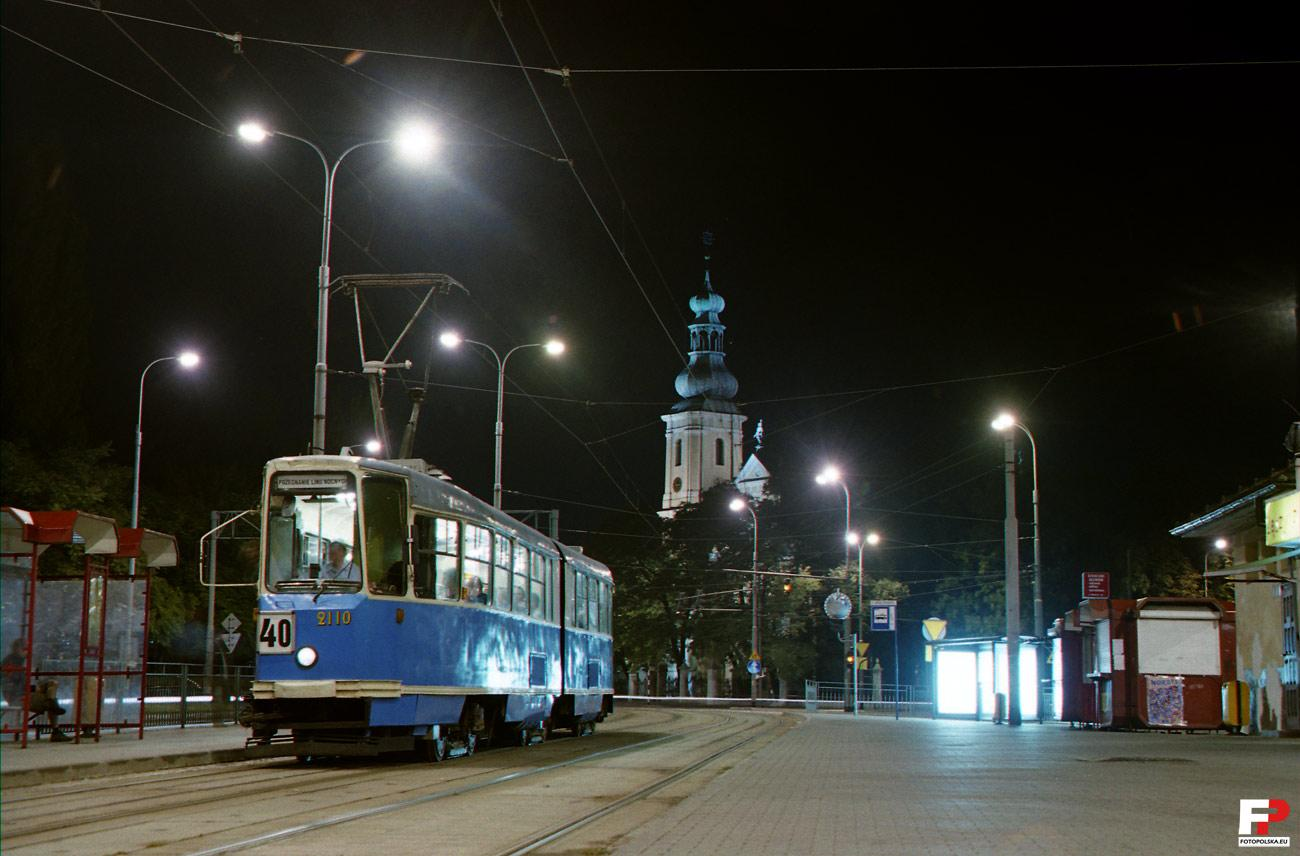
Type 102N tram – the first modern tram in Wrocław

In 1956, standardized N-type tram cars were introduced to Wrocław. During the 1960s, automatic doors began to be incorporated into trams. In 1969, articulated 102N trams were introduced. In the 1960s, Wrocław's trams were painted red, while those financed by local factories were painted blue. In 1973, all remaining trams were repainted to this color. Also, during the 1970s, the role of conductors on trams was eliminated. From 1963 to 1969, bus services were rapidly expanded, though the development of rail transport was somewhat neglected. The first Jelcz buses were also tested in Wrocław. By the late 1970s, 280 Ikarus buses were imported to the city.

In the early 1970s, with the construction of the W-Z route, which connected the eastern and western parts of the city, the transportation network in the city center was restructured. On 22 July 1974, the W-Z route was opened, and in 1978, the redesigned Dominikański Square (then Dzierżyński Square) was inaugurated. This led to the withdrawal of tram traffic from the market, as well as from Dąbrowski and Krasiński streets, rerouting them through the W-Z route.

=== Culture ===
At the turn of the 1960s and 1970s, Wrocław became one of the most important cultural centers in the country. On 9 August 1966, the first edition of the Wratislavia Cantans festival was held. The city was also home to Henryk Tomaszewski's Mime Theatre and the experimental Laboratorium Theatre of Jerzy Grotowski. In 1977, the first Przegląd Piosenki Aktorskiej festival took place, which has since been held annually at the Wrocław Polish Theatre. At the People's Hall, the Gigant Cinema opened, the largest in Poland, with a capacity of 2,000 viewers and a screen measuring 22 by 18 meters. In the record year of 1965, 31 cinemas operated in the city.

=== Smallpox epidemic ===
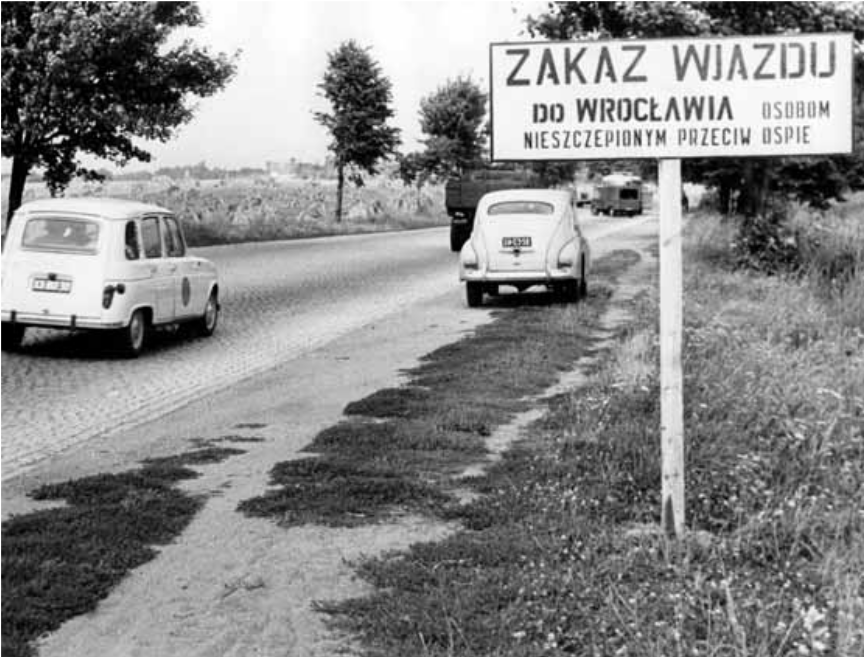
Restriction of entry to Wrocław during the epidemic

In 1963, a smallpox epidemic broke out in Wrocław, brought from India by an agent of the Polish People's Republic secret services, Colonel Bonifacy Jedynak. The epidemic was diagnosed on 15 July, a month and a half after the disease was brought into the city. The authorities imposed strict restrictions on movement, and the population was placed under quarantine. During the epidemic, which lasted from July to October, 7 people died and 99 fell ill. The city was closed off, and residents were subjected to a mandatory vaccination program, with 98% of the population being vaccinated. Despite extensive efforts, the epidemic spread beyond the city. Isolation centers were set up in Pracze Odrzańskie and Psie Pole; around 1,000 people were isolated (out of 2,500 available spaces).

=== Timeline ===
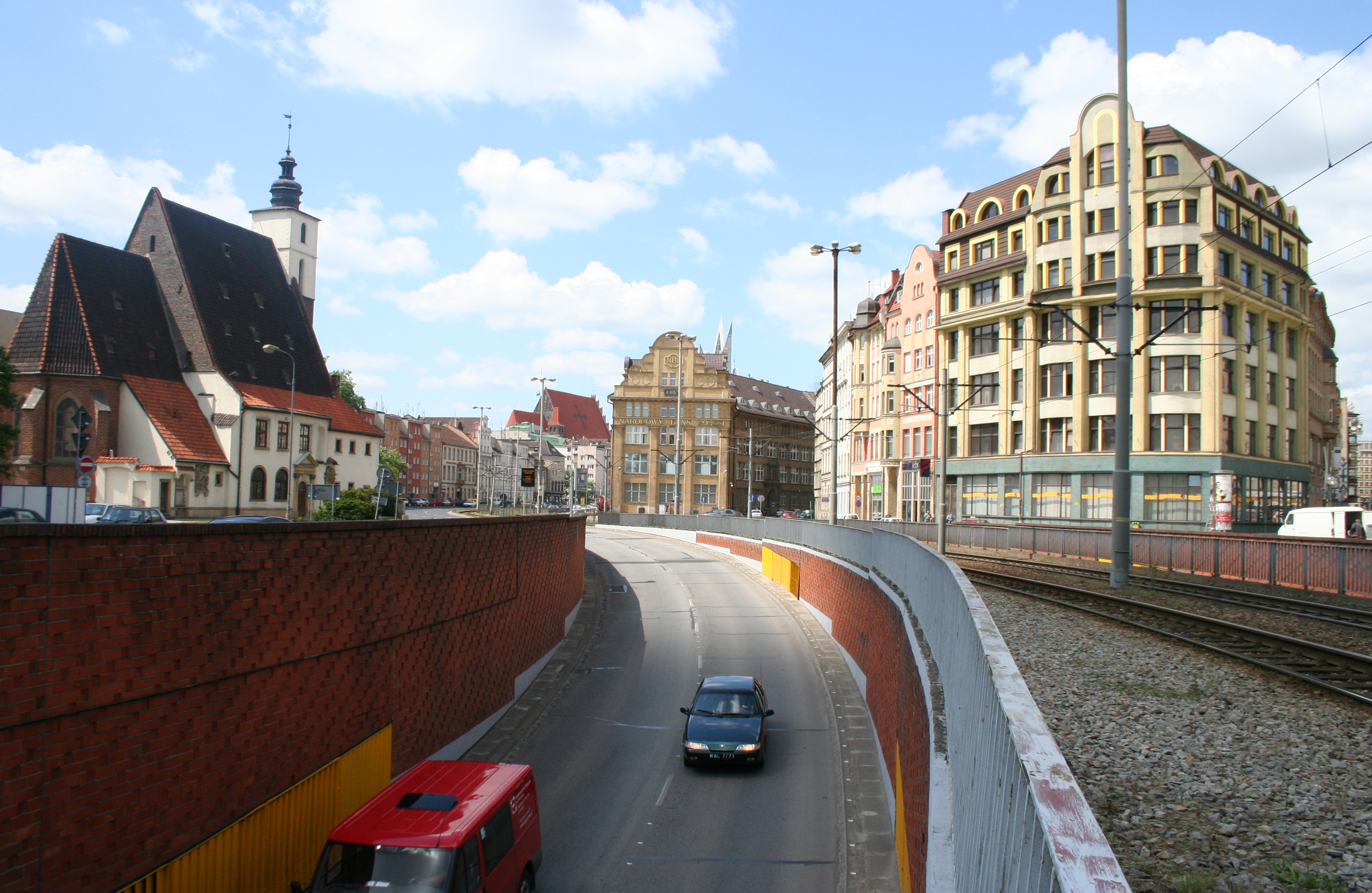
W-Z route at the height of Dominikański Square

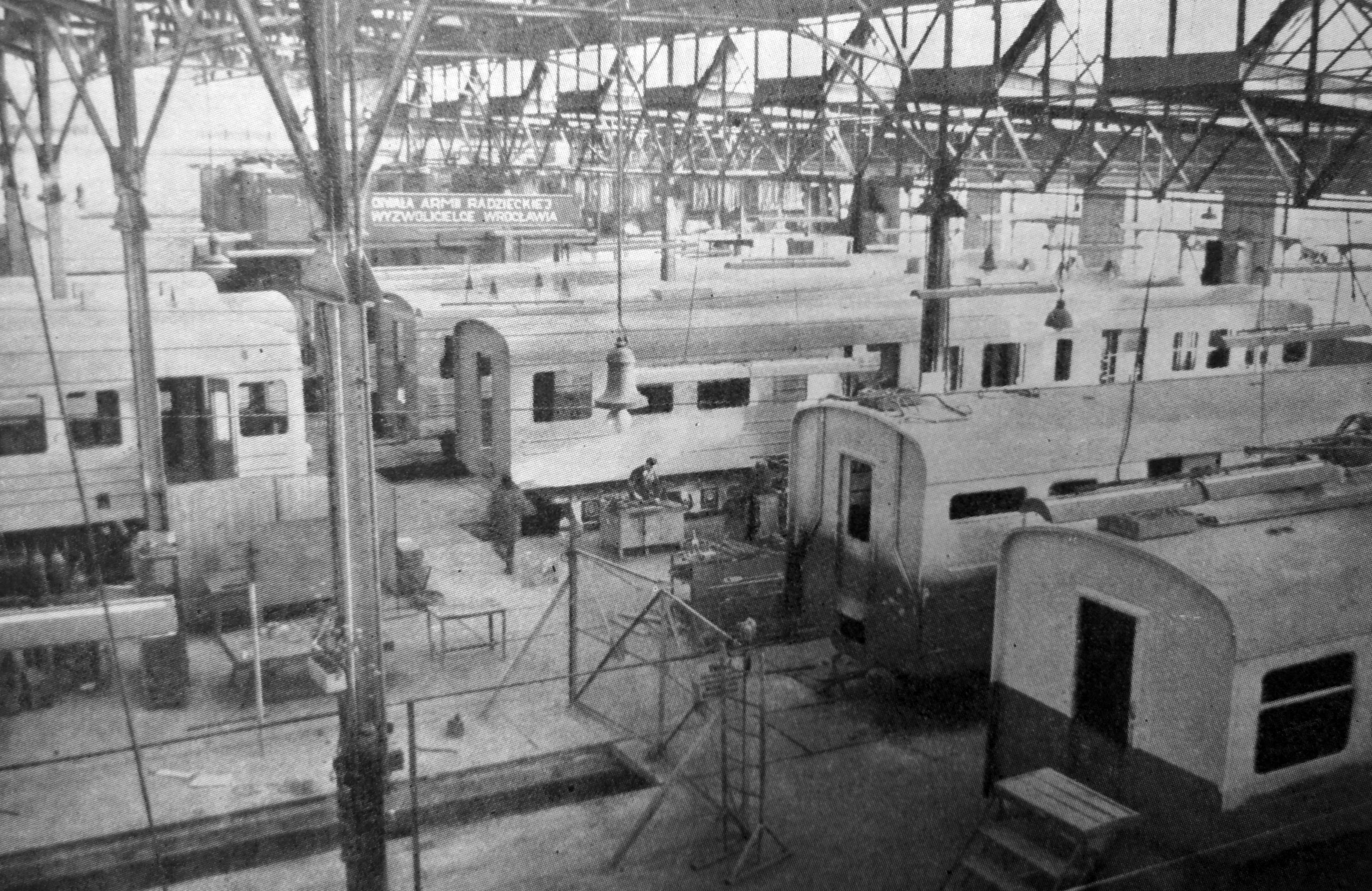
Assembly of EN57 trains at the Pafawag factory in Wrocław

==== 1950s–1960s ====
- 1949 – 2 April: The Jewish Theatre was opened in Wrocław.
- 1951 – 29 July: The Wrocław Cathedral, rebuilt after war damages, was consecrated.
- 1956 – Demonstrations and rallies took place in the city calling for democratization of life in the country.
  - 15 July: A monument of Aleksander Fredro, brought from Lviv, was erected in Wrocław's market square.
  - July: The Committee for the Reconstruction of the Racławice Panorama started operating.
  - September: The Society of Lovers of Wrocław began its activities.
- 1961 – Wrocław Flower Festival was inaugurated on 22 July.
- 1963 – Wrocław hosted the European Men's Basketball Championship.
- 1966 – The Wratislavia Cantans festival was inaugurated.
- 1967 – In May, the city's only narrow-gauge railway line, the connection to Trzebnica, was closed.

==== 1970s ====
- 1974 – Emergency medical services in the city were reorganized. The Lower Silesian Emergency Medical Service was created after merging the Municipal and Provincial Ambulance Stations, headquartered at 112 Traugutt Street.
  - September: The Belgian Polonia High School opened at Szczytnicka Street. It quickly became one of the best secondary schools in Poland. In 2002, it moved to the building of the former Inland Navigation Technical School on Brückner Street.
- 1975 – 28 May: Due to administrative reform, Wrocław and Poznań lost their status as separate cities.
  - The medieval St. Clara Mills, located between Słodowa Island and Bielarska Island, were blown up following a decision by Marian Czuliński. He was dismissed from his post due to this decision.
- 1977 – Śląsk Wrocław won the Polish championships in football, basketball, and handball.
  - The modern Dolmed medical diagnostic center was opened.
- 1979 – A particularly harsh winter paralyzed the city for several days, with temperatures dropping below 20°C. The position of the voivode was lost by Zbigniew Nadratowski, who was blamed for the shutdown of the Wrocław combined heat and power plant, which caused a power outage in Wrocław hospitals, including maternity wards.
- 1980 – 26 August: Wrocław's factories joined the strikes. The Wrocław branch of Solidarity was founded at the bus depot at Grabiszyńska Street.

== 1981–1989 ==
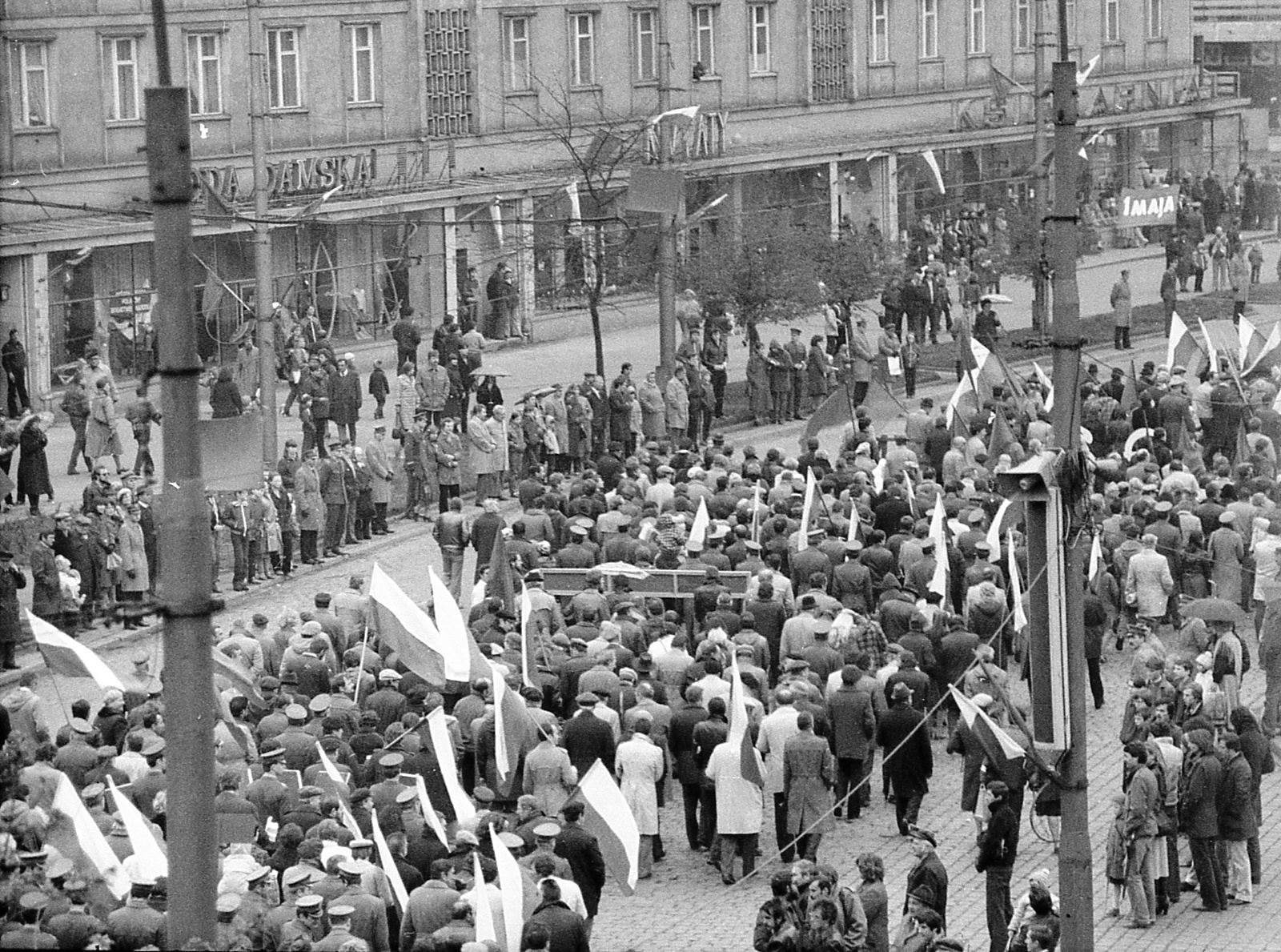
May Day celebrations in 1982

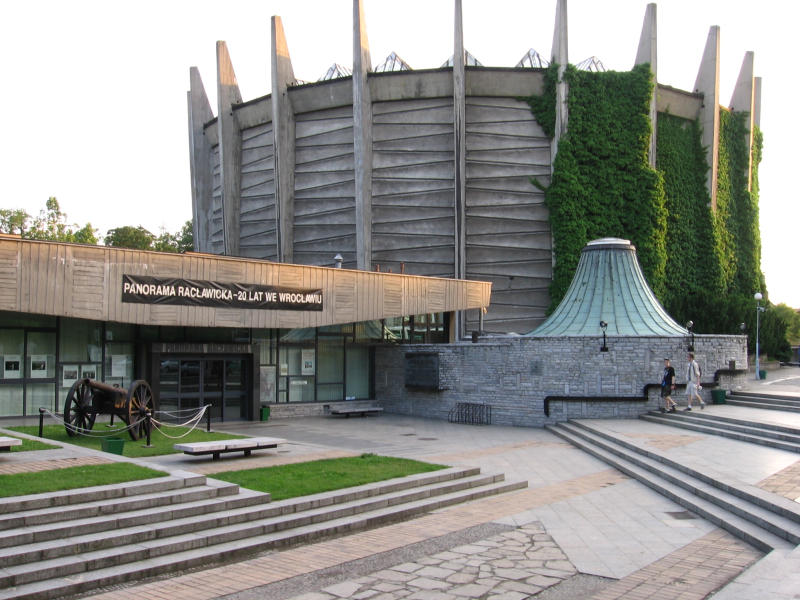
Rotunda of the Racławice Panorama

The 1980s was a period of stagnation amid a general atmosphere of economic recession. During martial law, Wrocław was a significant center of social resistance. A major event in the city was the papal visit in 1983. In 1984, the position of the president of the city was reinstated, and Stanisław Apoznański became the first to hold it. The last president during the socialist era was Stefan Skąpski. Wrocław established its position in the information technology market; in the 1980s, the Bolek and Lolek calculators and the Elwro 800 Junior computer were created. In 1987, the Orange Alternative movement started, using happenings to highlight the absurdities of life under the communist regime and mock the actions of the militia. During one such demonstration, on 6 December 1987, 30 Santa Clauses took to the streets, only to be arrested by the militia.

=== Martial law ===
On 13 December, martial law was declared throughout Poland. Strikes in factories and universities were suppressed by the army and militia. At the Wrocław University of Science and Technology, 600 people were on strike; the strike was broken up on the night of 15/16 December. During the crackdown, engineer Stanisław Kostecki died of a heart attack. After his funeral (18 December), the first street demonstration in Wrocław took place following the declaration of martial law. The protests in Wrocław were large and intense; the 31 August 1982 protest, with 50,000 participants, was the largest and most turbulent in the country since martial law was declared: Motorized Reserves of the Citizens' Militia units were attacked, forcing them to retreat multiple times. The militia and army units that participated in suppressing the riots used live ammunition. At least eight protesters were shot, one of whom, Kazimierz Michalczyk, died two days later from his injuries.

=== Papal visit in 1983 ===
On 21 June 1983, Pope John Paul II visited Wrocław during his second pilgrimage to Poland. The main events took place at the Horse Racing Track in Partynice (it was initially planned to take place at the so-called Mars Fields near the Olympic Stadium). It was the first papal visit to the city. A total of 1,300,000 tickets were issued for the mass.

=== Timeline ===
- 1982 – On 9 May, WKS Śląsk Wrocław lost 0:1 at home to Wisła Kraków in front of about 30,000 spectators. The match was to decide the Polish championship. The course of the match was considered the most suspicious in Polish football history. The championship was won by Widzew Łódź.
- 1983 – A new athletics stadium was opened at Skarbowców Street, the first in the country with a tartan surface, built with the idea of hosting the World Athletics Championships.
- 1984 – In June, the position of the president of the city of Wrocław was reinstated, with Stanisław Apoznański taking office.
- 1985 – In June, the Gomułka Hill was opened to the public. It was a former dump of rubble from the period of the city's siege, located between Borowska, Ślężna, Dyrekcyjna, and Kamienna streets. After 1990, it was renamed to General Anders Hill.
  - A copy of the pillory, destroyed in February 1945, was unveiled in the Market Square.
  - The Racławice Panorama, which had been brought to the city in 1946 and later moved outside Wrocław, was made available for public viewing. The building (the rotunda) was constructed in the 1960s and 1970s.
  - 16–18 August 1985 – An international congress of Jehovah's Witnesses, titled "The People Who Keep Integrity", was held at the Olympic Stadium.
- 1987 – A partnership agreement was signed with Wiesbaden, covering cultural, sports, and educational cooperation, including student exchanges.

== Third Polish Republic ==
The 1990s in Wrocław were a period of intensive urban development. The new order after 1989 granted municipal authorities much greater influence over city policies and operations. While heavy industry collapsed after 1989, the service sector expanded, mitigating the effects of economic transformation. Wrocław became a major IT hub – in the first half of 2015, over 40 medium and large IT companies operated in the city. The city government focused on international promotion; though unsuccessful in securing the world's fair (despite two attempts), Wrocław hosted three major events in the early 21st century: the UEFA Euro 2012, the European Capital of Culture, and the 2017 World Games for non-Olympic sports.

Many buildings were renovated, including the Olympic Stadium and the main railway station. New structures emerged, such as Sky Tower – the tallest in the city and one of the tallest in Poland – the Wroclavia shopping center featuring Poland's first underground long-distance bus station, and the Africarium at Wrocław Zoo. The Szczepin district and the area around Legnicka Street saw the construction of numerous office buildings, creating a "business district". In 1997, the city was hit by a flood that submerged about 40% of its area. Wrocław also developed its transportation network, including the Wrocław Motorway Bypass and a new tram line to Kozanów.

During the 2000s, the population slightly declined: in 2011, Wrocław had 631,235 residents – about 9,000 fewer than in 2001. Between 2015 and 2017, the city became a destination for Ukrainian migrants; in 2017, between 51,000 and 64,000 Ukrainians lived in Wrocław.

=== City authorities ===
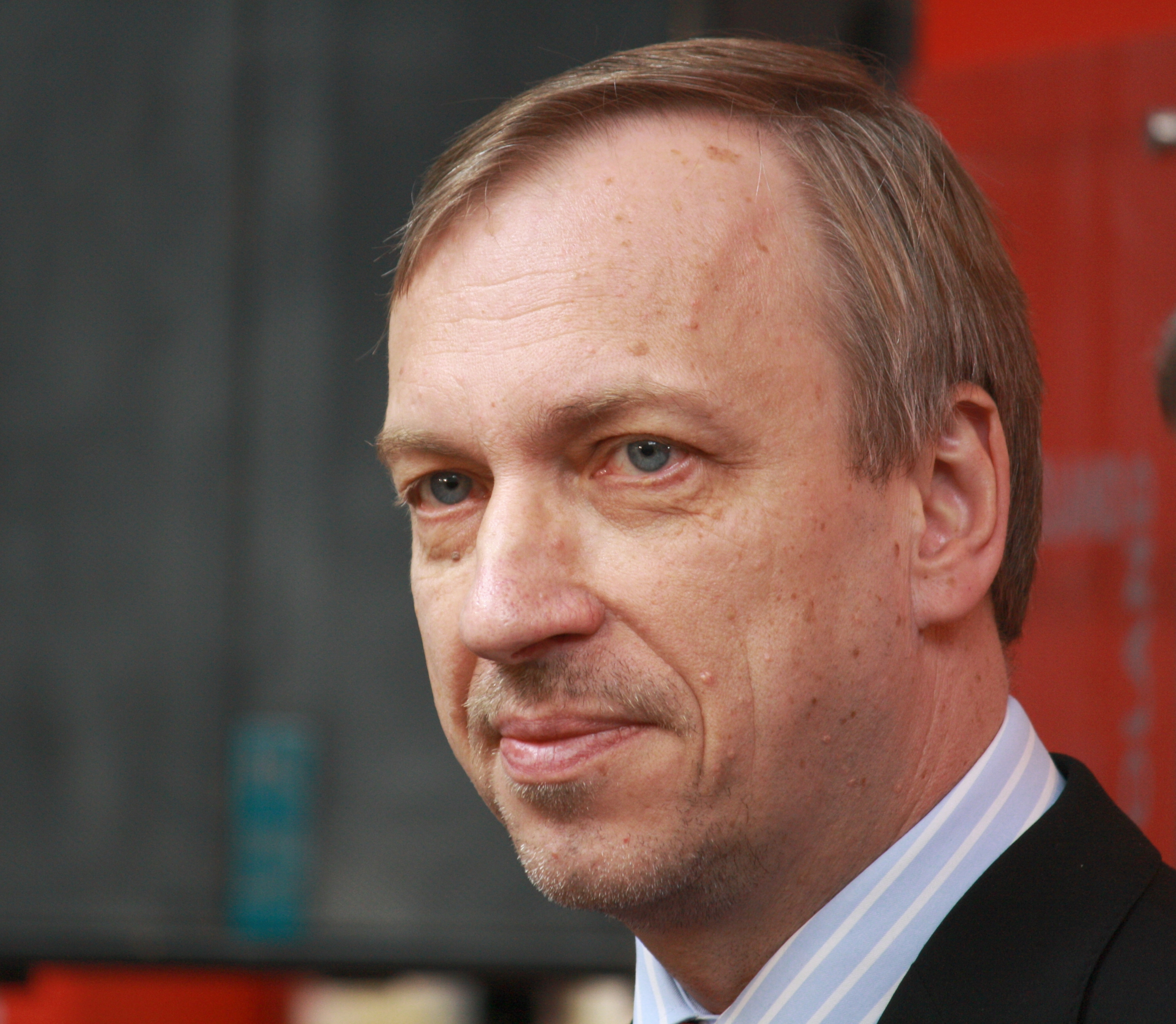
Bogdan Zdrojewski – the first non-communist president of Polish Wrocław

In the 1990 local self-government elections, the Solidarity Citizens' Committee emerged victorious. The Wrocław City Council elected Bogdan Zdrojewski as the city's president. That same year, Wrocław reinstated its historic five-field coat of arms. The first chairman of the city council was Stanisław Miękisz.

In 2002, Wrocław held its first direct presidential elections. In the second round, Rafał Dutkiewicz (supported by the Civic Platform and Law and Justice) defeated the Democratic Left Alliance candidate Lidia Geringer de Oedenberg. In 2006, Dutkiewicz won in the first round with 84% of the vote. In the 2014 elections, he defeated the Law and Justice candidate, Mirosława Stachowiak-Różecka, in the second round.

=== Administrative division reform ===
In 1991, the existing division of Wrocław into five districts was abolished, along with their district offices. The city was instead divided into neighborhoods, each governed by a neighborhood council. The district division is still maintained in some branches of central administration, such as the judiciary. In 2015, the then-president proposed reinstating the district system, but the proposal was not approved. Public interest in neighborhood council elections has remained low; in 2013, only 14,000 Wrocław residents participated in these elections.

=== Economy ===
==== Industry ====
After 1989, the development of heavy industry collapsed, as it could not compete with Western companies. Some enterprises went bankrupt, like Elwro, while others had to find new partners, were acquired by creditors, or became part of Western corporations. For example, Pafawag became part of the Canadian company Bombardier Transportation and specialized in building locomotive boxes. Some enterprises were saved at the cost of reducing employment, such as Hutmen, which had to lay off 1,000 workers. In contrast, the service sector grew, and as a result, the effects of transformation were not too harsh for the city. Since 2000, the local authorities have focused on a knowledge-based economy, supporting cooperation between universities and businesses. This led to the creation of the Wrocław Technology Park.

Wrocław has become a major IT hub. In the first half of 2015, over 40 medium and large companies providing IT services operated in the city, including companies like Google and Nokia Networks – one of Nokia's three largest centers in the world.

In the 2010s, Wrocław stood out among Polish cities with its low unemployment rate. At the beginning of 2017, the unemployment rate in the city was below 3%, compared to the national rate of 7.3%.

==== Construction ====
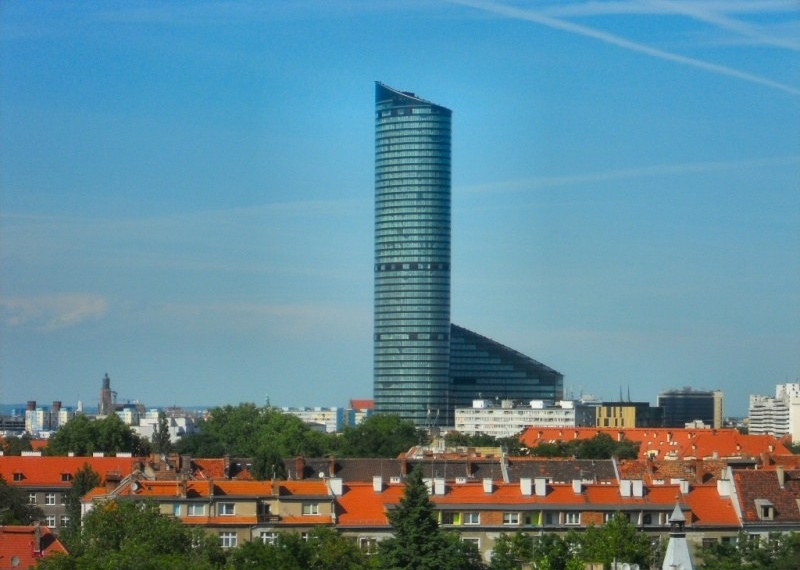
Sky Tower

After 1989, Wrocław experienced a construction boom. In the city center, new buildings (so-called infill buildings) were erected on the sites of old tenement houses and their remains. Wrocław built more of these than other cities. The cityscape of the center changed, with notable buildings such as Arkady Capitol, Silver Tower Center, Wroclavia, the National Forum of Music, as well as student dormitories Ołówek and Kredka, and the controversial Solpol building on Świdnicka Street. In May 2012, the tallest skyscraper in Wrocław, Sky Tower, was opened at Powstańców Śląskich Street, built on the site of the former Poltegor Centre. Wrocław's contemporary architecture does not follow a single style; there are buildings with a modern appearance, as well as those referencing history and tradition.

==== Transport and communication ====
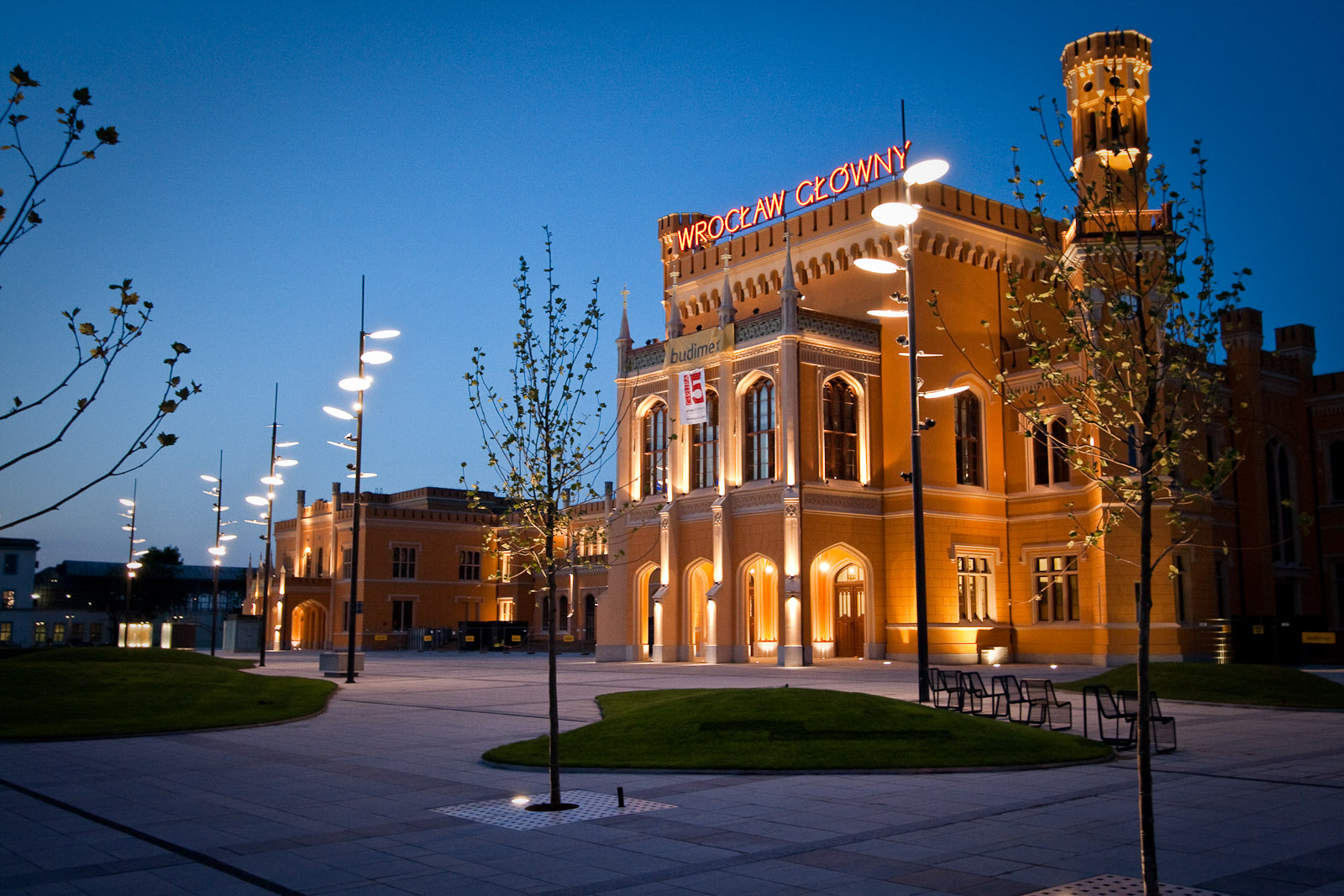
Renovated Wrocław Główny railway station

In 1990, the last stretch of railway track (until 2017) was rebuilt on Wyszyński Street, from Szczytnicka to Sienkiewicz streets. In 2011, a tram line to Gaj was opened, equipped with an intelligent transport system. The line is serviced by new Škoda trams and was called Tramwaj Plus. In March 2012, ahead of the European Championship, a tram line to Kozanów was opened. Due to traffic congestion and inefficient public transport, the city decided to make use of its dense railway network. On 10 April 2017, the first urban railway line to Wrocław Wojnów railway station was launched, operated by Lower Silesian Railways.

==== Negative changes caused by the city's development ====
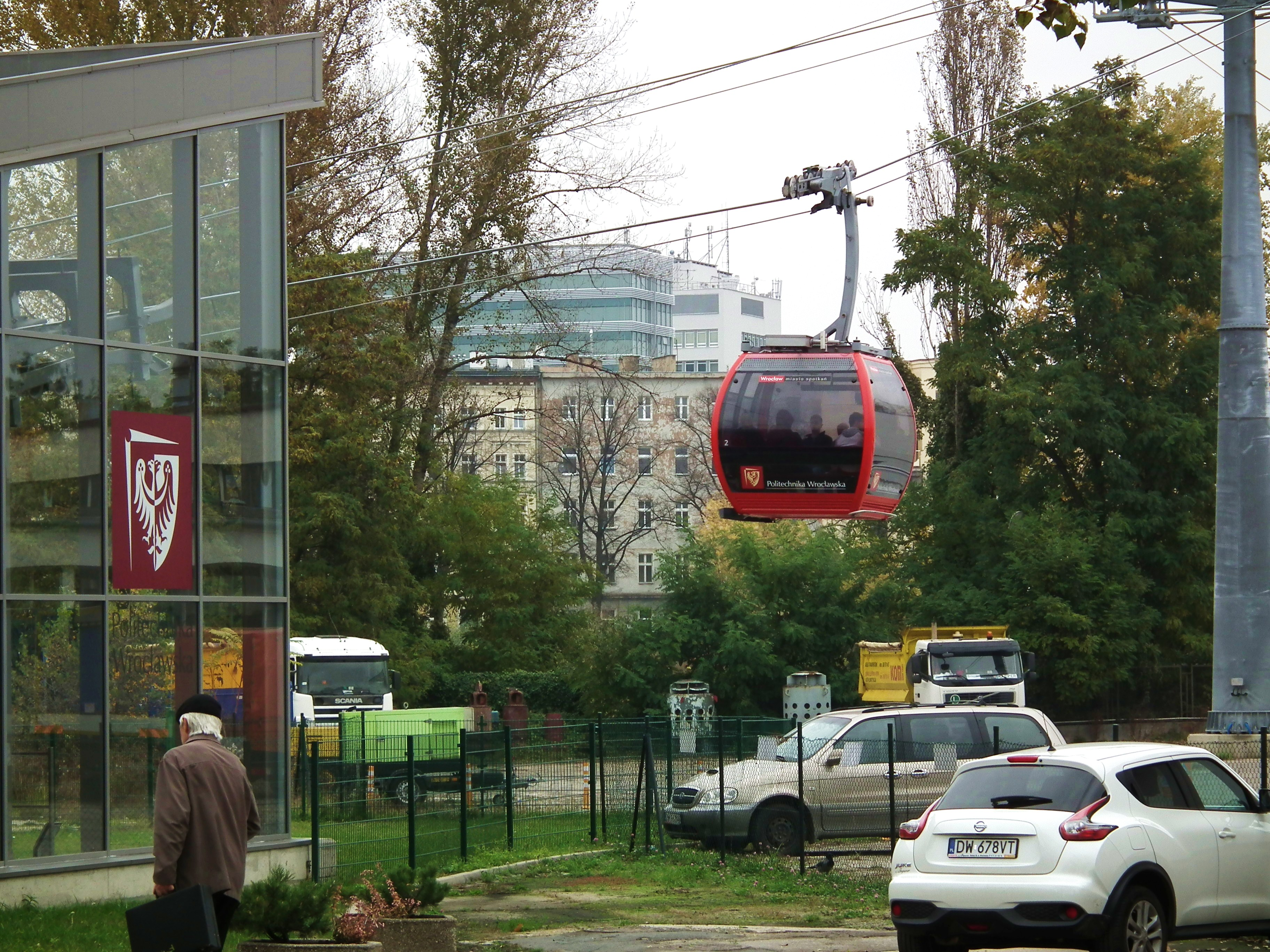
Polinka cable car near Grunwald Square

Political and economic changes after 1989 led to the emergence of new problems, which were present on a smaller scale before. Since the 1990s, suburbanization has been observed in Wrocław, with residents moving to towns near the city, while the overall population of the metropolitan area has remained steady. In the 2010s, the city center began to depopulate, mainly due to the lack of green spaces, high crime rates, and pollution. The influx of people from the suburbs to Wrocław for work and study causes traffic jams on major roads. The opening of the Wrocław Motorway Bypass improved the situation, but did not eliminate it. On Zwycięska Street, which is an outbound road to the south of the country, the speed in rush hours in 2017 was 2.2 km/h. The average Wrocław resident spent 9 hours per month in traffic jams in 2017. Traffic jams negatively affect the efficiency of public transport, and residents often complain about the punctuality of trams and buses. Wrocław's transport system, alongside that of Poznań, received some of the most negative ratings from residents of Polish cities. In the 21st century, the issue of smog caused by coal burning worsened, especially during winter. On some days, particulate matter levels exceeded acceptable limits multiple times.

=== Culture ===
In 2016, Wrocław was designated the European Capital of Culture. This event brought numerous cultural activities, ranging from large-scale events such as the Opening Weekend to smaller, locally significant ones. Notable performances included Ennio Morricone, David Gilmour, and the band Rammstein. As part of the celebrations, investments were made in various cultural venues, such as the Four Domes Pavilion, Capitol Musical Theatre, National Forum of Music, Fama Cultural and Library Centre, Wrocław Club Formaty, the Museum of Pan Tadeusz, and the Zajezdnia History Centre. Additionally, the "Train to Culture" was introduced, offering weekend train connections between Wrocław and Berlin, which proved popular and was maintained after the event.

Since 2003, Wrocław has hosted the Thanks Jimi Festival, an attempt to break the Guinness World Record for the largest number of guitarists playing together. The festival has achieved several records:

- 2003: 588 participants (record not broken)
- 2004: 916 participants (record not broken)
- 2005: 1,201 participants (record not broken)
- 2006: 1,581 participants (new Guinness World Record)
- 2007: 1,881 participants (new Guinness World Record)
- 2008: 1,951 participants (new Guinness World Record)
- 2009: 6,346 participants (new Guinness World Record)
- 2010: 4,597 participants (record not broken)
- 2011: 5,601 participants (record not broken)
- 2012: 7,273 participants (new Guinness World Record)
- 2013: 5,734 participants (record not broken)

==== Wrocław Dwarfs ====
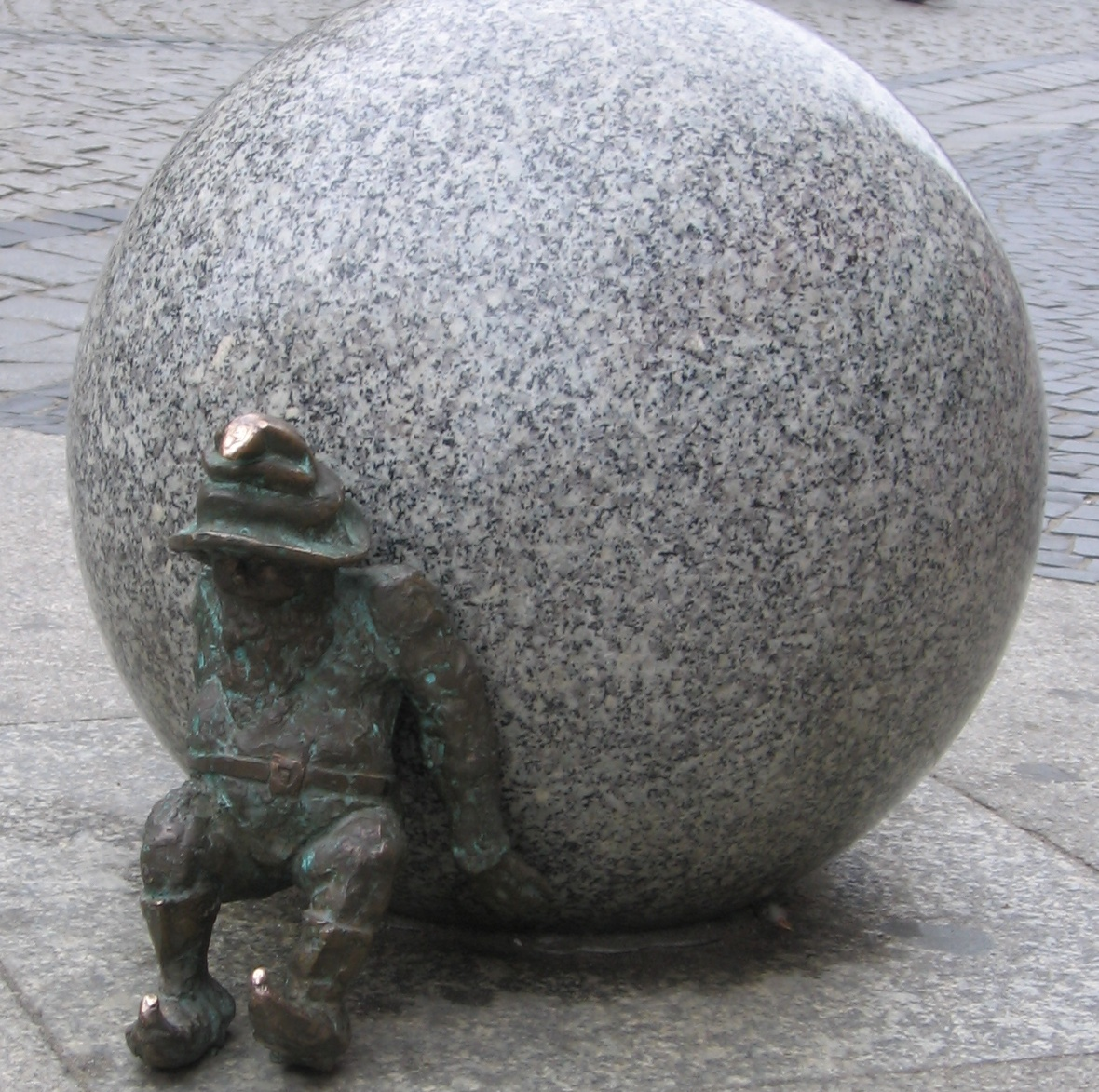
Dwarf Syzyfek

The tradition of the dwarfs in Wrocław began with the Orange Alternative movement and continued into the early 21st century, resulting in the creation of the famous Wrocław Dwarfs. In the first decade of the 2000s, this phenomenon grew, with notable contributions from Wrocław's president, Rafał Dutkiewicz, who unveiled a miniature plaque on a building wall marked Muzeum Krasnoludków (The Dwarf Museum) between the Market Square and the St. Elizabeth's Church. In August 2005, miniature bronze dwarf sculptures designed by Tomasz Moczek, a graduate of the Eugeniusz Geppert Academy of Fine Arts, appeared at various locations across the city. Some of the first sculptures included: the "swordsman" near the university, the "butcher" on the Old Butcher's Stall, two "Sisyphuses" on Świdnicka Street, and the "Oder washer" near the Piaskowy Bridge. In the following years, dozens more such sculptures were added across Wrocław. Some of these included the "actor" by the Puppet Theatre fountain, the "parasole" holder, and the "duck-feeder". By the end of 2007, there were around 50 dwarfs in the city, and by 2014, their number had grown to over 300.

=== 1997 flood ===
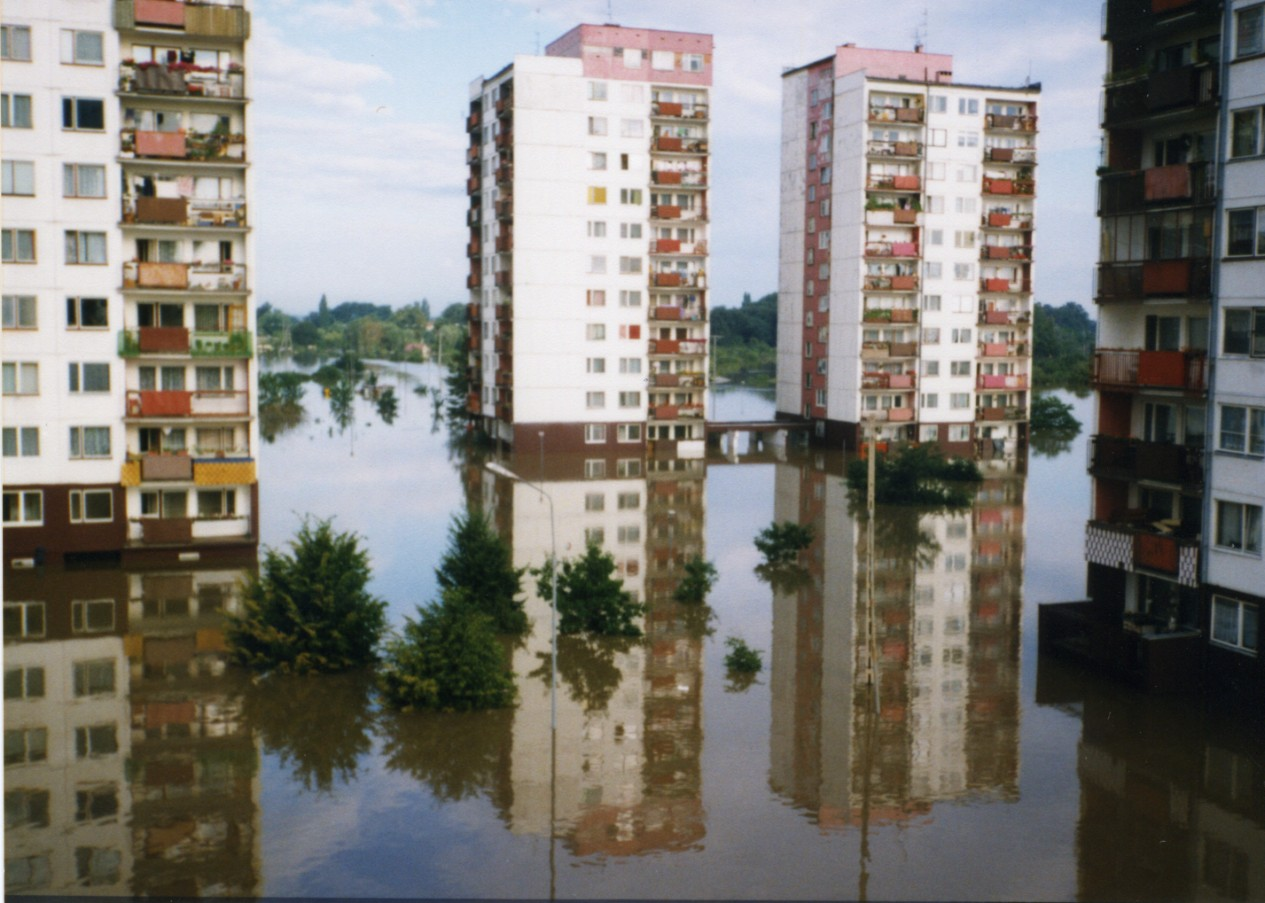
Flooded Kozanów neighborhood

In July 1997, Wrocław experienced the largest flood in its history, often referred to as the "flood of the millennium". Many residential and industrial districts were flooded, causing significant damage to buildings, as well as extensive harm to hydrotechnical structures. Some neighborhoods were completely submerged, such as Zalesie and Zacisze, located between the flood channel and the old riverbed of the Oder. These areas had no chance of being saved from the flooding. Similar risks threatened the Sępolno and Biskupin districts, but thanks to the heroic efforts of the city's residents, who placed sandbags, the water was kept at bay.

Quickly reinforced flood embankments with sandbags held strong in critical spots, saving neighborhoods such as Karłowice, Różanka, and Osobowice, which were particularly vulnerable. However, several areas did not escape the flood. Among the flooded zones were Kowale, Maślice, Strachocin, Księże Wielkie, Księże Małe, Rakowiec, Widawa, and Pracze Odrzańskie, all located on land that had historically served as floodplains before and after World War II. The large housing complex of Kozanów, housing around 25,000 residents in prefab buildings, was submerged, with water levels reaching up to 4 meters (to the first floor).

Most neighborhoods along the Oder river, such as Kleczków, Ołbin, and Nadodrze, were also affected, with water entering areas inhabited by about 60,000 people. About 40% of the city's area was flooded. The city was left without running water for an extended period and faced partial power outages and communication disruptions. Thanks to the heroic actions of the residents, the city's most valuable landmarks, such as the Town Hall and the Cathedral Island with the Wrocław Cathedral, were saved. Many precious items and documents were also rescued. However, many historical archives, including valuable written materials, were damaged in the flooded libraries and municipal and court archives. Some hospitals, telecommunications, energy, and sanitation infrastructures were also affected, as well as numerous businesses and residents' properties. Despite these damages, public transportation vehicles – buses and trams – were moved to safer streets and tracks to avoid destruction. Unfortunately, many cars parked on the streets of the city were rendered unusable after the flood.

=== Euro 2012 ===
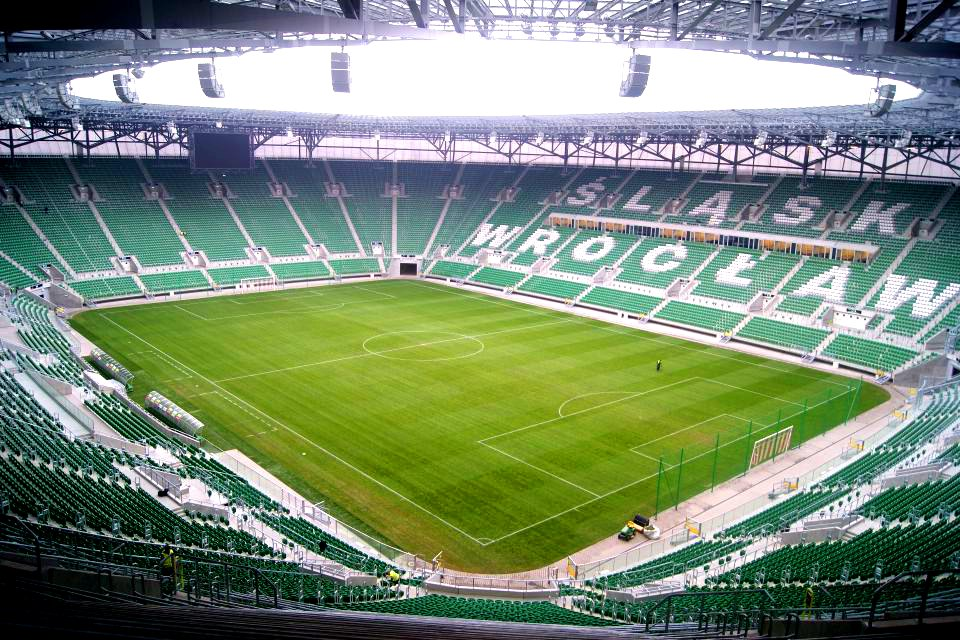
Wrocław Stadium built for EURO 2012, where a world boxing championship match between Tomasz Adamek and Vitali Klitschko was held for its opening

Wrocław was one of the host cities for the UEFA Euro 2012. Wrocław Stadium hosted several matches, including Russia vs. Czech Republic, Greece vs. Czech Republic, and Czech Republic vs. Poland. Prior to the tournament, the city undertook extensive preparations, including the construction of a new stadium with accompanying infrastructure. A new railway station, Wrocław Stadion, was also opened near the stadium. The cost of building the stadium, which holds over 40,000 spectators, exceeded 850 million PLN. Additionally, the main railway station in Wrocław underwent a thorough renovation.

=== Sister cities ===
After 1989, the idea of sister cities, fostering cultural, social, and economic exchange, revived. Wrocław has traditionally worked closely with Dresden, renewing its partnership agreement in 1991. By 2017, Wrocław had signed partnership agreements with the following cities:

- Dresden – agreement renewed in 1991
- Guadalajara – 1995
- Ramat Gan – 1997
- Lviv – 2001
- Kaunas – 2003
- Hradec Králové – 2003
- Grodno – 2005
- Lille – 2013
- Vilnius – 2014
- Reykjavík – 2017

=== Timeline ===
- 1990 – On 6 February, the first private television station in post-communist countries, PTV Echo, began broadcasting. Initially, the program was aired for 4 hours a day; the station was shut down in 1995.
- 1991 – The last train departed from the Wrocław Świebodzki railway station after 148 years of operation, and most of the tracks were dismantled. In the first decade of the 21st century, the largest market in the city was located here.
- 1992 – The names of several dozen streets referring to the previous system were changed, including Karol Świerczewski to Marshal Józef Piłsudski, Armii Radzieckiej to Karkonoska, Przodowników Pracy to Gen. Józef Haller, and Tadeusz Ślężak to Anioła Ślązaka.
- 1994 – A major fire at the Wrocław Polish Theatre in January caused significant damage; the theatre was rebuilt and modernized for over 2 years.
- 1997 – The Eucharistic congress in late May and early June marked another visit by Pope John Paul II. The main celebrations took place near the city center, at the undeveloped square between Powstańców Śląskich and Gwiaździsta streets.
- 2010 – Due to the renovation of the main railway station, the Dworcowe Cinema, which had been operating since 1947, was closed. It was the longest-running cinema at a railway station in post-war Poland.
- 2011 – On 30 August, the Wrocław Motorway Bypass was opened.
- 2013 – On 1 October, Polinka, a cable car connecting the university with the southern bank of the Oder river, was opened.
- 2017 – In October, the Wroclavia shopping mall was opened, and in November, the underground Wrocław central bus station built beneath it was inaugurated.

== See also ==
- History of Wrocław

== Bibliography ==
- Okólska, Halina (2005). Władze miejskie Wrocławia w latach 1945–1948 [Municipal Authorities of Wrocław in 1945–1948] (in Polish). Wrocław: Rada Miejska Wrocławia. ISBN 83-919528-4-3.
- Harasimowicz, Jan, ed. (2006). Encyklopedia Wrocławia [Encyclopedia of Wrocław] (in Polish). Wrocław: Wydawnictwo Dolnośląskie. ISBN 83-7384-561-5.
