= Bonifacy Jedynak =

Polish brigadier general of Citizen's Militia

- Born: 15 January 1920; Czarniecka Góra
- Died: 27 July 2013 (aged 93); Warsaw
- Burial place: Northern Communal Cemetery, Warsaw
- Military career
- Allegiance: Polish People's Republic
- Branch: People's Guard; People's Army; Milicja Obywatelska; Security Service
- Service years: 1945-1986
- Rank: Generał brygady (Brigadier general)
- Units: Voivodeship Headquarters of the Citizens' Militia in Wrocław "B" Office of Ministry of Interior
- Commands: Director of HR department of Ministry of Interior; General director, head of the human resources and profesional development
- Conflicts: Second World War
- Awards

Bonifacy Jedynak (15 January 1920 - 27 July 2013) was a Polish brigadier general of Citizen's Militia and patient zero of the 1963 smallpox epidemic in Wrocław.

== Biography ==
He was born in Czarniecka Góra as a son of Józef nad Waleria. During the Second World War he was a member of People's Guard and People's Army. After the end of the war he joined security authorities and began his service in District Office of Public Security in Końskie. In the years 1947-1948 he took part in a special course for Public Security deputy chiefs held in Legionowo. After that he was assigned to District Office of Public Security in Opole on the position of deputy chief. In the years 1954-1964 he was serving in Wrocław in Voivodeship Headquarters of the Citizens' Militia. During his service in Wrocław he reached in position of 1st deputy commander for public security. While serving in Wrocław he was sent to Polish diplomatic missions in Hungary (1961), Bulgaria (1965), USSR, Czechoslovakia (1967), Vietnam (1971). He was the patient zero of the smallpox epidemic in Wrocław which he brought from one of his journeys to Asia in 1963. He checked into hospital of the Ministry of Interior and infected one of the nurses. In 1964 he was transferred to the Ministry of Interior headquarters in Warsaw, where he served in "B" Office, responsible for observing the foreign diplomats staying in Polish People's Republic. In 1973 he became a director of HR department of Ministry of Interior. On October 9, 1980, he was promoted to the rank of brigadier general. In the years 1981-1985 he held the position of general director, head of the human resources and professional development. He retired on July 5, 1985. He was a member of Polish Workers' Party and Polish United Workers' Party. He died on July 27, 2013 and was buried in Northern Communal Cemetery in Warsaw.

== Awards and decorations ==
- Commander's Cross of the Order of Polonia Restituta (1984)

== Bibliography ==
- Catalogue of BIP IPN
- Faces of the Security Service 1944–1990, Institute of National Remembrance, Commission for the Prosecution of Crimes against the Polish Nation
