= 1963 Wrocław smallpox epidemic =

Disease outbreak in Poland

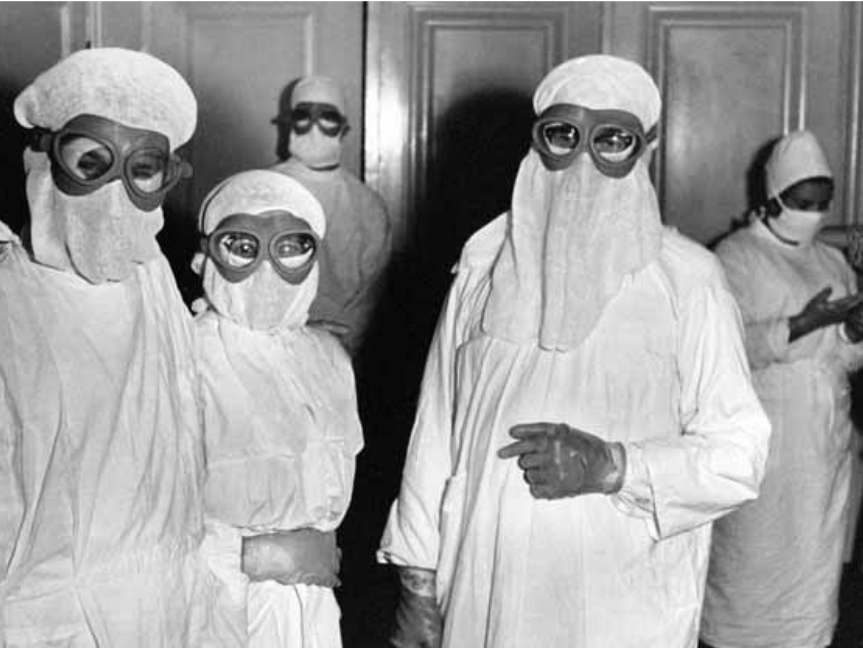
- Protective clothing worn by health workers during the epidemic
- Disease: Smallpox
- Pathogen: Variola vera
- Location: Polish People's Republic
- Index case: A public officer returning from India (or another Asian country)
- Dates: 17 July – 19 September 1963
- Confirmed cases: 99
- Deaths: 7

The smallpox epidemic in Wrocław was the last outbreak of smallpox in Poland and one of the last in Europe (the 1972 Yugoslav smallpox outbreak was last) and the biggest disease outbreak in Europe until the COVID-19 pandemic. It broke out in the summer of 1963. The disease was brought to Poland in May by Bonifacy Jedynak, an officer of the Security Service (Służba Bezpieczeństwa), returning from India (according to other sources, from Burma or Vietnam).

The first fatal victim was a nurse, the daughter of a hospital cleaner, who had been in contact with the infected individual. The state of epidemic was declared on July 17 and lifted on September 19. A total of 99 people contracted the disease (most of them healthcare workers), of whom seven died, including four doctors and nurses. The youngest patient was five months old, the oldest was 83.

The city was paralyzed and isolated from the rest of the country by a sanitary cordon for several weeks. Although the disease spread beyond Wrocław, it was treated in five voivodeships. A large-scale prevention program was implemented: individuals suspected of contact with patients were placed in isolation facilities, located, among others, on Stabłowicka Street (Pracze Odrzańskie) and Kiełczowska Street (Psie Pole). In the village of Szczodre, a hospital for smallpox patients was organized.

== Epidemiological and legal situation in Poland ==
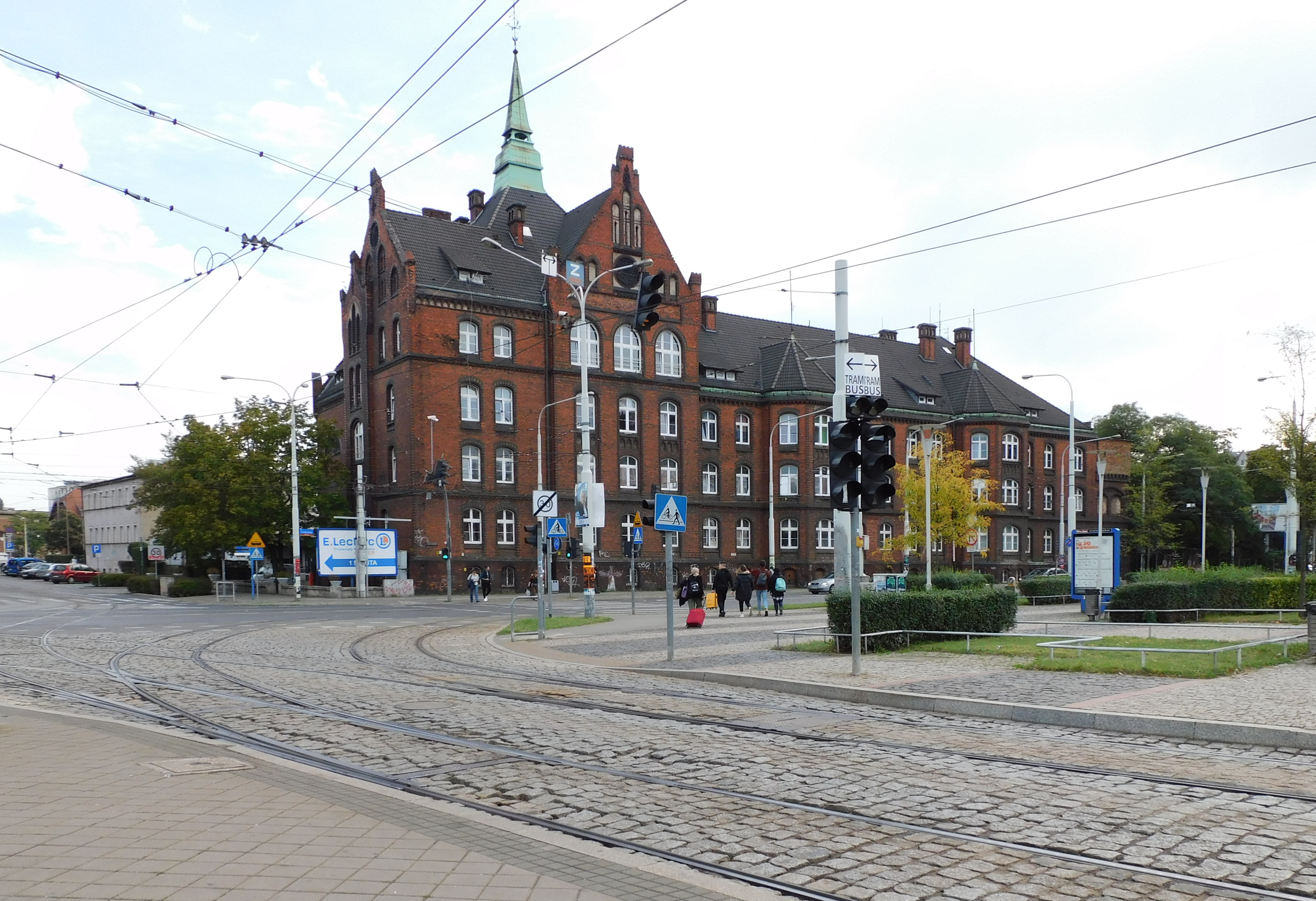
Hospital on Ołbińska Street, where “patient zero”, Bonifacy Jedynak was treated

Between 1945 and 1962, there were 69 outbreaks of smallpox recorded in Europe, with the decade immediately after the war seeing the highest number of cases. In only six of those outbreaks did the number of infections exceed one hundred. In Poland, smallpox appeared twice during that period: in 1953 (13 cases) and in 1962 in Gdańsk, where 29 people fell ill.

Despite this, there were no comprehensive epidemic response procedures in place. Legally, the country was still operating under the Act on the Prevention and Control of Infectious Diseases of February 21, 1935. After the Gdańsk incidents, mandatory smallpox vaccinations every three years were introduced for healthcare workers. However, there was a lack of proper training — at the time the epidemic threat was announced, only three doctors in Wrocław had first-hand experience with smallpox, and their expertise was not utilized.

== Patient zero ==
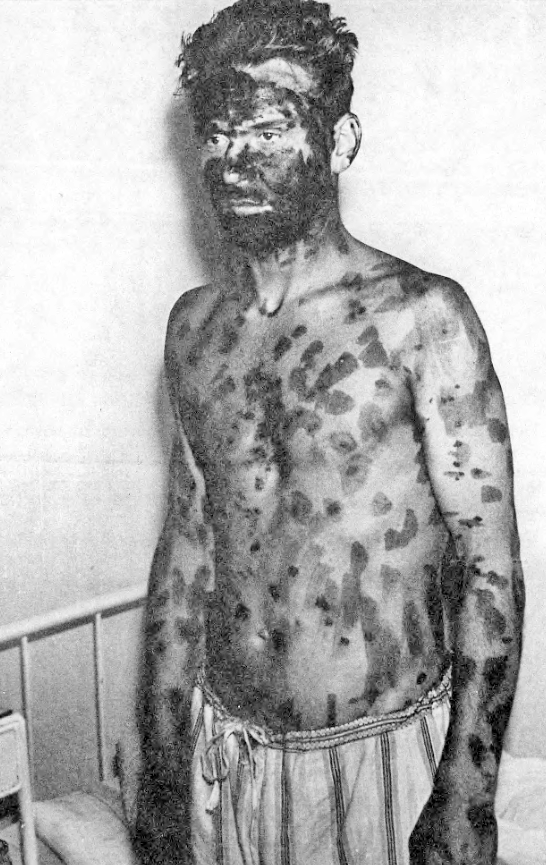
A patient with smallpox rash covered with disinfectant during an epidemic in Wrocław, Poland in 1963

The disease was brought to Poland by Bonifacy Jedynak, a Polish officer and Lieutenant Colonel (later a General and Director General in the Ministry of the Interior’s Department of Personnel and Professional Development) of the Security Service (SB). He had returned to Wrocław on May 22, 1963, after inspecting facilities in Delhi, India, traveling under a false name with a forged health certificate.

After his return, he developed an unknown infectious disease and on June 2 (according to some sources, May 29) reported to the Ministry of the Interior Hospital on Ołbińska Street in Wrocław. Following consultations with the Institute of Tropical Medicine in Gdańsk, doctors diagnosed him with malaria (parasites were found in his blood). After a brief hospital stay, he recovered and was discharged home in mid-June.

In reality, besides malaria, he was also infected with the smallpox virus. During his hospital stay, he infected only one person: either a nurse who had mild symptoms and was believed to have chickenpox, or a cleaning woman (hospital attendant). This person later became the secondary source of the epidemic. Her son, daughter, and the attending doctor were subsequently infected, and all three later died.

== Progress of epidemic ==
The first fatal victim of the Wrocław smallpox epidemic was Lonia Kowalczyk, a nurse, who died on July 8, 1963. She was the daughter of the cleaning woman who had cleaned the isolation room of the infected officer from India.

The cleaning woman herself contracted a mild form of smallpox (initially misdiagnosed as chickenpox) and recovered. However, her daughter's illness was severe and initially misdiagnosed as leukemia due to a sudden, extreme increase in white blood cell count (a leukemoid reaction). Lonia Kowalczyk was buried several days later, despite regulations requiring burial within 24 hours. The infection spread to the cleaning woman's son and then to Dr. Stefan Zawada, the physician she had consulted. Smallpox was still not recognized—the rash was misdiagnosed as chickenpox—and both the son and the doctor also died later.

== Diagnosis ==
On July 15, 1963, 47 days after the first case of the disease (later called "Black Monday"; Polish: Czarny Poniedziałek), an anti-epidemic emergency was announced in the city. Ten thousand vaccines were delivered from the Polish capital, Warsaw, that day. Around 1 million vaccines were subsequently delivered from the Soviet Union and Hungary.

Recognition that a smallpox (Variola vera) epidemic was spreading in Wrocław is credited to Dr. Bogumił Arendzikowski of the Municipal Sanitary-Epidemiological Station, who analyzed all unexplained infectious cases.

One key case involved a four-year-old boy who, after recently recovering from chickenpox, developed a new smallpox rash — something extremely rare, as chickenpox infection provides lifelong immunity. This case became the turning point in identifying the epidemic on July 15, 1963.

Dr. Arendzikowski immediately contacted his superior, Dr. Jerzy Rodziewicz, the head of the Sanitary Inspectorate (Sanepid), who promptly notified the authorities in Warsaw.

== Course of the epidemic ==
=== Beginnings ===
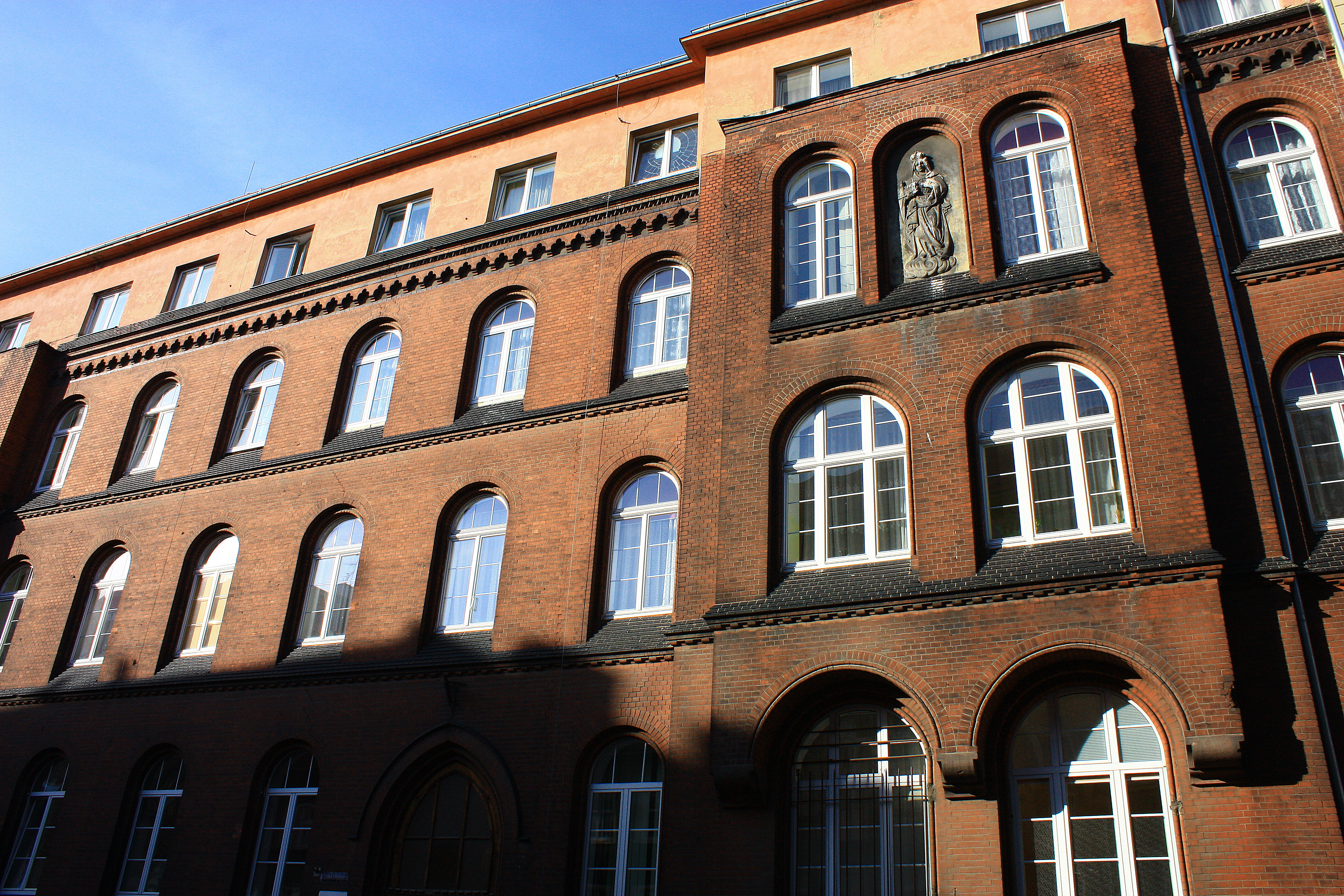
Hospital on Rydygiera Street, one of three facilities of this type closed during the epidemic

Supervision over the entire operation, called VV or O, was carried out by Deputy Minister of Health and Chief Sanitary Inspector Jan Kostrzewski, who was delegated to Wrocław. The most important decisions were made during meetings of the newly established Epidemiological Council, composed of Wrocław doctors and Ministry of Health officials; among them was also a doctor from Gdańsk — the city that had dealt with a smallpox outbreak the year before.

The first isolation center was set up on July 18 in the building of the Agricultural Mechanization Technical School in Pracze Odrzańskie, on the northwestern edge of the city, with about 360 beds. In addition, an observation hospital was opened in the dormitory of the Engine-Building Technical School in Psie Pole. Three hospitals were closed: the infectious diseases hospital on Piwna Street, the municipal hospital on Rydygiera Street, and the ministry hospital on Ołbińska Street.

On July 17, in Szczodre, northeast of the city, an epidemic hospital and quarantine center was established, directed by Dr. Alicja Surowiec. Five patients were admitted immediately. Additional isolation centers were created, and four hospitals were placed under quarantine; in total, 1,462 people suspected of contact with the virus were isolated. The Szczodre hospital was divided into three wards, each serving as a separate isolation area: patients with smallpox symptoms stayed in the first ward, where treatment lasted 36 days. The children’s ward housed nine girls and six boys, aged from five months to twelve years. A strict ban on movement within the hospital was enforced. Since there were fears that the Szczodre hospital might prove too small, a second facility was prepared in Prząśnik, Legnica County, in the building of the Provincial Dermatological Hospital.

At the same time, authorities decided to declare an alert and impose mandatory vaccination for all residents of Wrocław. However, the population was not yet informed about the epidemic; the first, rather vague, signal was an article published on July 18 in Gazeta Robotnicza, mentioning five people diagnosed with smallpox symptoms. A week later, the same paper published a list of people sought for contact with the infected.

On July 19, under the chairmanship of Prof. Bolesław Iwaszkiewicz, the Wrocław National Council established a coordination committee to support the Anti-Epidemic Council. Other working groups were also formed: for Smallpox Contacts, Diagnostics and Consultations, Quarantine, Isolation Centers, Economic and Financial Matters, Transport and Communication, Care for Families of Isolated Persons, Vaccinations, the Szczodre Hospital Team, and a Disinfection Team. From Gdańsk, additional smallpox specialists were brought in: Dr. Andrzej Gajda and Prof. Wiktor Bincer, head of the Clinic and Department of Infectious Diseases. The epidemic command headquarters was located in the National Council building on Zapolska Street.

On the first official day of the epidemic, priority was given to isolating the sick and those who had contact with them. A mass vaccination campaign was also launched, initially excluding newborns, women up to the fifth month of pregnancy, and chronically ill persons; this decision was reversed on August 1, and vaccination became universal—even when medical contraindications existed. During the entire epidemic, 98% of Wrocław’s residents were vaccinated. That same day, regular medical training sessions began for doctors on smallpox control; as a result, 50 Polish doctors and two Hungarian doctors were trained.

=== Further course ===
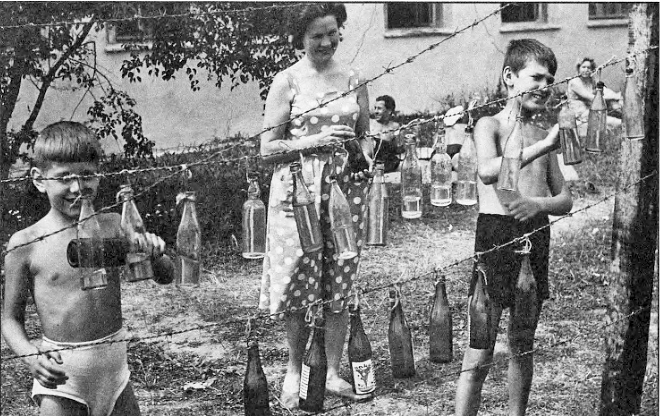
Isolation center in Psie Pole

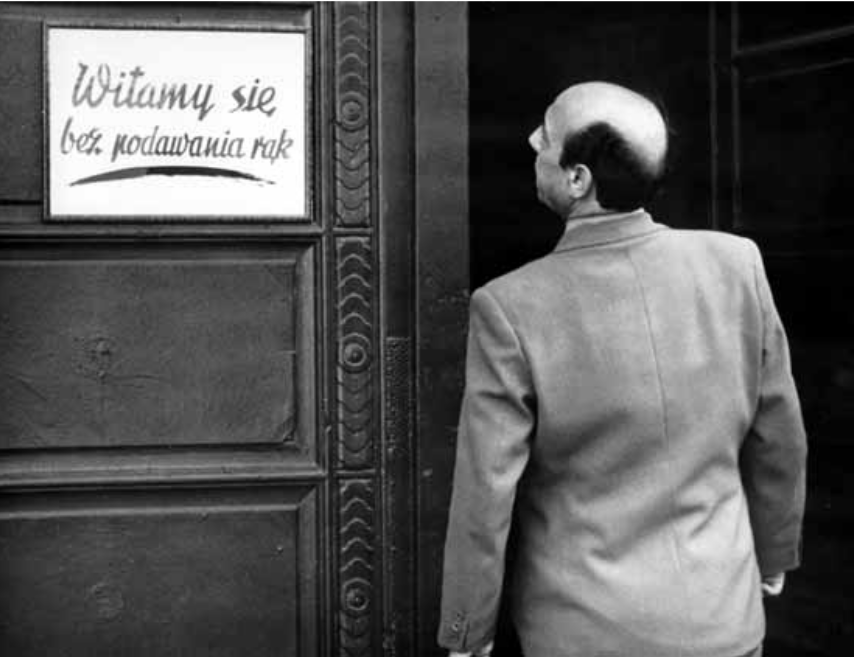
Reminder about caution in personal contact

After initial chaotic measures, a procedure was established. Each new suspected smallpox case was verified by a consulting physician. Visiting doctors wore special protective clothing, consisting of white canvas pants, a jacket, cap, gloves, and rubber boots. Residents nicknamed them “the dress-ups,” “carolers,” “stuntmen,” “clowns,” or “Judym doctors of the epidemic.” The consultant’s decision was final.

If the disease was confirmed or suspected, patients were sent to hospital; in unclear cases, they stayed home pending another examination. People who had contact with the sick were isolated after vaccination, while secondary contacts were subjected to five days of sanitary supervision after vaccination.

According to Dr. Michał Sobkowy, who served as a duty inspection physician in Wrocław’s ambulance service during the epidemic, the protection of doctors visiting suspected patients was far from adequate:

“The sanitary inspectors were a different story — they were completely covered when visiting smallpox patients. Even their eyes were shielded; they spoke with patients through a plastic sheet that was part of the face covering,” he told Newsweek.

For logistical support, cars were confiscated from Wrocław enterprises to transport infected or quarantined individuals. It was decreed that if workplaces disobeyed the order, their directors would be punished within 24 hours, and their names published in the press.

Despite strict measures, the disease spread beyond Wrocław and even beyond Lower Silesia. On July 19, a person in Opole who had contact with patient zero (B. Jedynak) fell ill. Correct diagnosis came only five days later, after an initial misdiagnosis of chickenpox. By then, he had already infected two others. By July 24, cases were confirmed in Oława and Legnica, and later in Wieruszów and Gdańsk.

Meanwhile, authorities tried to track the epidemic’s progress, which often proved difficult—for instance, searching for a taxi driver who had transported an infected passenger, known only to have worn a checkered shirt and driven a Warszawa-brand car. Panic rose when a tram driver from line 0, which connected Wrocław’s main railway stations (Główny, Nadodrze, and Świebodzki), fell ill.

On July 22, from the Szczodre hospital, the first fatality’s body was removed—the same day the hospital had opened. Four days later, there were no free beds left in the isolation centers. The last fatal victim was Dr. Stefan Zawada, who died on August 5. Only on August 16 did the Polish Film Chronicle broadcast footage about the epidemic in Wrocław. Three days later, the isolation center in Pracze Odrzańskie was closed.

On July 29, in Wieruszów, a woman died who had been infected in early July at the Rydygier Hospital. This was the only death outside Wrocław during the epidemic. On August 1, Gazeta Robotnicza published Prof. Iwaszkiewicz’s announcement that the epidemic had reached its peak and that the virus was now in retreat. However, that same day, mandatory smallpox vaccination was introduced.

At that time, another isolation facility was prepared in the “Labirynt” student dormitory on Grunwaldzki Square, and another (never used) one at the Inland Navigation Technical School.

On August 1, at a press conference, Prof. Iwaszkiewicz said:

“The weakened virus will affect only a very small number of unvaccinated people or those with weak immunity between August 1 and 15. Therefore, after August 15, the number of cases should drop sharply. Although isolated cases may still occur, everything indicates that the situation is already under control.”

On August 10, the last case of smallpox occurred outside hospitals or isolation centers. Two days later, the Szczodre hospital housed 50 patients. By August 14, the number of daily medical consultations regarding smallpox had fallen to ten per day, and by August 31, only four to six were reported daily. The Epidemiological Council decided that 32 days after the last case, it would request that the Minister of Health officially declare Wrocław free of smallpox. By the end of August, isolation centers began closing, starting with the one in Pracze Odrzańskie.

The dynamics of the disease course are presented in the following table:

Epidemic stage	Duration	Number of cases	Number of deaths
Initial phase	May 19 – June 14	1	0
Phase II	June 15 – July 8	4	1
Phase III	9 – 20 July	21	1
Phase IV (peak)	21 – 28 July	44	3
Phase V (decline)	July 29 – August 6	20	1
Phase VI (residual)	after August 7	4	0

== The city during the pandemic ==
=== Restrictions ===
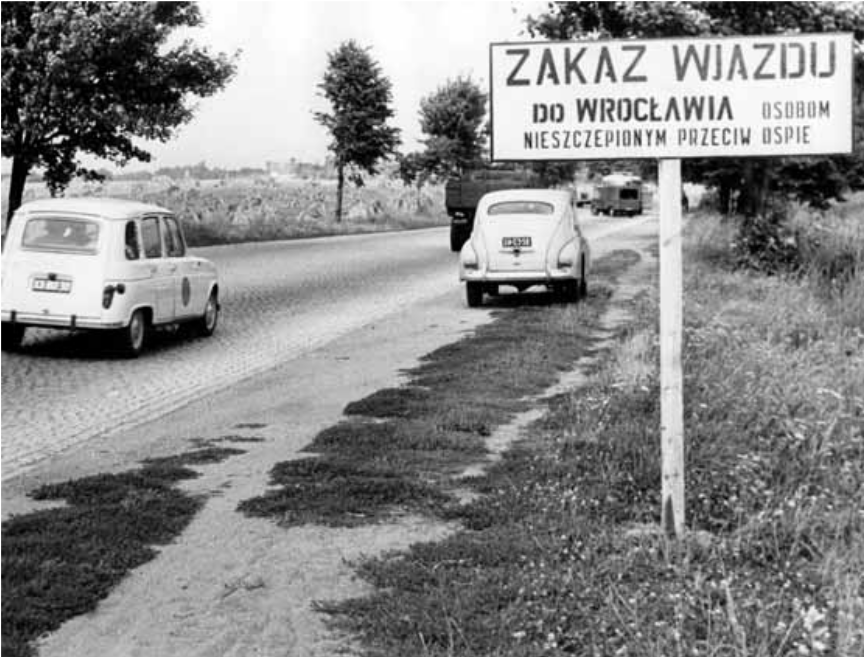
Sign noting the restriction of entry into Wrocław

Around the time of the national holiday on July 22, the fact that there was an epidemic had become obvious to the residents of Wrocław. Nevertheless, the official celebrations of the holiday and the traditionally held Wrocław Flower Festival were not canceled.

However, the city was far from normal. Door handles in public buildings were wrapped in bandages soaked with chloramine, as were ticket office windows at train stations and the airport. People also had to disinfect their hands in bowls filled with chloramine. Posters appeared around the city with the slogan “We greet and say goodbye without shaking hands.”

Wrocław became a city surrounded by a sanitary cordon: on exit roads, citizen militia patrols checked travelers’ documents and vaccination certificates; at railway stations, tickets were not sold to those unable to show proof of vaccination. Anyone found unvaccinated could face a fine of up to 4,500 złoty (four times the average monthly wage at that time) or three months of detention. Refusing treatment and thereby endangering others carried a penalty of up to 15 years in prison.

Penalties were indeed enforced: 40 people were punished; 10 were summoned before a misdemeanor board, and 6 were sentenced. Authorities also had to deal with attempts by people assigned to isolation centers to escape from the city—for this reason, they were often picked up at night.

In addition, the state border was closed along the section of Wrocław Voivodeship with the German Democratic Republic and the Czechoslovak Socialist Republic to tourist and local traffic. Crossing the border was allowed only with a passport, and vaccination points were established at border crossings.

Restrictions also affected everyday life, including trade. On August 3, self-service bread sales were suspended, out of fear that multiple people touching loaves could spread the virus. Despite the scorching summer—known as the “summer of the century”—all swimming pools were closed. The city’s sobering-up stations were also shut down.

Beyond these public restrictions, Wrocław’s residents faced social exclusion. They were unwelcome in seaside resorts, often refused reservations at vacation spots, and in some cases turned back from foreign trips—as happened to a doctor who, after working in an isolation ward, attempted to go on vacation to Bulgaria. On the orders of the Polish authorities, he was stopped at the border, and the press launched a smear campaign against him.

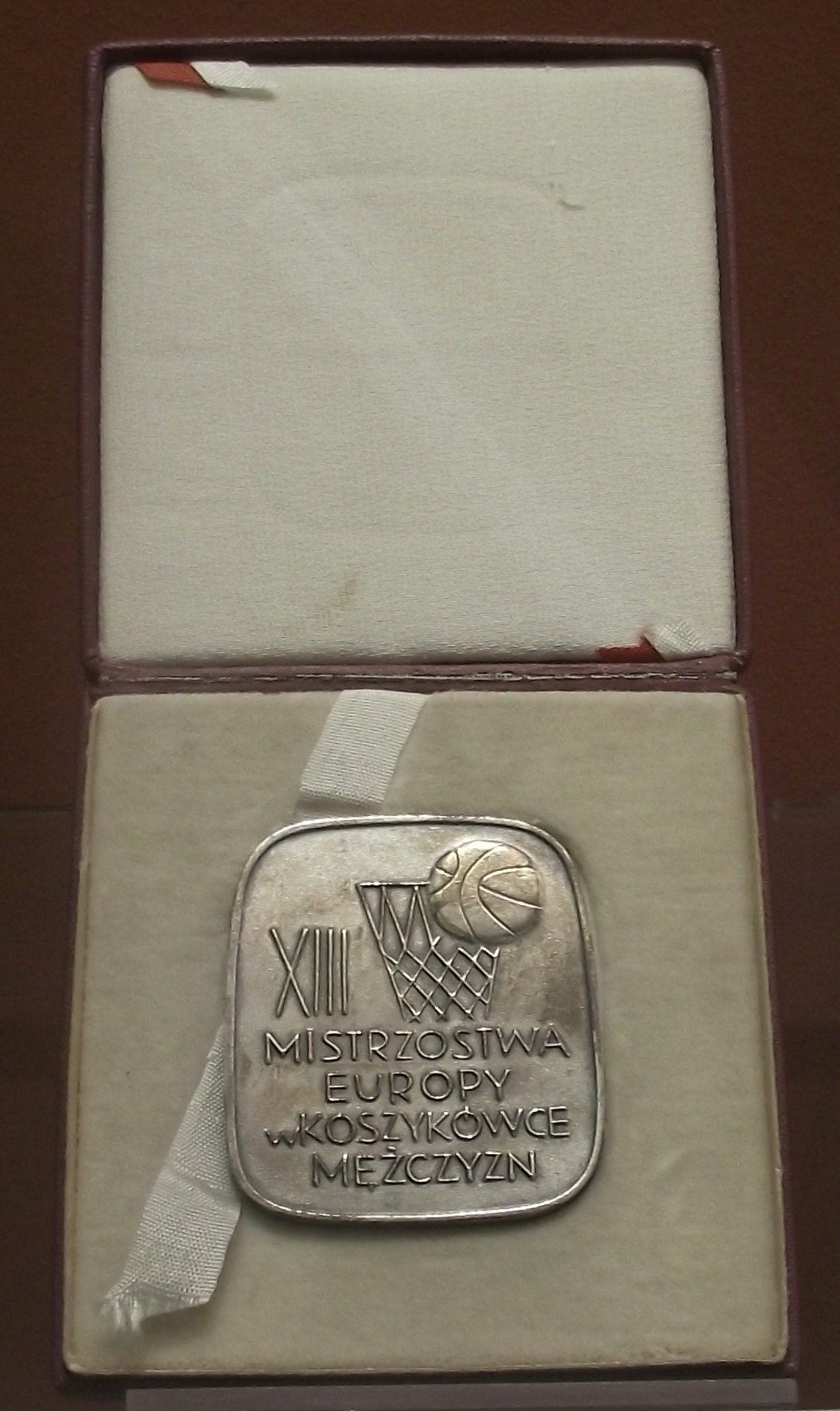
Poland’s men’s basketball team won the silver medal at those championships, held less than a month after the epidemic ended

Because of the epidemic, there was discussion about canceling the 1963 European Basketball Championships, which were to be hosted in Wrocław. The city’s epidemic committee recommended cancellation, while the organizing committee argued that the event should proceed as planned. The Fédération Internationale de Basketball (FIBA) was informed, though the players themselves were not told about the epidemic.

However, FIBA’s Secretary-General, Renato William Jones, believed the championships should still be held in Poland. Łódź was considered as an alternative host city (it had hosted the women’s championships five years earlier), but a month before the tournament, the decision was made to keep Wrocław as the venue. On October 4 at 4 p.m., the games were officially opened by Adam Rapacki.

During the epidemic, the attitudes of Wrocław’s citizens changed dramatically. As local journalist and historian Bogdan Daleszak wrote:

“Smallpox fought the epidemic of bureaucracy... No one waited for paperwork, notifications, receipts, or decrees. During that time, offices didn’t ‘bureaucratize’—they worked; activists didn’t ‘act’—they labored. Trivial matters were truly trivial and handled immediately, while difficult ones did not mean impossible.”

=== Information ===
The first news about smallpox in Wrocław appeared two days after the state of emergency was declared, on the last page of the local newspaper Słowo Polskie:

“In the past several days, five cases have been recorded and hospitalized in Wrocław, whose course so far does not exclude the possibility of smallpox.”

At that moment, about 20 people were already infected. Residents of Wrocław and people across Poland were informed through the press, which published epidemic command decrees. One of the few ways isolated residents could communicate with their families—besides the limited telephone access (long-distance calls required operators and were restricted)—was radio. The local Polish Radio station broadcast short messages to those in quarantine daily at 5:45 p.m. The postal service also introduced a special phone number (019), through which these broadcasts were replayed. The first serious announcement, which openly acknowledged the gravity of the situation, was broadcast on July 25—ten days after it had been written. Local press articles were censored with particular thoroughness and underwent substantive consultation. The first on-the-ground reports showing the true situation only appeared when journalists arrived from Kraków and Warsaw, over whom the local censors had no control.

Because of poor information, rumors spread throughout Poland—that people were dying on the streets of Wrocław, that bodies lay on sidewalks. When a disinfection chamber was delivered to the isolation center in Pracze Odrzańskie, people believed it was a crematorium for burning the dead.

There were also wild rumors about how the disease entered the city: brought by a circus, where a tightrope dancer had an affair with an officer, or by a black man covered in sores, whom doctors misdiagnosed with scabies.

=== Isolation ===
Specific daily life developed in isolation centers, which housed 989 people (out of 2,500 prepared spots). Strict regulations were enforced: gatherings were forbidden, even among staff. A detailed schedule covered chores, cleaning, and laundry—clothes had to be soaked in chloramine solution before washing.

Most patients—who jokingly called themselves “the interned”—behaved calmly and with dignity. However, alcohol abuse was a recurring problem despite strict inspection of packages and efforts to maintain discipline.

For troublemakers, a punishment isolation unit was established at the sobering-up center on Sokolnicza Street, led by Dr. Leopold Arendt. Patients complained about food quality and demanded cigarettes, alcohol, and even a jukebox. In the Psie Pole isolation center, drunken prostitutes ran naked through the corridors.

One element of disease control was quarantine, overseen by a five-person team led by Wanda Kocielska. After each confirmed case, investigators traced first- and second-degree contacts. Those in first-degree contact were immediately isolated; those in second-degree contact were placed under five-day observation. Buildings used for quarantine were guarded by militia officers.

In private conversations, people avoided saying “smallpox,” instead calling it “the Black Lady” (Polish: Czarna Pani).

=== Disinfection ===
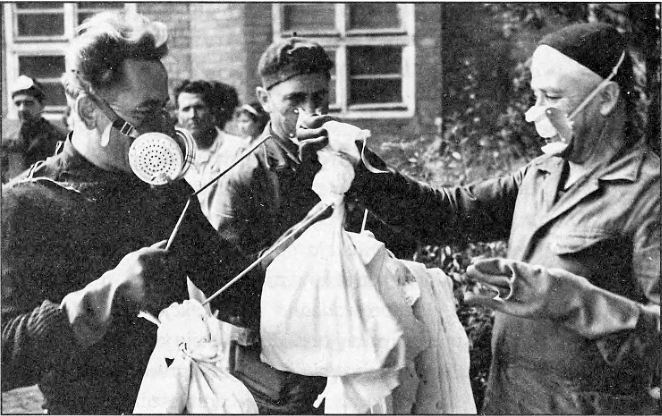
Disinfecting clothing in the Pracze Odrzańskie isolation center

Disinfection was one of the key measures to stop the spread of the virus and prevent secondary infections. A disinfection, disinsection, and deratization group was created at the end of July 1963, with permanent stations in Psie Pole, Pracze, and the Szczodre hospital.

Three types of disinfection were carried out:

1. Preventive disinfection
2. Disinfection of smallpox outbreak sites
3. Final disinfection

Preventive disinfection included equipment, rooms, clothing, bodily fluids, air, soil, corpses, and even objects of daily use, such as money. Methods included disinfection chambers, germicidal lamps, and chemicals such as chloramine and chlorinated lime. People entering buildings had to step on straw mats soaked in disinfectant, and door handles were wrapped in gauze soaked with chloramine. Floors had to be disinfected twice daily.

Ambulances were disinfected after each patient, and final disinfection was done in hospitals and isolation centers once patients had left. Homes of infected persons were also disinfected, requiring residents to hand over their keys, which often caused reluctance—so the process was carried out with militia assistance.

After July 30, regulations were eased: only the homes of the sick were disinfected.

== Vaccinations and treatment ==
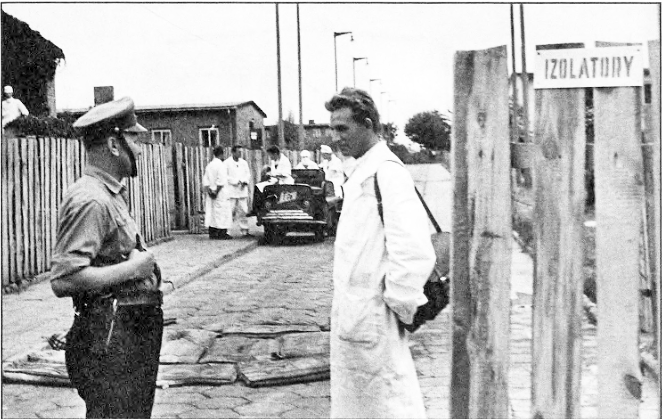
Arrival at the isolation ward

A network of smallpox vaccination points was organized, covering all residents of the city (about 500,000 people) as well as a significant number of people from outside Wrocław. In total, 8.2 million people in Poland were vaccinated (according to the Statistical Yearbook, 7.881 million), including two million in Lower Silesia. Vaccination was mandatory for everyone — later even for those with medical contraindications. From August 5, refusal to be vaccinated was punishable by up to three months in prison or a fine of 4,500 złoty.

The smallpox vaccine was made from an artificial strain of the virus grown on cows. The vaccination was performed by applying the cowpox material to the arm and then making about 30 punctures with a needle or scarifier. After vaccination, it was necessary to check whether the vaccine had taken effect (after 4–5 days); if there was no reaction after three attempts, a certificate was issued. Vaccinations began immediately after the epidemic was identified, and on July 20, the Ministry of Health decided to extend them to the entire country.

As a result of vaccinating even those for whom live vaccines were contraindicated, 9 deaths were recorded, and about one thousand vaccinated people experienced adverse reactions.

Number of vaccinations during the epidemic campaign:

Region	Number of people vaccinated
Wrocław and Wrocław Voivodeship	2,598,000
Opole Voivodeship	978,000
Katowice Voivodeship	724,200
Łódź and Łódź Voivodeship	499,700
Warsaw	465,700
Total	7,881,000

During the entire epidemic, 99 patients (including 25 healthcare workers) aged between 8 months and 83 years were treated for smallpox (86 of them hospitalized in Szczodre). Seven people died (including four medical personnel). Three patients came from outside Wrocław — from Opole, Wieruszów, and Gdańsk.

Treatment typically lasted around 40 days, including 36 days in a closed ward until the scabs had fallen off. Therapy included the administration of serum from the blood of vaccinated individuals. Afterward, patients were transferred to a secondary ward, where they bathed in a potassium permanganate solution. If symptoms had subsided by then, the patient could be discharged home, where they remained on 14 days of sick leave.

More than 350 healthcare workers took part in the fight against the virus.

== End of the pandemic ==
By the end of August, the process of closing the isolation facilities began. On September 2, a plan was set to liquidate the smallpox hospitals, deciding that patients from Szczodre would be released by September 14 and those from Prząśnik by September 17. However, if any further cases occurred, they would be handled by the hospital in Szczodre.

On September 19, after the quarantine of the last individuals exposed to the virus had ended, the epidemic was declared over and all restrictions were lifted. The document was signed by Dr. Jerzy Rodziewicz and Dr. Andrzej Ochlewski. The Wrocław smallpox epidemic was the last one recorded in Poland. On May 8, 1980, the World Health Assembly in Geneva announced the eradication of all Variola vera outbreaks worldwide.

In the television poll for “Person of the Year 1963,” Dr. Alicja Surowiec won first place.

== In the culture ==
The Wrocław epidemic in 1963 inspired several works of fiction, including Żołnierze grzechu (Soldiers of Sin) by Andrzej Ziemiański and Szczury Wrocławia (The Rats of Wrocław) by Robert Jerzy Szmidt, as well as the 1971 feature film Zaraza (The Plague), directed by Roman Załuski, based on the 1965 reportage book on the epidemic by Jerzy Ambroziewicz. The smallpox epidemic was also the subject of one episode of the documentary series Czarny serial (The Black Series).
