= Jagodno, Wrocław =

District in Wrocław, Poland

Jagodno
- District of Wrocław
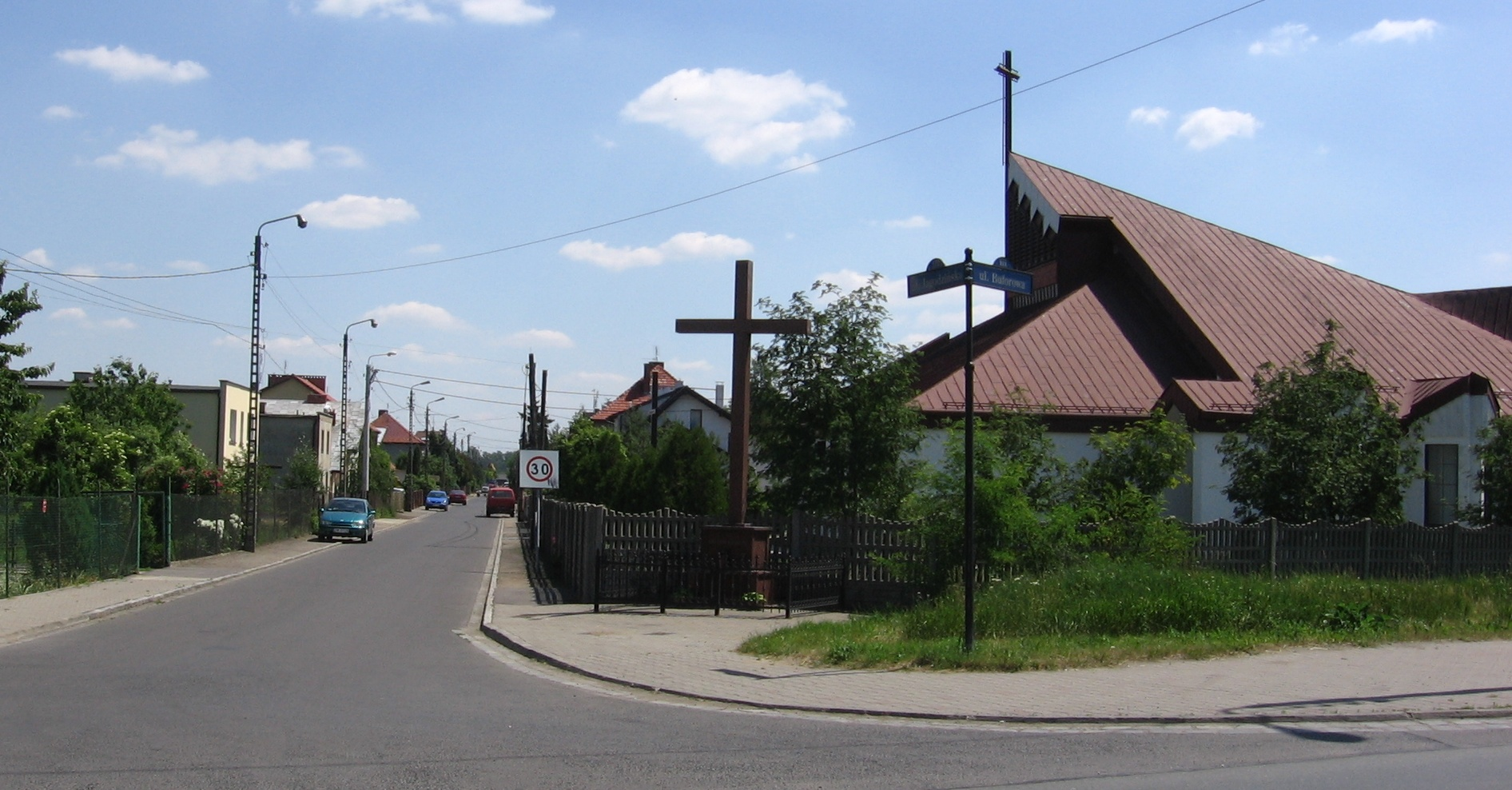

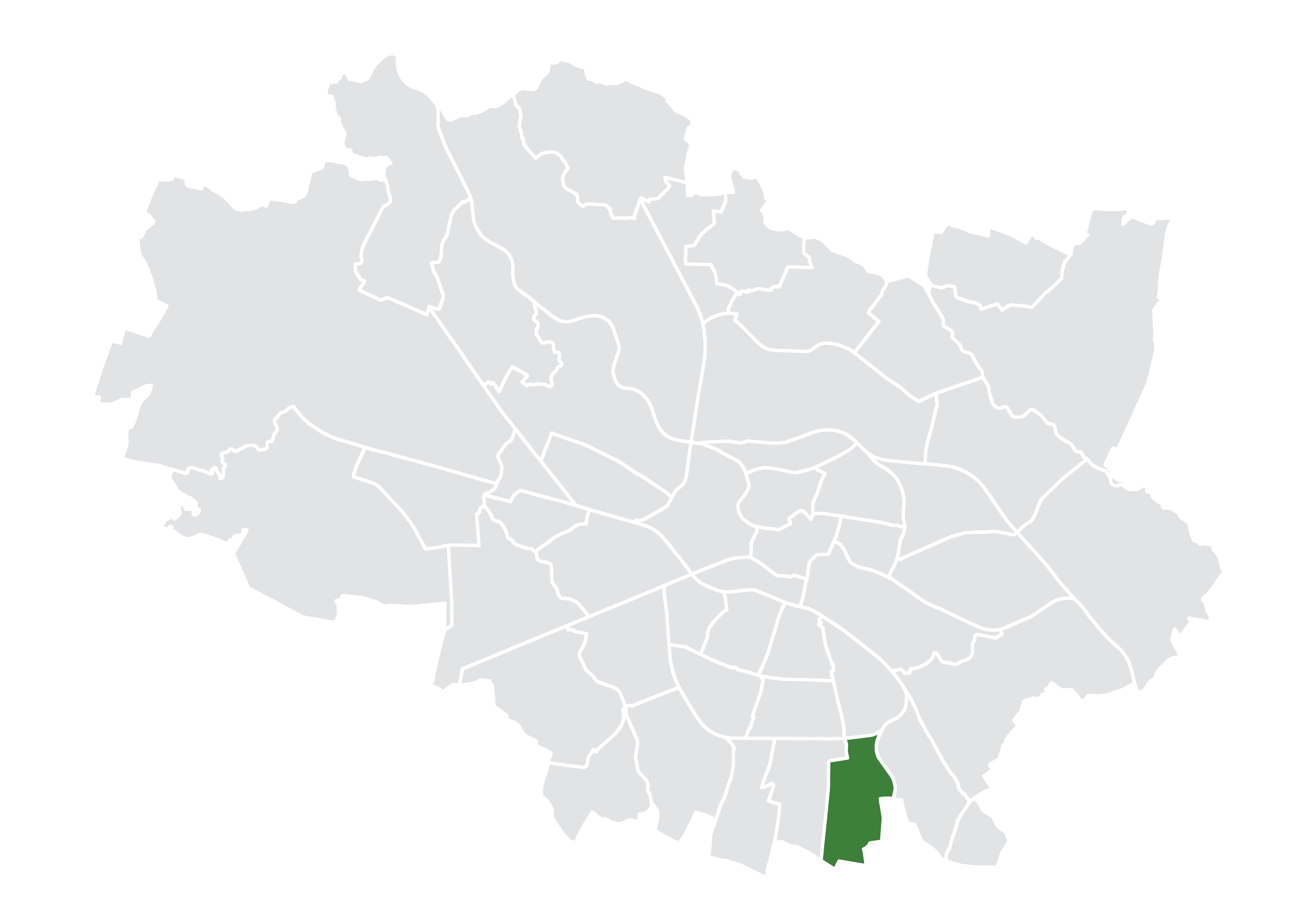
- Location of Jagodno within Wrocław
- Country: Poland
- Voivodeship: Lower Silesian
- County/City: Wrocław
- Incorporated into the city: 1951
- Established the modern-day district: 1991

Population (2022)
  - Total: 9,355
- Time zone: UTC+1 (CET)
  - Summer (DST): UTC+2 (CEST)
- Area code: +48 71
- Website: Osiedle Jagodno

Jagodno (Polish pronunciation: [jaˈgɔdnɔ]) is a district in Wrocław located in the southern part of the city. It was established in the territory of the former Krzyki district.

== History ==
The settlement was founded at the beginning of the 20th century as a colony of Brockau. It was called Lamsfeld Siedlung, a name that was borrowed from the neighboring village of Lamsfeld (Polish: Lamowice Stare).

On February 17, 1945, during the fights of the Siege of Breslau, it was captured and occupied by Red Army troops. After World War II, with the area having become a part of Poland, both Lamsfeld and Lamsfeld Siedlung were given the collective name of Jagodno.

The settlement was incorporated into Wrocław in 1951. In 1991, after reforms in the administrative division of Wrocław, Jagodno became one of the city's 48 districts.

In 2023, the district gained national attention during the parliamentary election, when the election commission in Jagodno ran out of ballots, causing long wait times for voters. The last ballots were cast around 3 a.m. after hours of waiting.

To honor the voters' persistence, the term 'jagodność' was coined, a wordplay on the words 'Jagodno' and 'godność' ('dignity'). The term was called the Wrocław Word of the Year 2023 by TuWrocław.com. Donald Tusk, a Prime Minister candidate, visited Jagodno to thank its voters for their "extraordinary determination and a strong signal to those in power."
