= History of Wrocław =

Historical affiliations

Silesians until 985
Duchy of Poland 985–1025
Kingdom of Poland 1025–1038
Duchy of Bohemia 1038–1054
Kingdom of Poland 1054–1320
Duchy of Silesia 1320–1348
Lands of the Bohemian Crown 1348–1526
Habsburg Empire 1526–1742
Kingdom of Prussia 1742–1918
North German Confederation 1867–1871
German Empire 1871–1918
Weimar Germany 1918–1933
Nazi Germany 1933–1945
Polish People's Republic 1945–1989
Republic of Poland 1989–present

Wrocław (German: Breslau) has long been the largest and culturally dominant city in Silesia, and is today the capital of Poland's Lower Silesian Voivodeship, and the country's third most populous city proper.

The history of Wrocław dates back over 1,000 years. In 1000, it became the seat of the Diocese of Wrocław, one of the oldest Catholic dioceses of Poland. Wrocław was one of the centres of the Duchy and then Kingdom of Poland, and briefly, in the first half of the 13th century, the centre of half of the divided Kingdom of Poland. German settlers arrived in increasing numbers after the first Mongol invasion of Poland in 1241. The city developed into an important centre of trade and later became part of the Bohemian Crown Lands and the Holy Roman Empire under the Treaty of Trentschin of 1335. In 1526, it came under Habsburg rule as part of the Bohemian Crown. After the War of Austrian Succession, Austria ceded the city and region to the Kingdom of Prussia in the Treaty of Breslau of 1742. Following the unification of Germany, Breslau became part of the German Reich in 1871. The city was the economic, cultural and scientific centre of eastern Germany with the University of Breslau producing nine Nobel Prize laureates. During World War II, the Nazis operated multiple forced labour camps and prisons throughout the city. In the final phase of the war, the city was besieged by the Red Army in the Battle of Breslau and suffered extensive destruction as a result of the combat. After the war, the city became part of Poland and the German-speaking majority of its population was expelled to the remainder of Germany in accordance with the Potsdam Agreement.

== Origin ==
The city of Wrocław originated as a stronghold situated at the intersection of two long-existing trading routes, the Via Regia and the Amber Road. The city was founded in the 10th century, possibly by a local duke Wrocisław, who may also be the city's namesake. At the time the city was limited to the district of Ostrów Tumski (the Cathedral Island) and was first mentioned by Thietmar of Merseburg in 1000 as "Wrotizlava".

== Poland ==
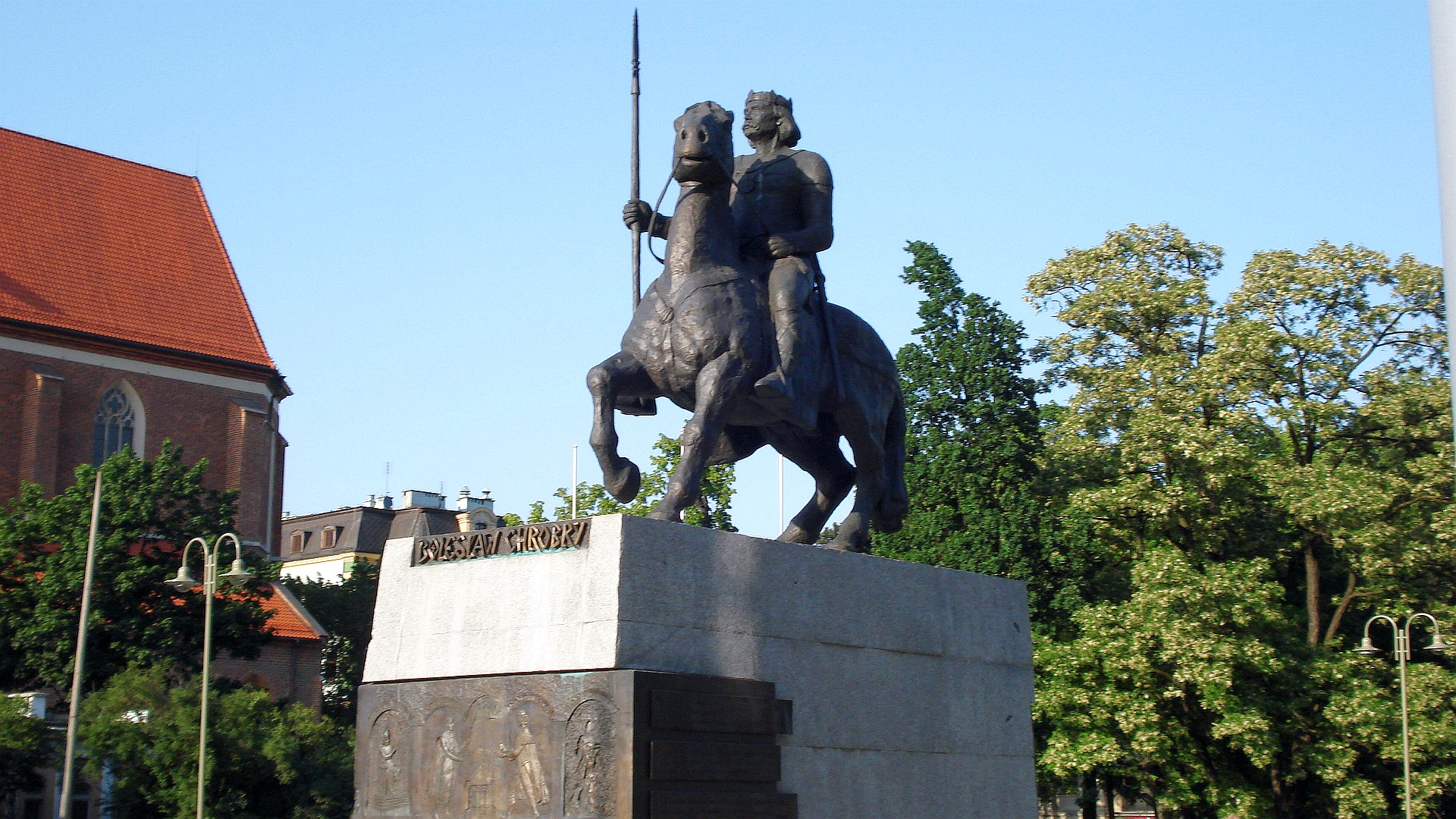
Monument to King Bolesław I the Brave in Wrocław

In 985 Duke Mieszko I of Poland of the Piast dynasty conquered Silesia and Wrocław. In 1000 Mieszko's son, Duke and future King Bolesław I of Poland, in the then capital of Poland, Gniezno, established the Bishopric of Wrocław (as one of the oldest bishoprics of Poland and the first bishopric of Silesia) along with the bishoprics of Kraków and Kołobrzeg and the Archbishopric of Gniezno. It was a suffragan of the Archbishopric of Gniezno, the See independent of the German Archbishopric of Magdeburg, which had tried to lay claim to jurisdiction over the Polish church. The city quickly became a commercial centre and expanded rapidly to the neighbouring Wyspa Piaskowa (Sand Island) and then to the left bank of the Odra river. Hugo Weczerka writes that around 1000 the town had approximately 1000 inhabitants. An uprising in took place in 1037-1038 against the church and probably also against the bishop and the representatives of the Polish king, who were expelled. In 1038 the city fell to Bohemia and in 1054 it was regained by Poland. The Gesta principum Polonorum chronicle from the 1110s named Wrocław one of the three political centers of the Polish Kingdom alongside Kraków and Sandomierz. In 1138 it became the capital of the Piast-ruled Duchy of Silesia, which slowly detached from Poland. By 1139 two more settlements were built. One belonged to Governor Piotr Włostowic (a.k.a. Piotr Włast Dunin; ca. 1080–1153) and was situated near his residence on the Olbina by the St. Vincent's Benedictine Abbey. The other settlement was founded on the left bank of the Oder River, near the present seat of the university. It was located on the Via Regia that lead from Leipzig and Legnica and followed through Opole, and Kraków to Kievan Rus'. Polish, Bohemian, Jewish, Walloon and German communities existed in the city.

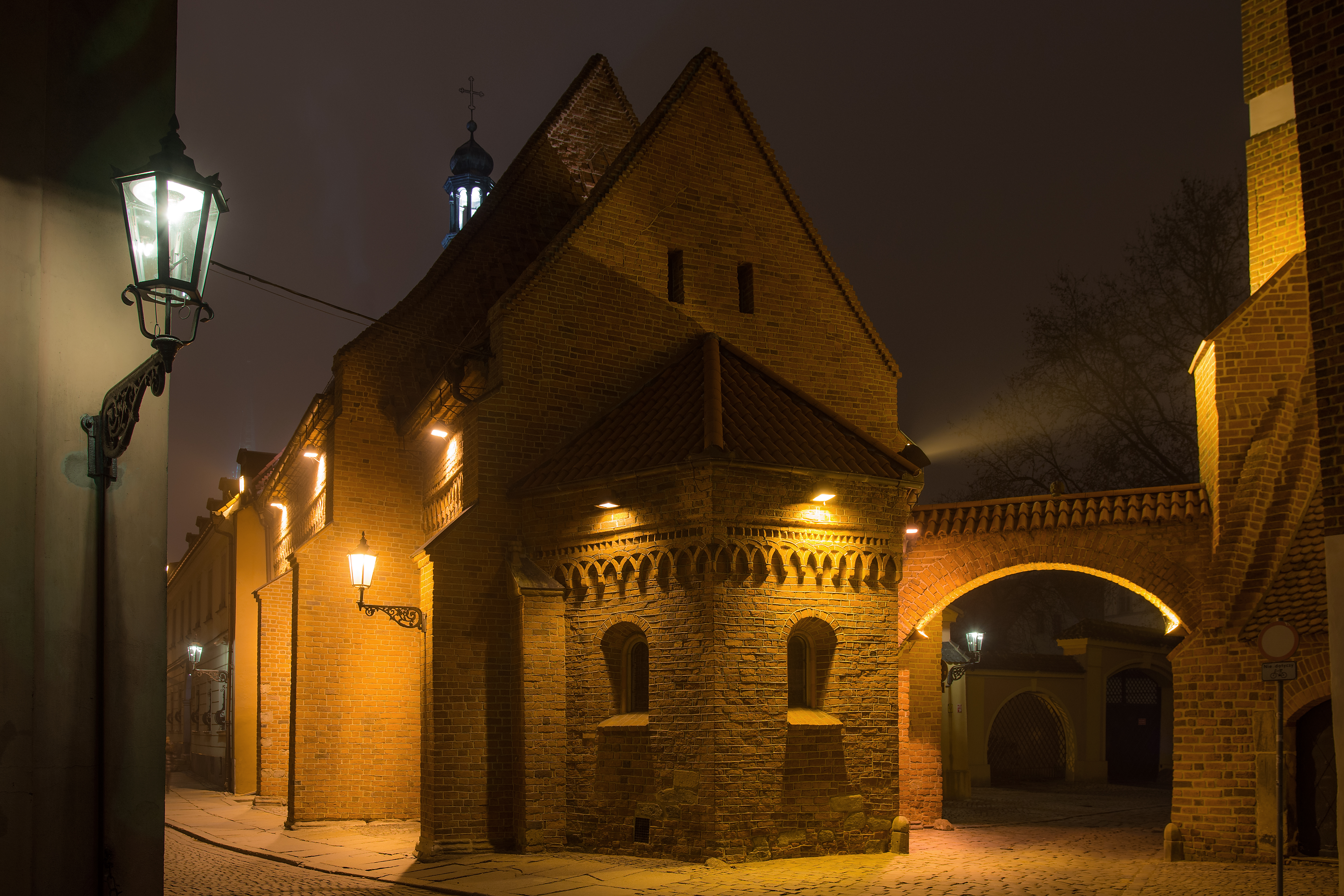
Romanesque St. Giles Church, the oldest unchanged building in Wrocław, built in the early 13th century in the Ostrów Tumski district

In the first half of the 13th-century duke Henry I the Bearded of the Silesian line of the Piast dynasty, managed to reunite much of the divided Polish kingdom. He became the duke of Kraków (Polonia Minor) in 1232, which gave him the title of the senior duke of Poland (see Testament of Bolesław III Krzywousty). Henry started striving for the Polish crown. His activity in this field was continued by his son and successor Henry II the Pious whose work towards this goal was halted by his sudden death in 1241 (Battle of Legnica). Polish territories acquired by the Silesian dukes in this period are called "The monarchy of the Silesian Henries". Wrocław was the centre of the divided Kingdom of Poland.

The city was devastated in 1241 during the first Mongol invasion of Poland. The inhabitants burned down their own city to force the Mongols to a quick withdrawal. The invasion, according to Norman Davies, led German historiography to portray the Mongol attack as an event which eradicated the Polish community. However, in light of historical research this is doubtful, as many Polish settlements remained, even in the 14th century, especially on the right bank of the Oder and Polish names such as Baran or Cebula appear including among Wrocław's ruling elite.

Burial sites of 13th-century Polish monarchs in Wrocław

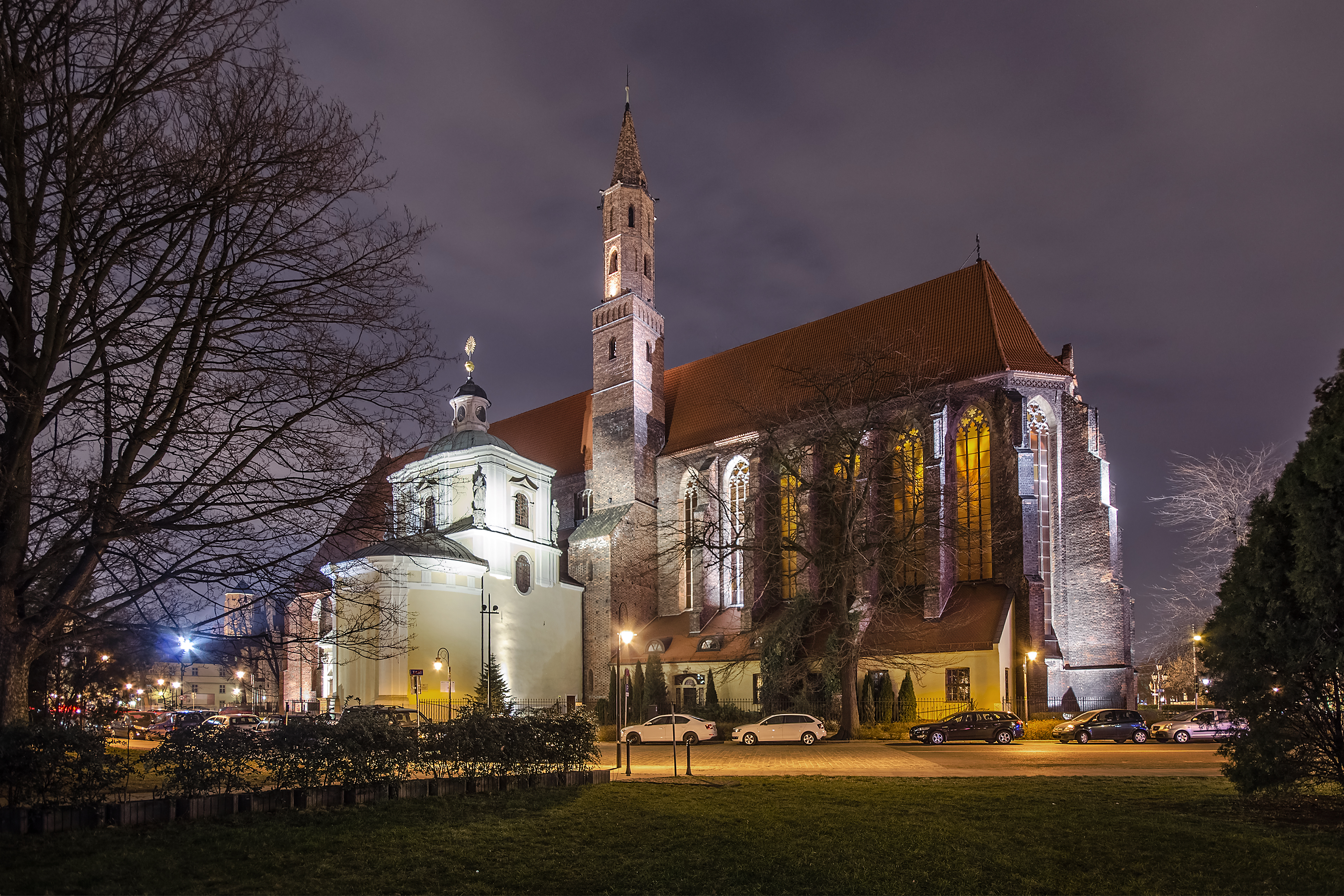
Saint Vincent church

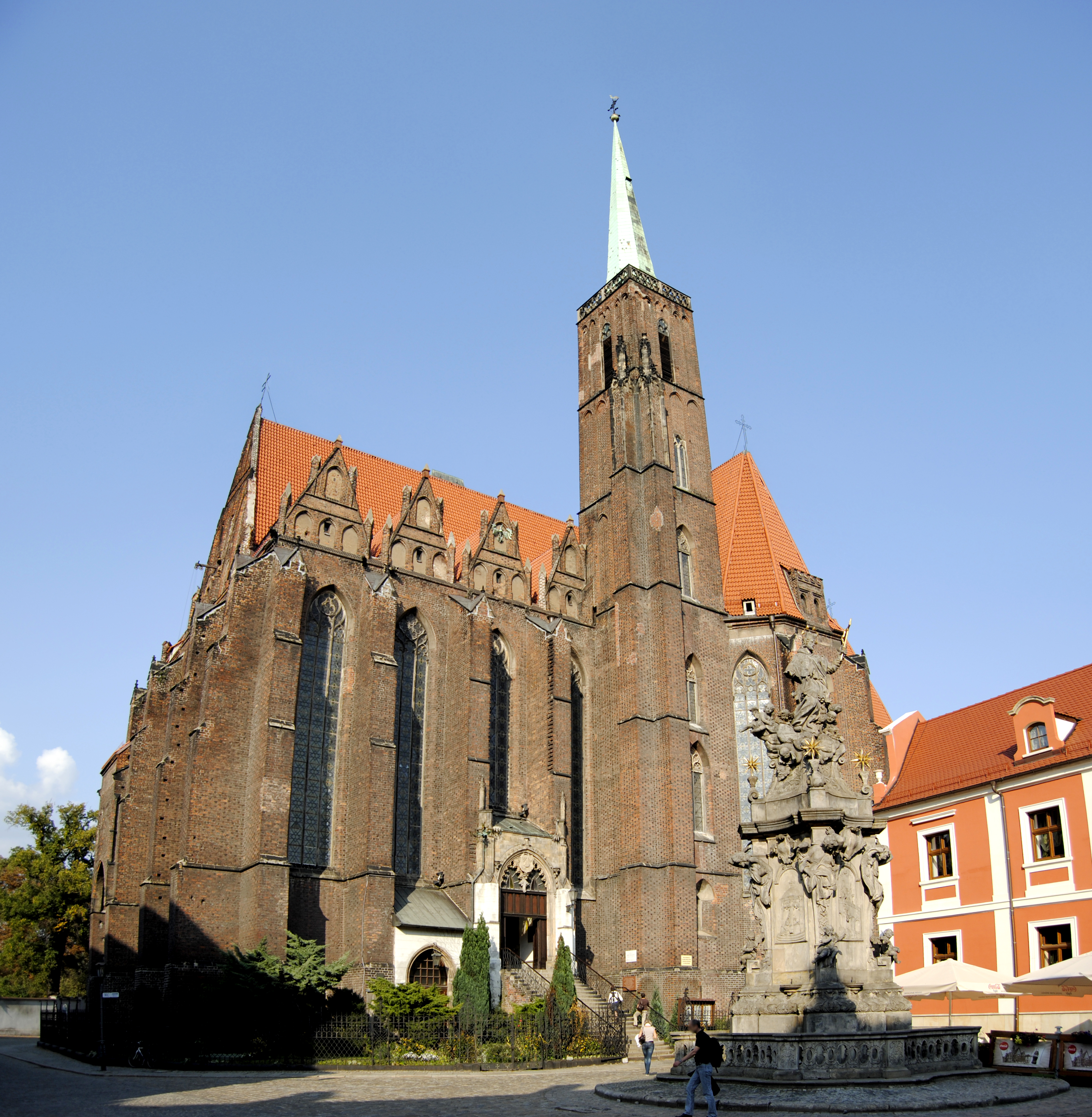
Holy Cross church

Georg Thum, Maciej Lagiewski, Halina Okolska and Piotr Oszczanowski write that the decimated population was replenished by many Germans. A different thesis is presented by Norman Davies who writes that it is wrong to portray people of that time as "Germans" as their identities were those of Saxons and Bavarians, while historian Norbert Conrads argues that a Polish identity didn't exist either, a view shared by Czech author František R. Kraus. Many of the German speaking Silesians were related to the Teutonic Knights from further north, Konigsberg. This includes the nobles who survived the Battle of Legnica in 1241. While Germanisation started, Norman Davies writes that "Vretslav was a multi-ethnic city in the Middle Ages. Its ethnic composition moved in an endless state of flux, changing with each political and cultural ebb and flow to which it was exposed". German author Georg Thum states that Breslau, the German name of the city, appeared for the first time in written records, and the city council from the beginning used only the Latin and German.

In 1245, in Wrocław, Franciscan friar Benedict of Poland, considered one of the first Polish explorers, joined Italian diplomat Giovanni da Pian del Carpine, on his journey to the seat of the Mongol Khan near Karakorum, the capital of the Mongol Empire. It was the first such journey by Europeans, and they returned with the letter from Güyük Khan to Pope Innocent IV.

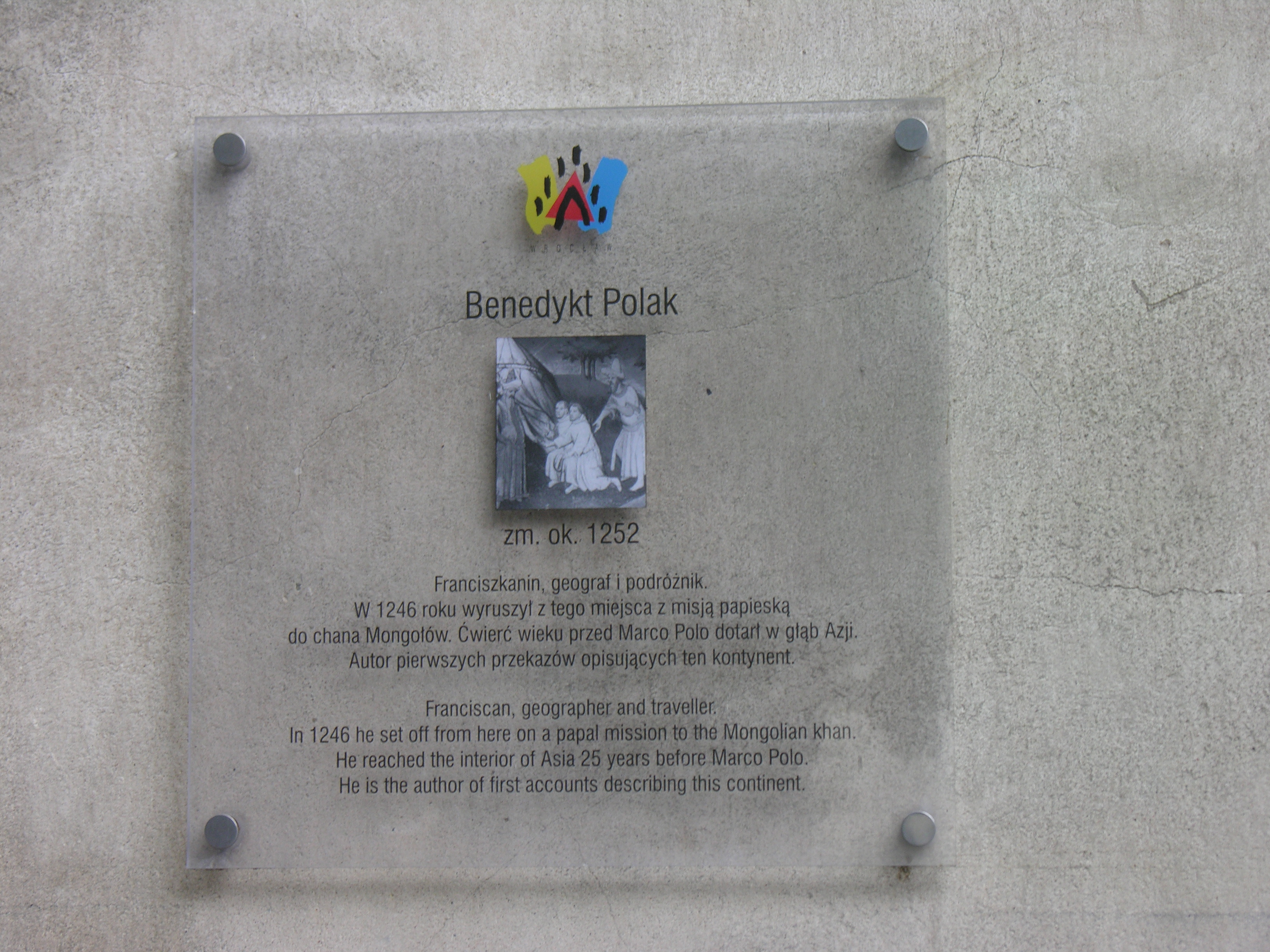
Memorial plaque to Benedict of Poland at the location from which he set out to the capital of the Mongol Empire

The rebuilt town adopted Magdeburg rights in 1262 and, at the end of the 13th century joined the Hanseatic League. The expanded town was around 60 hectares in size and the new Main Market Square (Rynek), which was covered with timber-framed houses, became the new centre of the town. The original foundation, Ostrów Tumski, was now the religious centre. In 1273, Piwnica Świdnicka, one of the oldest still operating restaurants in Europe, was opened. With the ongoing Ostsiedlung the Polish Piast dynasty dukes remained in control of the region, however, their influence declined continuously as the self-administration rights of the city council increased. German historian Norbert Conrads writes that they adopted the German language and culture and became Germanized in the 13th century. Wrocław – despite the beginnings of Germanization – remained in close union with the Polish church, and local Piasts remained active in Polish politics, while Polish was still used in the court as late as the 14th century. Rather, the Silesian Piasts had a carefully planned Germanization policy, whose aim was not necessarily to join the Holy Roman Empire.

The main source of the city's prosperity was trade between Poland and Ruthenia and Western Europe, and crafts also contributed to the city's wealth.

During much of the Middle Ages, Wrocław was ruled by Dukes of the Piast dynasty. In 1335 the last Piast Duke of Wrocław, Henry VI the Good, died. With the Treaty of Trentschin the city passed to John of Luxembourg, who fought a war with Casimir the Great over Silesia. John died while fighting in France and the war ended inconclusively. The issue was resolved only in 1372 by an agreement between Charles IV of Luxembourg and Louis I of Hungary; and while the city lost political ties to the Polish state, it remained connected to Poland by religious links and the existence of Polish population within it. Jan Długosz described the foreign rule over Wrocław as unlawful and expressed his hope that it would eventually return to Poland.

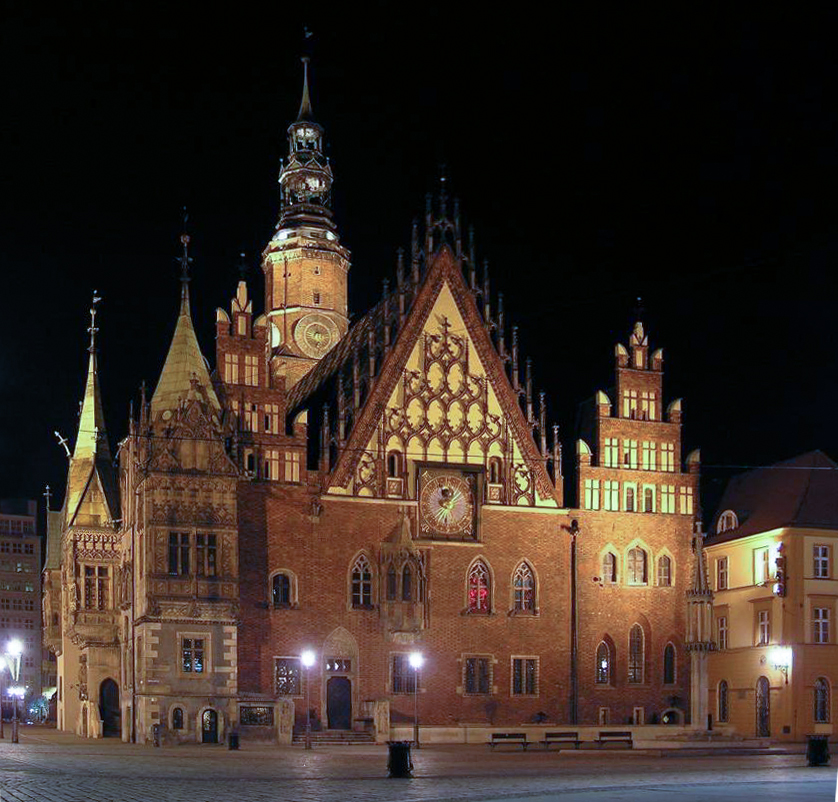
Wrocław historic City Hall built in a typical 13th-14th century Brick Gothic style

The bishops of Wrocław was known as the prince-bishops ever since Bishop Przecław of Pogorzela (1341–1376) bought the Duchy of Grodków from Duke Bolesław III the Generous and added it to the episcopal Duchy of Nysa, after which the Bishops of Wrocław had the titles of Prince of Nysa and Dukes of Grodków, taking precedence over the other Silesian rulers.

== Bohemia and Hungary ==
In 1348, the city was incorporated with almost the entirety of Silesia into the Lands of the Bohemian Crown, and a Landeshauptmann (Provincial governor) was appointed to administrate the region. Between 1342 and 1344 two fires destroyed large parts of the city. Despite the annexation by Bohemia, trade still took place mainly between Poland and Western Europe. In 1352 Bohemian King Charles IV, who was also elected King of Germany, visited the town. His successors Wenceslaus and Sigismund became involved in a long-lasting feud with the city and its magistrate, culminating in the revolt of the guilds in 1418 when local craftsmen killed seven councillors. In a tribunal two years later, when Sigismund was in town, 27 ringleaders were executed. He also called up for a Reichstag in the same year, which discussed the earlier happenings in the city.

In June 1466, in Wrocław, Polish diplomat Jan Długosz held a meeting with a papal legate, starting a peace process between Poland and the Teutonic Order, which a few months later culminated in the signing of the Second Peace of Thorn that ended the Thirteen Years' War, the longest of Polish–Teutonic wars.

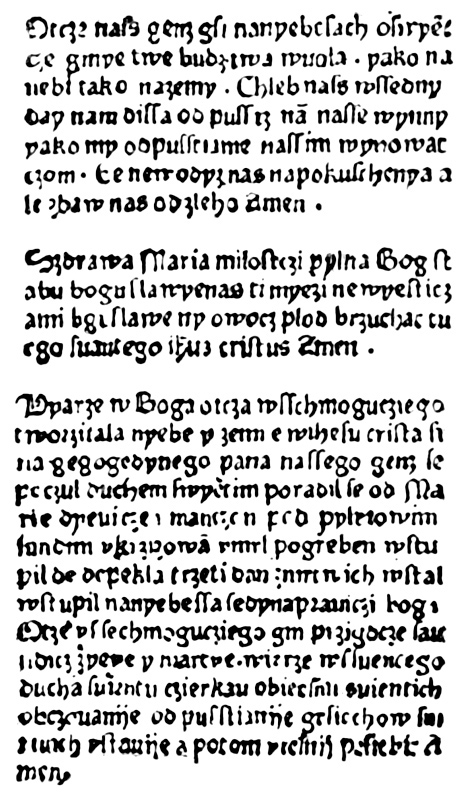
The oldest printed text in Polish in the Statuta synodalia episcoporum Wratislaviensium, printed in Wrocław by Kasper Elyan, 1475

When George of Poděbrady was elected king of Bohemia, the city opposed him since he was a Hussite and instead sided with his Catholic rival Matthias Corvinus. After the city fought alongside Corvinus against George in 1466, the local classes rendered homage to the king on 31 May 1469 in the city, where the king also met the daughter of mayor Krebs, Barbara, whom he took as his mistress. In 1474 the city was besieged by combined Polish-Bohemian forces, however in November 1474 Kings Casimir IV of Poland, his son Vladislaus II of Bohemia and Matthias Corvinus of Hungary met in the nearby village of Muchobór Wielki (present-day district of Wrocław) and in December 1474 a ceasefire was signed, according to which the city remained under Hungarian rule. Matthias Corvinus incorporated the city with Silesia in his dominion, which he controlled until his death in 1490. 1475 marks the beginning of movable type printing in the city and in Silesia, when Kasper Elyan opened his printing shop (Drukarnia Świętokrzyska). That same year he published the Statuta synodalia episcoporum Wratislaviensium, which contains the first-ever text printed in Polish. It was also the first ever printing in Silesia. The first illustration of the city was published in the Nuremberg Chronicle in 1493. Documents of that time referred to the town by many variants of the name including Wratislaw, Bresslau and Presslau.

From 1502 to 1538 renowned astronomer Nicolaus Copernicus was a scholaster of the Collegiate Church of the Holy Cross.

== Habsburg Monarchy ==
The ideas of the Protestant Reformation reached Breslau already in 1518, and in 1519 the writings of Luther, Eck and the opening of the Leipzig Disputation by Mosellanus were published by local printer Adam Dyon. In 1523 the town council unanimously, appointed Johann Heß as the new pastor of St. Maria Magdalena and thus introduced the Reformation in Breslau. In 1524 the town council issued a decree that obliged all clerics to the Protestant sermon and in 1525 another decree banned a number of Catholic customs. Breslau had become dominated by Protestants although a Catholic minority remained. Norman Davies states that as a city it was located on the borderline between Polish and German parts of Silesia, writing that "Vretslav lay astride the dividing line"; it also hosted a Czech community.

After the death of Louis II in the Battle of Mohács in 1526, the Habsburg monarchy of Austria inherited the Bohemian Crown with the city. In 1530 Ferdinand I awarded Breslau its current coat of arms. On 11 October 1609 German emperor Rudolf II granted the Letter of Majesty, which ensured the free exercise of church services for all Silesian Protestants. During Thirty Years' War the city suffered badly, was occupied by Saxon and Swedish troops and lost 18,000 of its 40,000 residents to plague.

The Counter-Reformation had started with Rudolf II and Martin Gerstmann, bishop of Breslau. One of his successors, bishop Charles of Austria, did not accept the letter of the majesty on his territory. At the same time, the emperor encouraged several Catholic orders to settle in Breslau. The Minorites came back in 1610, the Jesuits arrived in 1638, the Capuchins in 1669, the Franciscans in 1684 and the Ursulines in 1687. These orders undertook an unequalled amount of construction which shaped the appearance of the city until 1945. The Jesuits were the main representatives of the Counter-Reformation in Breslau and Silesia. Much more feared were the Liechtensteiner dragoons, which converted people by force and expelled those who refused. At the end of the Thirty Years' War, Breslau was only one of a few Silesian cities which stayed Protestant, and after the Treaty of Altranstädt of 1707 four churches were given back to the local Protestants.

During the Counter-Reformation, the intellectual life of the city, which was shaped by Protestantism and Humanism, flourished, as the Protestant bourgeoisie of the city lost its role as the patron of the arts to the Catholic orders. Breslau and Silesia, which possessed six of the 12 leading grammar schools in the Holy Roman Empire, became the centre of German Baroque literature. Poets such as Martin Opitz, Andreas Gryphius, Christian Hoffmann von Hoffmannswaldau, Daniel Casper von Lohenstein and Angelus Silesius formed the so-called First and Second Silesian school of poets which shaped the German literature of that time.

The dominance of the German population under the Habsburg rule in the city became more visible, while the Polish population diminished in numbers, although it did not disappear. Only a few families from the upper and middle classes celebrated their Polish roots, despite having Polish ancestors, and while the Polish population was reinforced by migrants and merchants, many of them became Germanized. Nevertheless, Poles continued to exist in the city, mostly living on the right bank of Oder river also known as "Polish side". The Polish community was led by such priests as Stanisław Bzowski or Michał Kusz, who fought for the continued existence of Polish schools in the city, and addressed their flock in Polish; Latin masses were interspersed with hymns and prayers in Polish.

In 1702 the Jesuit academy was founded by Leopold I and named after himself, the Leopoldine Academy.

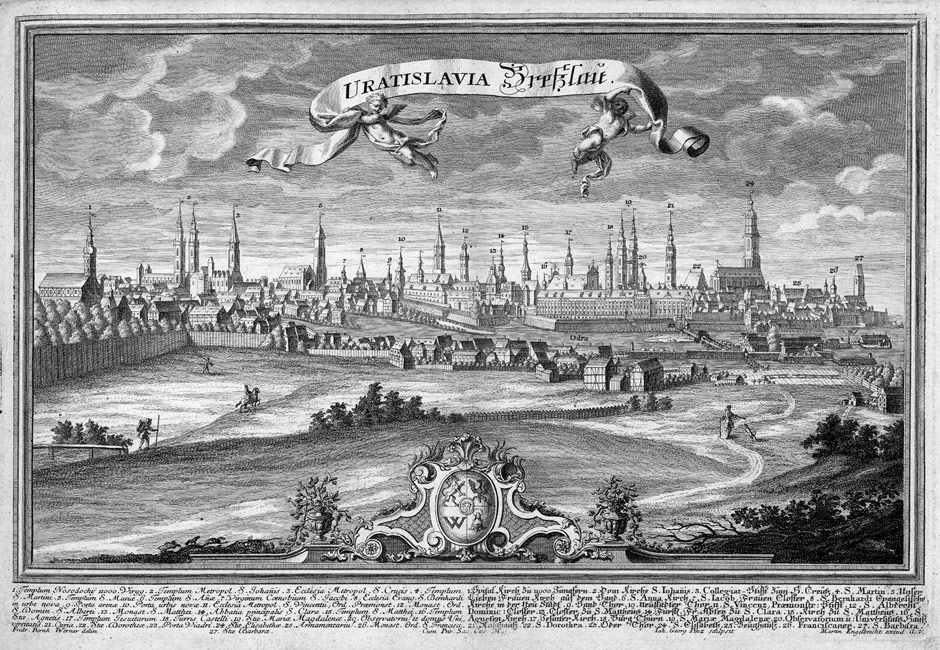
Breslau's City Towers in 1736

One of two main routes connecting Warsaw and Dresden ran through the city in the 18th century and Kings Augustus II the Strong and Augustus III of Poland often traveled that route.

== Prussia ==
During the War of the Austrian Succession in the 1740s, most of Silesia was annexed by the Kingdom of Prussia. Prussia's claims were derived from the agreement, rejected by the Habsburgs, between the Silesian Piast rulers of the duchy and the Hohenzollerns who secured the Prussian succession after the extinction of the Piasts. The Protestant citizenry didn't fight against the armies of Protestant Prussia and Frederick II of Prussia captured the city without a struggle in January 1741. In the following years, Prussian armies often stayed in the city during the winter month. After three wars Empress Maria Theresa renounced Silesia and Breslau in the Treaty of Hubertusburg in 1763.

The Protestants of the city could now express their faith without limitation, and the new Prussian authorities also allowed the establishment of a Jewish community.

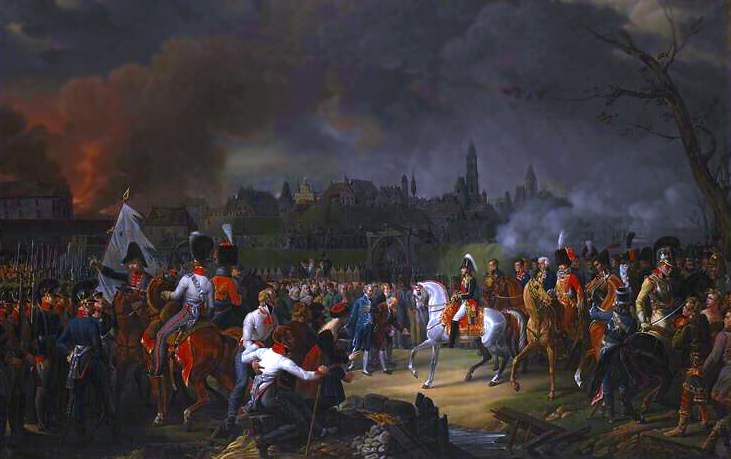
Entering the Duke Jerome Bonaparte to Breslau, 7 January 1807

After the demise of the Holy Roman Empire in 1806, Breslau was occupied by an army of the Confederation of the Rhine between 6 December 1806 to 7 January 1807. The Continental System disrupted trade almost completely. The fortifications of the city were levelled and almost every monastery and cloister secularized. The Protestant Viadrina university of Frankfurt (Oder) was relocated to Breslau in 1811, united with the local Catholic university of the Jesuits and formed the new Schlesische Friedrich-Wilhelm-Universität (Wrocław University).

In 1813 King Frederick William III of Prussia gave a speech in Breslau signalling Prussia's intent to join the Russian Empire against Napoleon during the Napoleonic Wars. He also donated the Iron Cross and issued the proclamation "An mein Volk" (to my people), summoning the Prussian people to war against the French. The city became the centre of the Liberation movement against Napoleon Bonaparte as volunteers from all over Germany gathered in Breslau, among them Theodor Körner, Friedrich Ludwig Jahn and Ludwig Adolf Wilhelm von Lützow, who set up his Lützow Free Corps in the city.

The city was an important center of the Polish secret resistance throughout the 19th century. There was a Polish-German student organization Silesia et Marchia Coniuncta in the city, which broke up in 1816. In 1817, Polish students founded the Polonia resistance organization. The members celebrated the Polish 3 May Constitution Day each year and wrote and distributed Polish political poems. In 1822, the Prussian police discovered the organization and carried out arrests of its members and searches of their homes. After the unsuccessful Polish November Uprising, the city was an important point of contact between partitioned Poland and the Great Emigration in Western Europe. It also remained an important center of Polish printing.

The Prussian reforms of Stein and Hardenberg led to a sustainable increase in prosperity in Silesia and Breslau. Due to the levelled fortifications, the city could grow beyond her old borders. Breslau became an important railway hub and a major industrial centre, notably of linen and cotton manufacture and the metal industry. Thanks to the unification of the Viadrina and Jesuit universities the city also became the biggest Prussian centre of sciences after Berlin, and the secularization laid the base for a rich museum landscape. In 1836 the Slavonic Literary Society was founded in the city by Czech scholar Jan Evangelista Purkyně with the assistance of Polish scholars Władysław Nehring and Wojciech Cybulski, its aim was to develop studies on Slavic languages and cultures; the Prussian authorities disbanded it in 1886 On 15 January 1841, the Chair of Slavistics was formed in the city, and headed by Professor František Čelakovský, it was the first institution of this kind in Germany

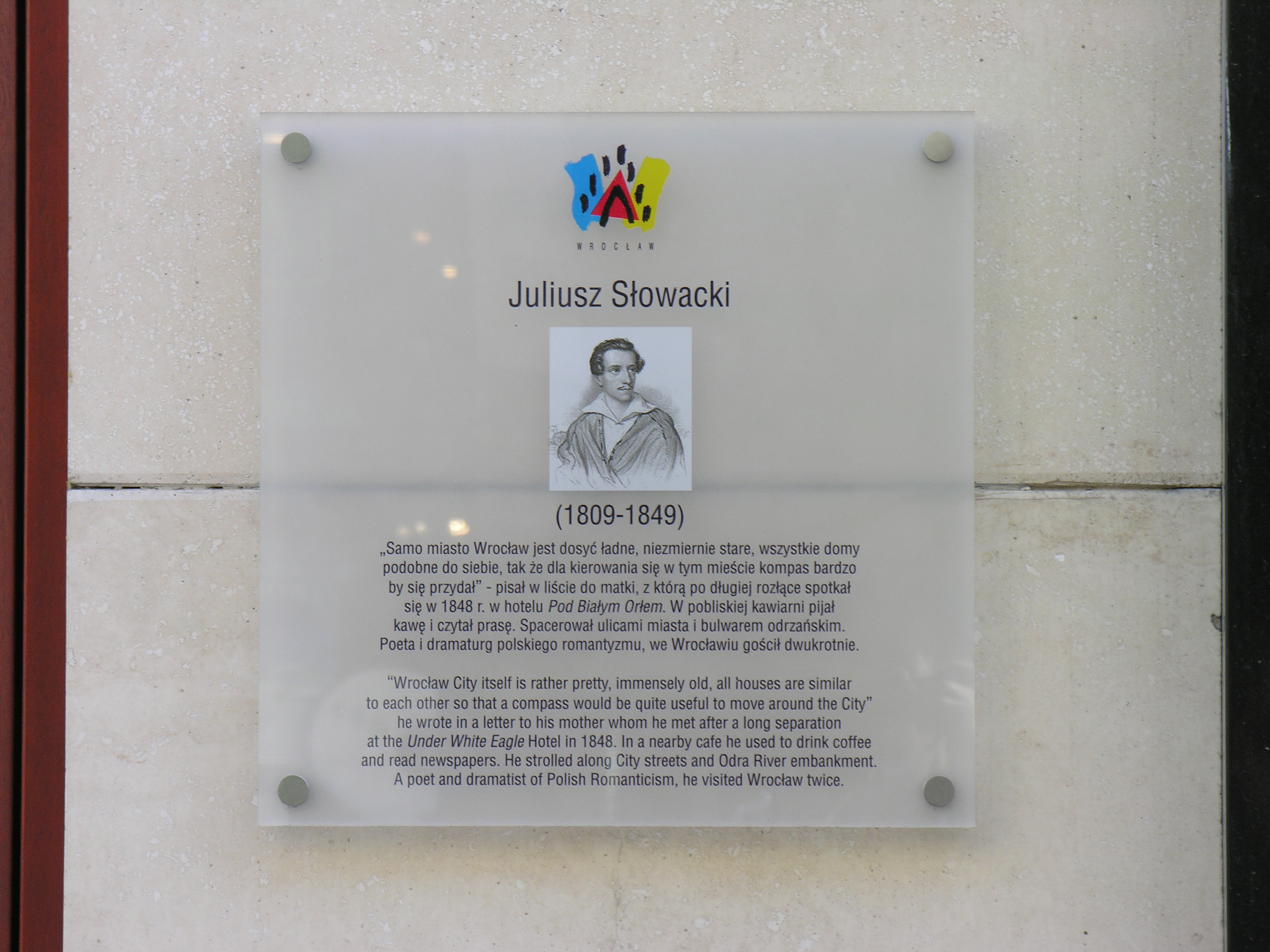
Plaque commemorating the stay of poet Juliusz Słowacki in the city in 1848

In the 1840s, a local branch of the secret Polish organization Związek Plebejuszy (transl. Union of Plebeians) was active. In 1848, many local Polish students joined the Greater Poland uprising against Prussia, and many Polish houses were decorated with Polish flags. On 5 May 1848, a convention of Polish activists from the Prussian and Austrian partitions of Poland was held in the city. Several days later, on 9 May, Polish national poet Juliusz Słowacki came to the city. In June, he met his mother there for the first time in nearly 20 years and the last time.

In 1854 the Jewish Theological Seminary was created, one of the first modern rabbi seminars in Europe. Its first director, Zecharias Frankel, was the principal founder of conservative Judaism.

The city was the seat of a Polish uprising committee before and during the January Uprising of 1863–1864 in the Russian Partition of Poland. Local Poles took part in Polish national mourning after the Russian massacre of Polish protesters in Warsaw in February 1861, and also organized several patriotic Polish church services throughout 1861. Secret Polish correspondence, weapons, and insurgents were transported through the city. After the outbreak of the uprising in 1863, the Prussian police carried out mass searches of Polish homes, especially those of Poles who had recently come to the city. The city's inhabitants, both Poles and Germans, excluding the German aristocracy, largely sympathized with the uprising, and some Germans even joined local Poles in their secret activities. In June 1863 the city was officially confirmed as the seat of secret Polish insurgent authorities. In January 1864, the Prussian police arrested a number of members of the Polish insurgent movement. The city was subjected to Germanisation policies, yet it retained a sizeable Polish population, especially among the poor.

== German Empire ==
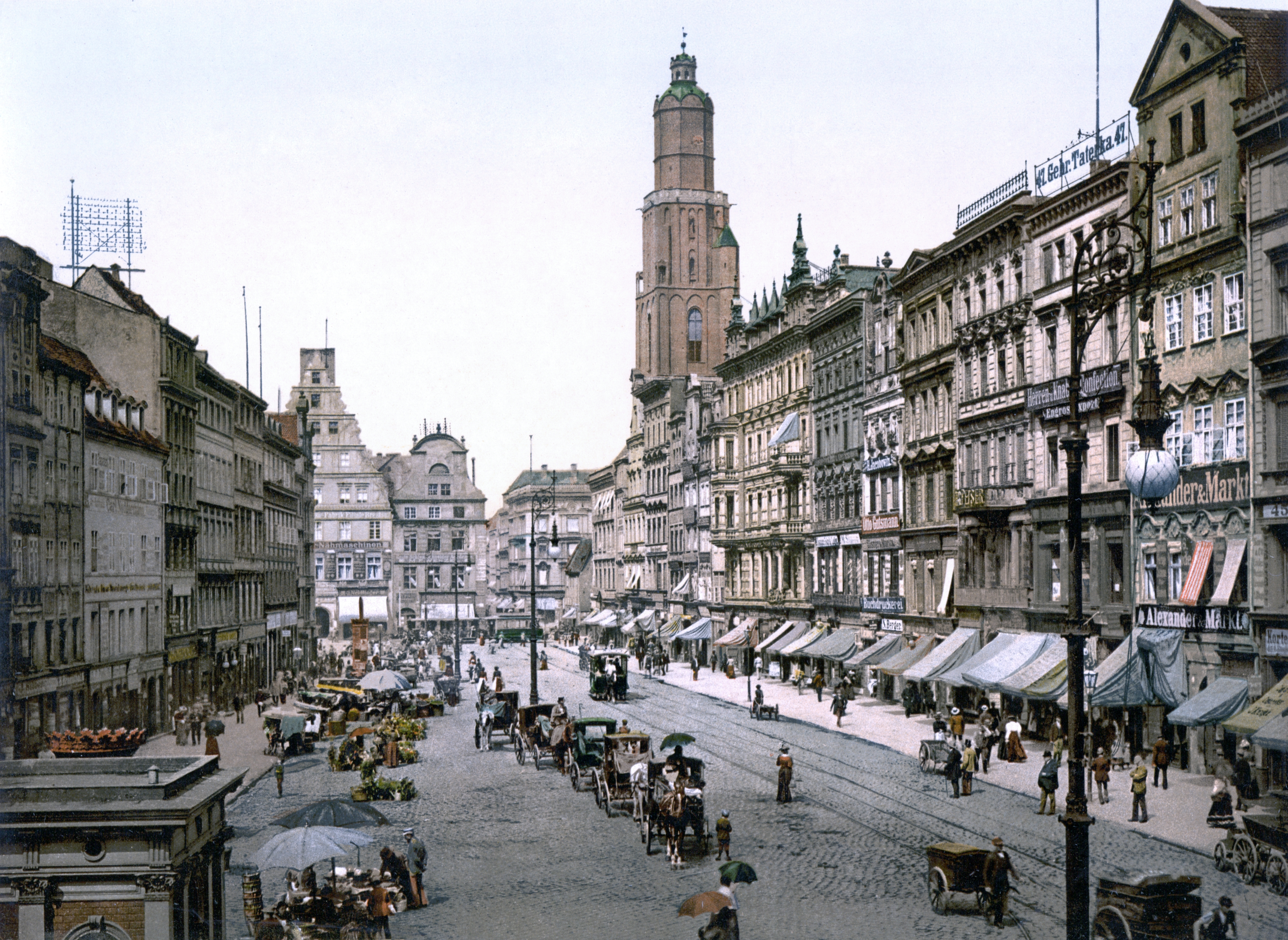
Town square and St. Elisabeth's Church

Breslau became part of the German Empire in 1871, which was established at Versailles in defeated France. The early years were characterized by rapid economic growth, the so-called Gründerzeit, although Breslau was hampered by protectionist policies of its natural markets in Austria-Hungary and Russia and had to turn to the German domestic market. Breslau's population grew from 208,000 in 1871 to 512,000 in 1910, yet the city was pushed down from being the third- to the seventh-biggest city in Germany. Among the population were the Polish and Jewish minorities.

The city spread out and incorporated outlying villages, like Kleinburg (Dworek) and Pöpelwitz (Popowice) in 1896, Herdain (Gaj) and Morgentau (Rakowiec) in 1904 and Gräbschen (Grabiszyn) in 1911. With the regulation of the Oder (Odra) modern garden suburbs like Leerbeutel (Zalesie) and Karlowitz (Karlowice) were built.

The official German census of 1905 listed 470,904 residents, thereof 20,536 Jews, 6,020 Poles and 3,752 others. Polish historians point to distortion of that number by German officials, and speak of several thousand more, or even 20,000 to 30,000 Poles living in it. Estimates however are difficult, since foreign residents were registered by citizenship rather than by nationality. Most of suburbs on right bank of Oder were Polish-speaking communities according to a source from 1874, and many photographs from this period indicate widespread use of Polish names;. As a frontier city on the edge of the Slavonic world, Breslau was more assertively German than other cities of the empire, and Breslau was less friendly to Poles, Czechs or unassimilated Jews than, for example, Berlin was. During his one-year tenure as rector of the university Felix Dahn for instance banned all Polish student associations.

Centennial Hall in Wrocław
UNESCO World Heritage Site
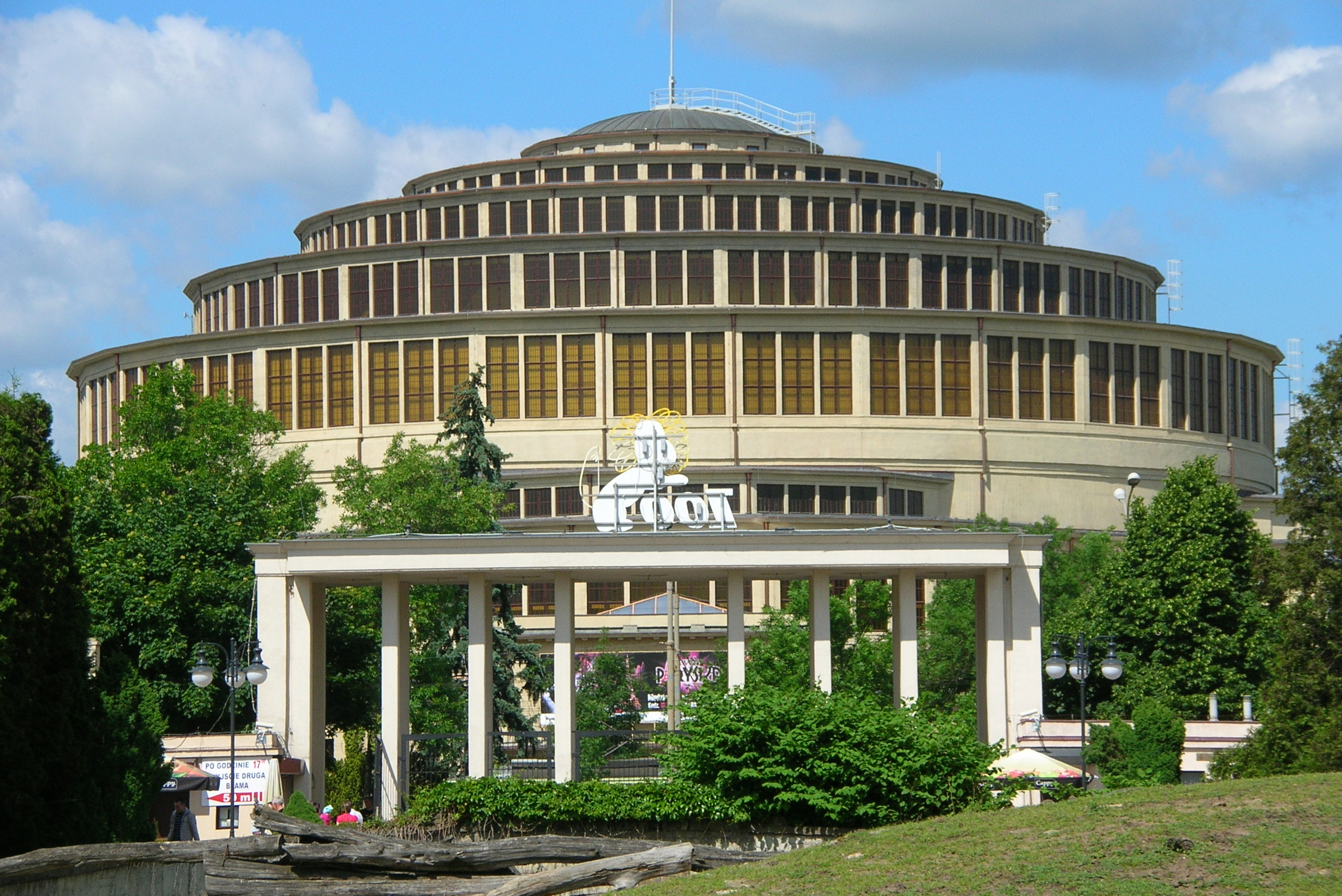
- The Hall.
- Interactive map of Centennial Hall in Wrocław
- Criteria: Cultural: (i)(ii)(iv)
- Reference: 1165
- Inscription: 2006 (30th Session)
- Area: 36.69 ha (90.7 acres)
- Buffer zone: 189.68 ha (468.7 acres)
- Coordinates: 51°6′25.01″N 17°4′37.25″E

Woodworking, brewing, textiles and agriculture, Breslau's traditional industries, flourished, and service and manufacturing sectors were established, which benefited from the nearby heavy industry of Upper Silesia. Linke-Hofmann, specialized in locomotives, became one of the city's largest employers and one of Europe's biggest manufacturers of railway carriages. By the end of the 19th century, Breslau threatened to eclipse Berlin, the capital of Prussia and the German Empire, as the financial centre of the country. The retail sector flourished too, represented by modern stores of Barasch, Molinari, Wertheim or Petersdorff. At the end of the German Empire Breslau had become the economic, cultural and administrative centre of Eastern Germany.

While Breslau itself was mostly Protestant the city also housed the Roman Catholic Diocese of Breslau, the second-largest diocese in the world, and thus became entangled in Bismarcks Kulturkampf. According to Norman Davies, the city had a population divided among 63% Protestants, 32% Catholics and 5% Jews. Although the open conflict between Breslau's Protestant majority and Catholics was avoided, public resentment was notable, most notably in the affairs of the numerous student corporations. Meanwhile, Breslau became the focus of the Old Lutheran Church. In 1883 the Old Lutheran Theological Seminar was opened, which attracted numerous scholars, among them Rudolf Rocholl. By 1905 the community already had 75 pastors and 52,000 members.

The German Jewry of Breslau formed the Einheitsgemeinde (united community) of Orthodox and Reform Jews and thus narrowing the gap between both schools. In 1872 Reform Rabbi Joel and his Orthodox counterpart Gedaliah Tiktin jointly consecrated Breslau's New Synagogue. From 14,000 in 1871 the Jewish community grew to 20,000 in 1910, thus becoming the third-largest in Germany. Breslau's confident, vibrant and assimilated community, with countless social, charitable, cultural and educational organisations, became a model for others. The first Jewish students' fraternity in the German Empire, the Viadrina, was created in 1886 in Breslau. Polish student organisations included Concordia, Polonia, and a branch of the Sokół movement.

While most of Silesia's greats of the 19th century, such as Gustav Freytag, Adolph Menzel or Willibald Alexis, had to leave Silesia to get recognized, the cultural exodus was stopped by the 1890s. In a few decades, Breslau was turned into a cultural centre of international notability. The old Art Academy moved into a bigger home and attracted artists like painter Max Wislicenus, sculptor Theodor von Gosen and future Nobel Prize winner Gerhard Hauptmann. The architectural section of the academy rose to prominence under the directorship of Hans Poelzig, who contributed greatly, along with Max Berg, to the Neues Bauen movement, and Breslau gained fame as a centre of modernist architecture.

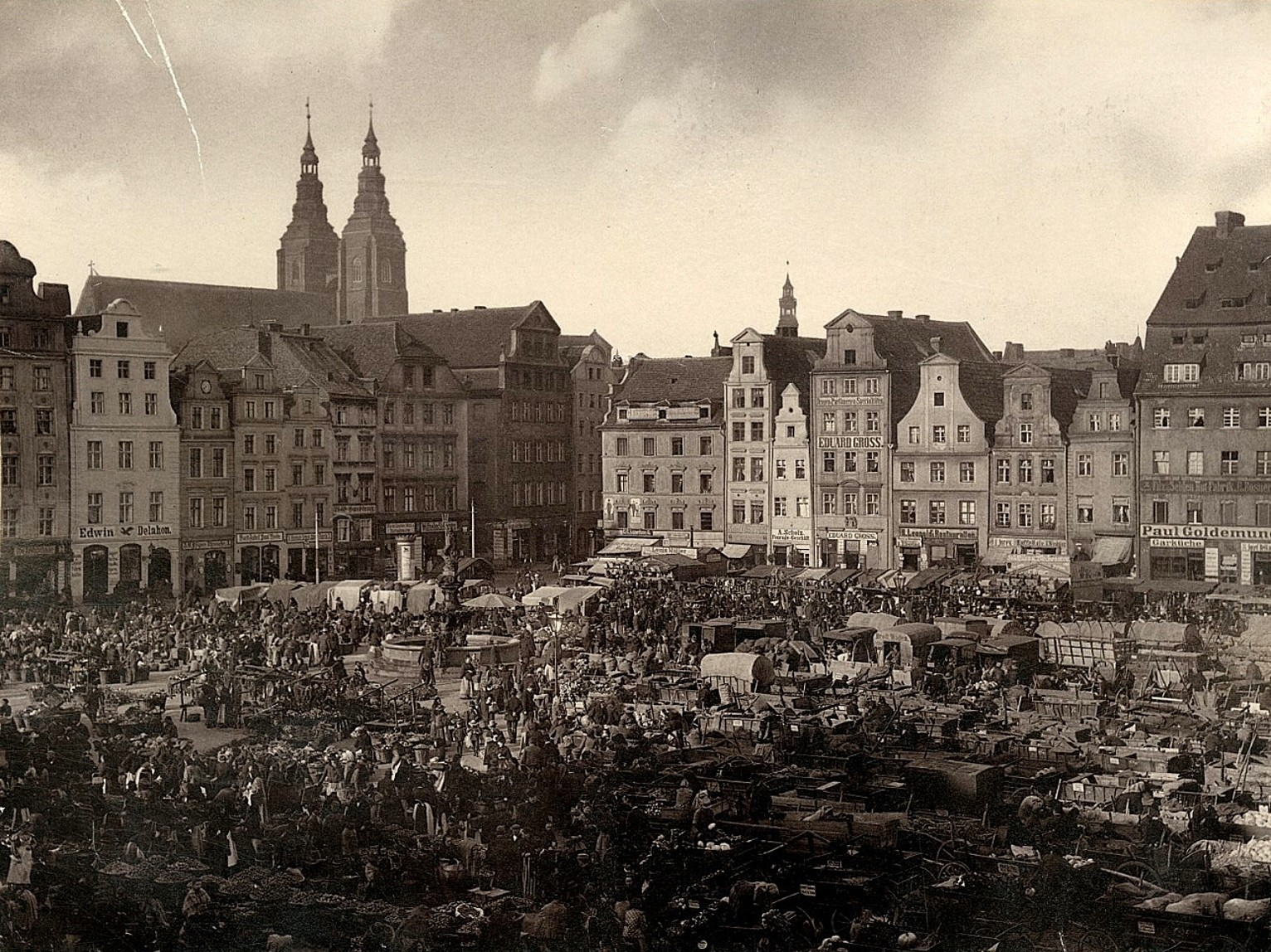
New Market Square in the 1890s

Performing arts in the city received a notable boost too. In 1861 the Orchestral Society (Orchesterverein) was founded, which achieved a good reputation in 1880 when Max Bruch was conductor of the orchestra, and later the Polish musician Rafał Ludwik Maszkowski, who conducted the orchestra till his death in 1901; he along with other Polish artists like Wanda Landowska, Józef Śliwiński, Bronisław Huberman and Władysław Żeleński performed Polish-themed plays as part of the repertoire of the Orchesterverein. The Opera house (Stadttheater), which was reopened in 1871 after two fires, attracted artists like Leo Slezak and Wilhelm Furtwängler. Johannes Brahms paid tribute to the city when he composed the Akademische Festovertüre, Op. 80 upon receiving an honorary doctorate in 1879.

Modern science flourished in the city, with a wide array of achievements in almost every department. During the German Empire, Breslau's scientists received four Nobel Prizes (plus two in literature). Above all, medical sciences were the flagship of academic research, where Breslau not only presented new theories but also new disciplines. Ferdinand Cohn, the director of the Institute of Plant Physiology, is considered a pioneer of bacteriology, while Albert Neisser, director of the Dermatology Clinic, discovered gonorrhoea, and Alois Alzheimer, professor at the university, discovered the Alzheimer disease.

In the 1890s Breslau developed into a centre of Social Democracy in Germany. With one exception at least one member of the Silesian SPD was sent to the Reichstag in Berlin, among them several prominent socialists like Eduard Bernstein, the former secretary of Friedrich Engels.

With the outbreak of World War I, Breslau's VI. Army Corps was sent to the western front to form the pivot of the Schlieffen plan, while the 1st Leibkürassiere saw action at the battle of the Marne before they were moved to the Eastern Front. The end of Germany's western offensive and the absence of the VI. Army Corps left Silesia and Breslau dangerously exposed. In 1914/15 the Russian army stopped only 80 km to the east of Breslau, which led to the evacuation of children and the erection of barbed-wire defenses. The Silesian Landwehr under General Remus von Woyrsch was rapidly deployed to face the Russian army, but German victories at the Masurian lakes and Gorlice soon eliminated this threat.

During World War I, in 1914, a branch of the Organizacja Pomocy Legionom ("Legion Assistance Organization") operated in the city with the goal of gaining support and recruiting volunteers for the Polish Legion. The city was visited several times by Polish Legions envoys from the Austrian Partition of Poland. Three envoys were arrested by the Germans in November 1914 and deported to Austria, and the organization soon ended its activities in the city. During the war, the German government operated seven forced labour camps for Allied prisoners of war in the city.

The population in the city suffered badly during the war. Food was rationed, and prices for potatoes or eggs skyrocketed by more than 200%, resulting in food riots. The "Turnip Winter" of 1916/17 left many on the verge of starvation. Food hoarding was decreed with capital punishment in the city. After four years of war, Breslau's trade had fallen by 66 per cent. More than 8,000 people died of tuberculosis, and the population dropped from 540,000 to 472,000.

The end of World War I was followed by civil unrest and revolution in Germany. The garrison in Breslau mutinied in November, liberated convicts from jail, among them Rosa Luxemburg, looted shops and seized the offices of the Schlesische Zeitung, Breslau's biggest newspaper. When Emperor Wilhelm II left the country the German Empire dissolved.

== Weimar Republic ==
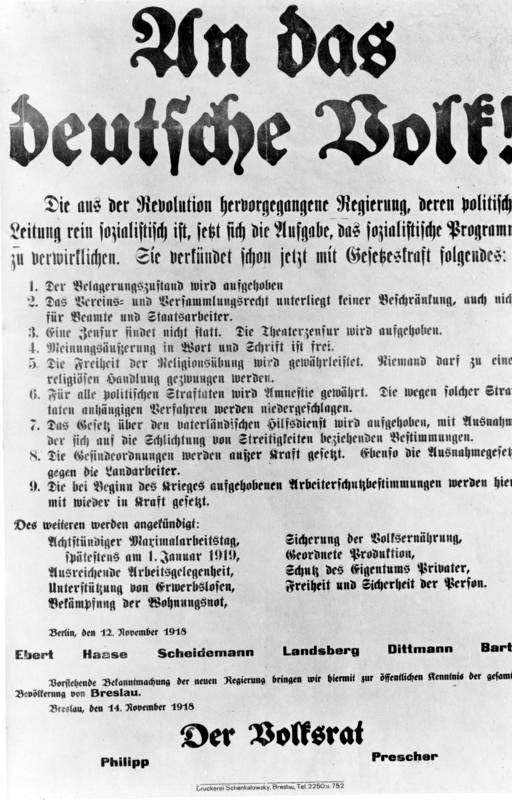
Announcement of the Socialist provisional government, Breslau 14 November 1918

The end of the German Empire led to workers' and soldiers' councils taking over civilian and military power across Germany with little or no opposition from the former imperial authorities. In Breslau, too, the authorities were deposed without larger tumults. When Lord Mayor Paul Mattig and Archbishop Bertram, among others, called for a continuance of public duty and ordered General Pfeil of the VI Army Corps to release all political prisoners, Pfeil ordered his soldiers to leave the barracks and, as his last military order, allowed a demonstration of Social Democrats in the Jahrhunderthalle. One day later, soldiers' councils in the army and the Committee of Public Safety were formed. On the same day, a Volksrat (people's council) of Social Democrats, Liberals, the Catholic Centre Party and trade unions was founded, led by Social Democrat Paul Löbe. As relations between the Volksrat and Löbe's opponents were mostly consensual, the revolution in Breslau was peaceful.

Despite the largely peaceful transition, Breslau faced several challenges which radicalized the political landscape of the city. Social conditions got worse as 170,000 soldiers and displaced persons were expected to return, with only 47,000 available quarters. The prospect of a Communist government was a major fear. The loss of nearby Greater Poland to re-established Poland, the prospect of further losses in Upper Silesia and the transformation of neighbouring Bohemia into a new state called Czechoslovakia spread anxiety among the people, who saw their city turn into an advance post of Germany. The number of Poles in the city dropped from an already low 4–5.000 to 0.5 per cent 20 years later.

Riots of the Spartacists in February resulted in the death of five protesters and injured nineteen. A month later the Freikorps revolted, and Silesia was one of several eastern provinces in which the Kapp Putsch received solid backing. The commander of the military district supported the coup d'état and four Freikorps units peacefully took over large parts of the city. The governor of Silesia, Breslau's Chief of Police and the SPD President of Breslau were immediately purged. Kapp's government, however, collapsed after a week and the Freikorps in Breslau withdrew, killing 18 people and wounding many others. Anti-Semitic propaganda, moreover, culminated in the murder of Bernhard Schottländer, the Jewish editor of the Schlesische Arbeiter-Zeitung. Jewish stores and hotels were attacked by mobs in the city.

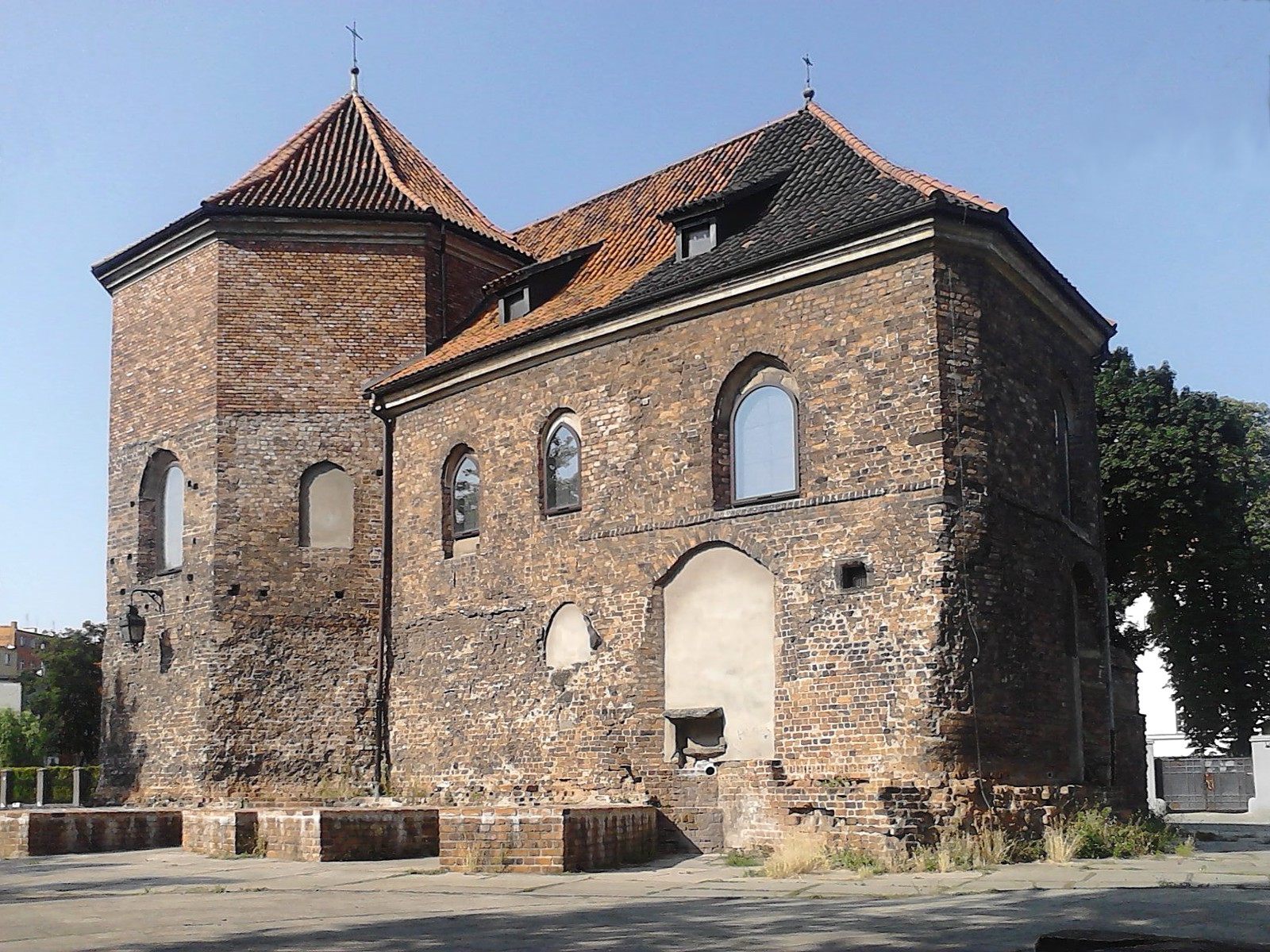
Church of St. Martin became one of the focal points of social life of the Polish population in the interwar period

After First World War the Polish community started having masses in Polish in the Churches of Saint Ann and since 1921 in St. Martin Church; the Polish consulate was opened on the Main Square, additionally, a Polish School was formed by Helena Adamczewska. Soon after tensions around the Upper Silesian plebiscite sparked violence in Breslau, where widespread rioting was mostly directed against the Inter-Allied Plebiscite Commission, especially the French, but also the Polish. The buildings of the Polish consulate and school were demolished and Polish library was burned along with several thousand volumes Problems culminated however in 1923. Hyperinflation ruined many people, and strikes and walk-outs swept all over Germany. 50 large shops in the commercial centre were looted in the city when partly anti-Semitic, riots broke out on 22 July, and six looters were killed.

In 1919, Breslau became the capital of the newly created Province of Lower Silesia, and its first head of government (German: Oberpräsident) was social democrat Felix Philipp. The Social Democrats also won the Lower Silesian elections of 1921 with 51.19%, followed by the Catholic centre with 20.2%, DVP with 11.9%, DDP with 9.5% and the Communists with 3.6%.

The mid-1920s brought political stability, mostly due to the leadership of Gustav Stresemann. In 1 Election result in Lower Silesia and Breslau showed a solid Socialist majority in 1924 and 1928. In 1925 the Silesian NSDAP was founded, the party however garnered only 1 per cent of the votes in 1928, well below the national average of 2,8 per cent.

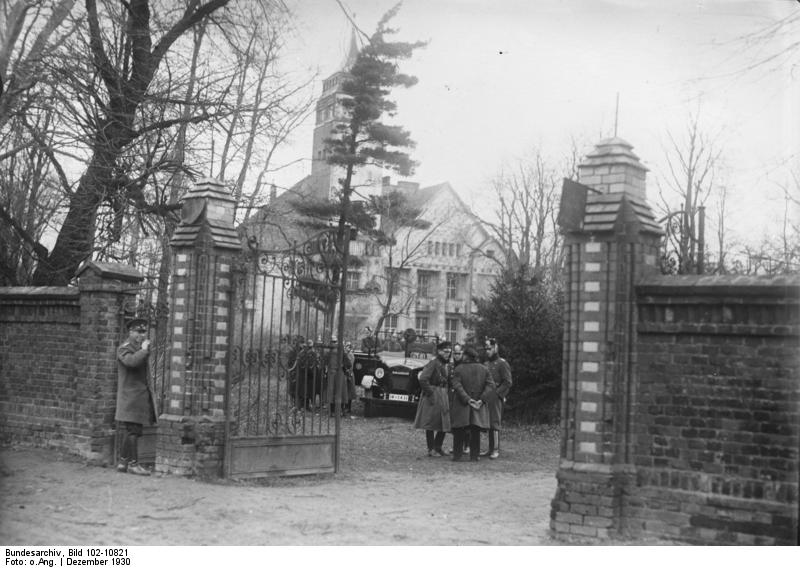
Arrest of 200 National Socialists in Jäschkowitz, 15 km to the south of Breslau, 1930

After the incorporation of 54 communes between 1925 and 1930, the city expanded to 175 km^{2} and housed 600,000 people. Between 26 and 29 June 1930 it hosted the Deutsche Kampfspiele, a sporting event for German athletes after Germany was excluded from the Olympic Games after World War I.

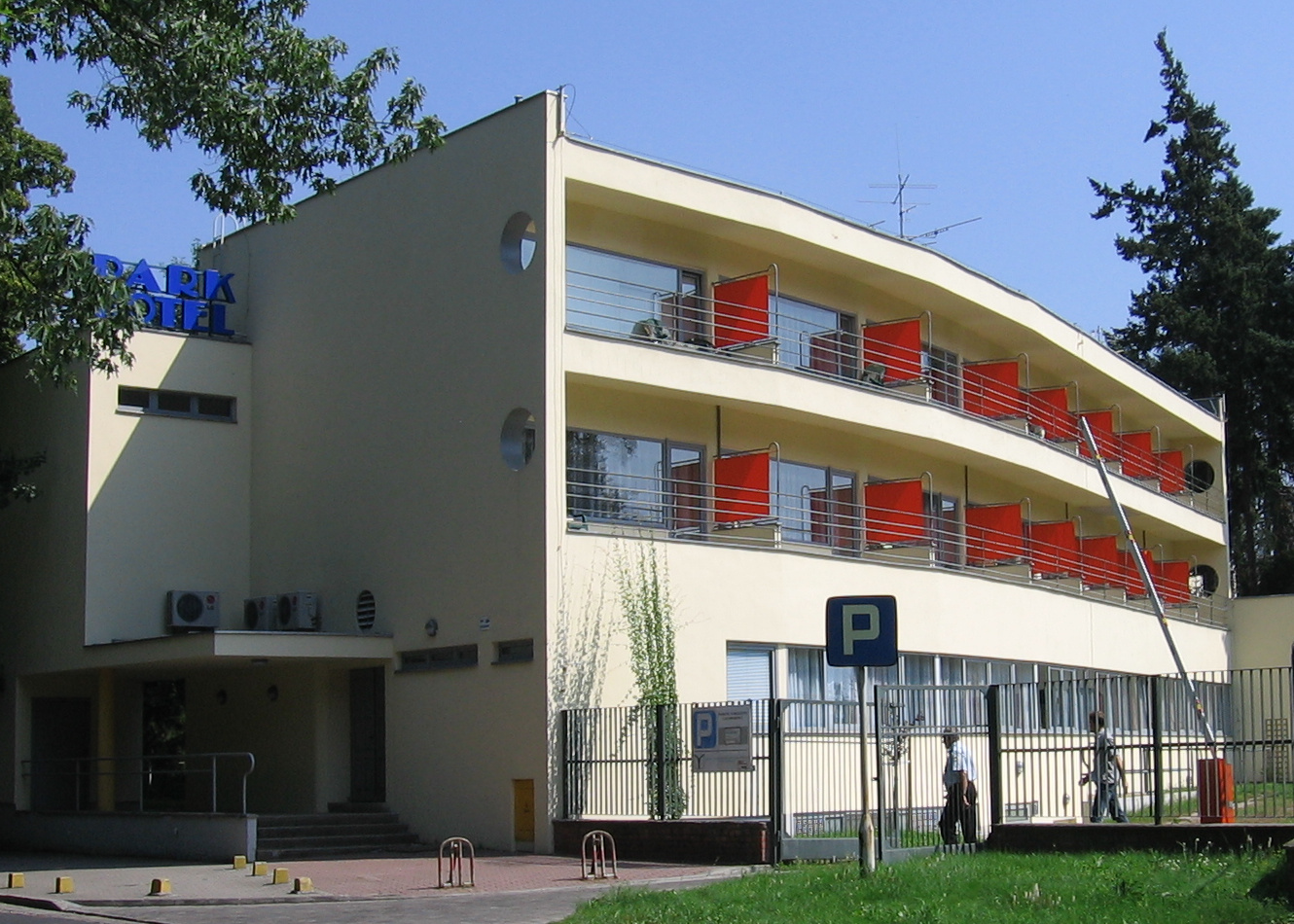
Wohnungs-und Werkraumausstellung (WuWa), a building designed by Hans Scharoun, today Park Hotel

This peaceful period ended with the Wall Street Crash and the following collapse of the German economy. Unemployment rose from 1.3 million in September 1929 to 6 million (1/3 of the working population) in 1933; in Breslau from 6,672 persons in 1925 to 23,978 in 1929, the worst figures in Germany after Chemnitz. The number of families living on welfare support was more than twice as high as in Leipzig or Dresden. Public faith in democratic institutions faded and anti-democratic parties – Communists and Nazis – gained support. The battles of both were played out all over Germany, also in Breslau. In May–June 1931, the annual rally of the Stahlhelm, marked by violent rhetoric and irredentist claims towards Poland and Lithuania, took place in the city. Communist counter-manifestations were dispersed by German police. The violence in the city spiralled in the summer of 1932. On 23 June a column of SA men was attacked by Communists, with eleven seriously injured, followed by a killed Socialist three days later. On 6 August grenades were thrown during battles between Nazis and Communists. In July 1932 Hitler spoke in Breslau, attracting 16,000 listeners. In the following elections, his party received 43% of the Breslau vote, the third-highest result in Germany. On 30 January 1933, he was appointed Chancellor of Germany.

Despite all turbulences, the cultural scene in the Weimar Republic and in Breslau flourished. The reorganized Academy of Arts reached its creative height under the directorship of Oskar Moll and can be considered a predecessor of the first Bauhaus. Many Bauhaus artists, among them Oskar Schlemmer and Georg Muche, taught in Breslau, while several lecturers and students of the academy became leading protagonists of the main artistic trends in the Weimar Republic, like Alexander Kanoldt, who was co-founder of the Munich New Secession and became one of the stars of the Neue Sachlichkeit, or Hans Scharoun, an important exponent of Organic architecture. In 1929 the Werkbund opened WuWa (German: Wohnungs-und Werkraumausstellung) in Breslau-Scheitnig, an international showcase of modern architecture by architects of the Silesian branch of the Werkbund.

During the inter-war years, the city was also the centre of the Polish national movement radiating towards other groups of Poles in Lower Silesia; it focused on Polish cultural life and organisational efforts.

== Nazi period and World War II ==
The city became one of the largest support bases of the NSDAP movement, and in the 1932 elections the Nazi party received 43.5% of votes, achieving the third biggest victory in Weimar Germany A reason for the strong NSDAP support may have been that Breslau was the city among the eight largest cities of Germany with the highest rate of unemployment, which the Nazi party promised to tackle.

Before the Holocaust, Breslau was home to the fourth-largest Jewish community in Germany. In 1933 the Gestapo began actions against Jewish and Polish students in the city who were issued special segregationist ID documents like those of Communists, Social Democrats, trade unionists, and other people deemed threats to the state. Laws against Jews came into power, limiting their involvement in all spheres of life. People were arrested and beaten for using Polish in public. The Polish cultural centre (the Polish House) in Breslau was destroyed by the police. In 1938 The New Synagogue, along with many Jewish-owned businesses and properties were destroyed during the Kristallnacht, and many of the city's 23,240 Jews were deported to pre-war Nazi concentration camps; those who remained were also murdered by the Nazi in the Holocaust. In June 1939, Polish students were expelled from the university.

The city's coat of arms was changed by the Nazis in 1938, as it contained the letter W in reference to its original name, and thus was considered "too Slavic" Additionally 88 locations in the city received new German names as part of the campaign of Germanization

During the invasion of Poland, which started World War II, in September 1939, the Germans carried out mass arrests of local Polish activists and banned Polish organizations. Polish church services were abolished, with the last Polish service held in the Saint Martin church on 17 September 1939. The city became the headquarters of the southern district of the Selbstschutz, which task was to commit atrocities against Poles. Most of the Polish elites also left during the 1920s and 1930s while Polish leaders who remained were sent to concentration camps. During the war, 363 Czech and 293 Polish prisoners, as well as resistance members from Western Europe, were executed by guillotine in the city's prison. In total, the German regime killed 896 people in this way. In 1941 the remaining pre-war Polish minority in the city, as well as Polish slave labourers organised a resistance group called Olimp. In 1942 additional Polish resistance groups were reported to be in existence in the city, "Jaszczurka", Siła Zbrojna Polski and Polska Organizacja Polityczna The Germans sent the bodies of some of the Poles murdered in Poznań to the anatomy department of the local university.

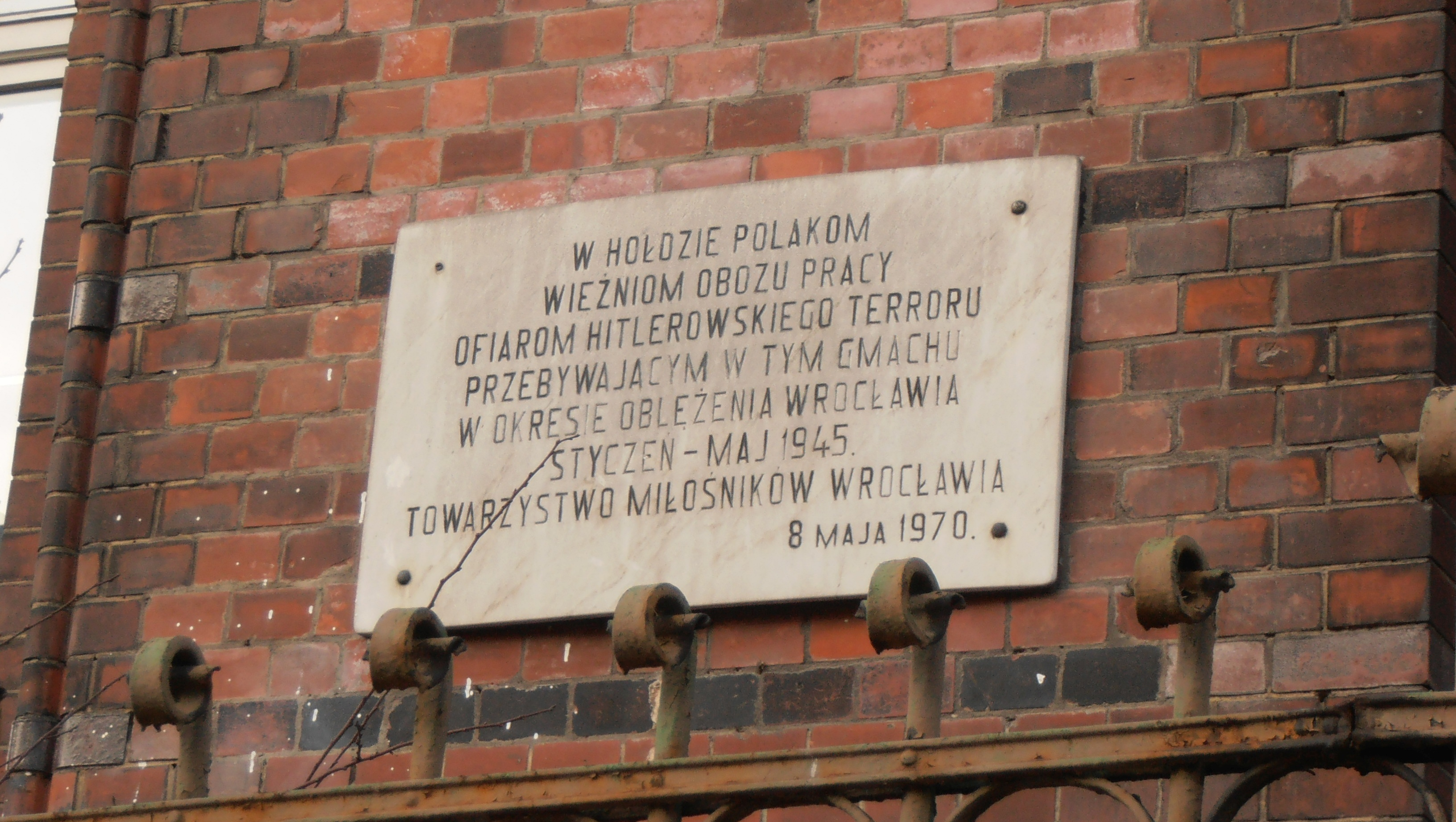
Memorial plaque to Polish forced laborers under Germany in Wrocław

In addition, a network of concentration camps and forced labour camps, or Arbeitslager, was established in the district around Breslau, to serve the city's growing industrial concerns, including FAMO, Junkers and Krupp. The total number of prisoners held at such camps exceeded many tens of thousands. Official Nazi estimates reported 43,950 forced labourers in 1943 and 51,548 in 1944, most of them being Poles. At the end of 1944 between 30,000 and 60,000 captured Poles were sent to Breslau after the defeat of Warsaw Uprising. There were four subcamps of the Gross-Rosen concentration camp in the city, in which Nazi Germany imprisoned about 3,400-3,800 men of various nationalities, including Poles, Russians, Italians, Frenchmen, Ukrainians, Czechs, Belgians, Yugoslavs, Chinese, and about 1,500 Jewish women. Many of the prisoners died, and the remaining were evacuated to the main camp of Gross-Rosen in January 1945. The German government also operated three subcamps of the Stalag VIII-B/344 prisoner-of-war camp, and two Nazi prisons, including a youth prison, both with multiple forced labour subcamps. In 1945, the Germans also established an AGSSt assembly center for Allied POWs in the city.

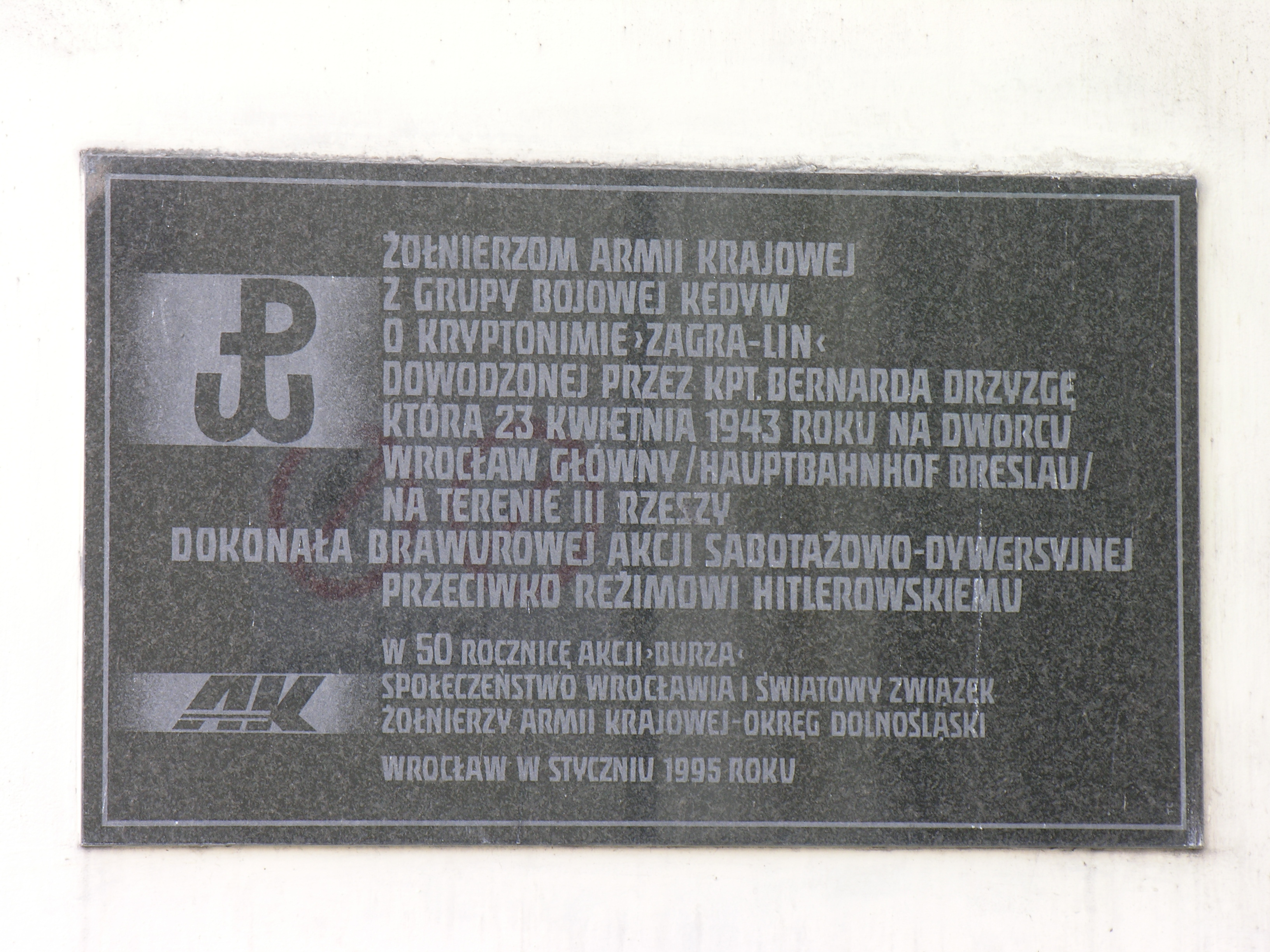
Commemorative plate honouring bombing of the main railway station in 1943 by Polish resistance in the city, placed in 1995

Throughout most of World War II Breslau was not close to the fighting. The city became a haven for refugees, swelling in population to nearly one million. Polish resistance from the group Zagra-Lin successfully attacked a Nazi German troop transport on the main railway station in the city on 23 April 1943, and a commemorative plate honouring their actions was placed after Nazi Germany was defeated in 1945. In February 1945 the Soviet Red Army approached the city. Gauleiter Karl Hanke declared the city a Festung (fortress), i.e. a stronghold to be held at all costs. Concentration camp prisoners were forced to help build new fortifications (see Arbeitseinsatz). In one area, the workers were ordered to construct a military airfield intended for use in resupplying the fortress, while the entire residential district along the Kaiserstraße (now Plac Grunwaldzki) was razed. The authorities threatened to shoot anyone who refused to do their assigned labour. Eyewitnesses estimated that some 13,000 died under enemy fire on the airfield alone. In the end, one of the few planes that ever used it was that of the fleeing Gauleiter Hanke.

After the encirclement of the city by the Red Army, members of the resistance succeeded in making contact with the Russians. In March 1945, twelve Nazi party offices were destroyed, killing 30 Nazi members.

Hanke finally lifted a ban on the evacuation of women and children, when it was almost too late. During his poorly organised evacuation in January and February 1945, around 18,000 people froze to death, mostly children and babies, in icy snowstorms and −20 °C weather. Some 200,000 civilians, less than a third of the pre-war population, remained in the city because the railway connections to the west were damaged or overloaded.

By the end of the Siege of Breslau, 50% of the old town, 90% of the western and southern and 10–30% of the northern and northeastern quarters of the city had been destroyed. 40,000 inhabitants, including forced labourers, lay dead in the ruins of homes and factories. After a siege of nearly three months, "Fortress Breslau" surrendered on 7 May 1945. It was one of the last major cities in Germany to fall.

== Modern Poland ==
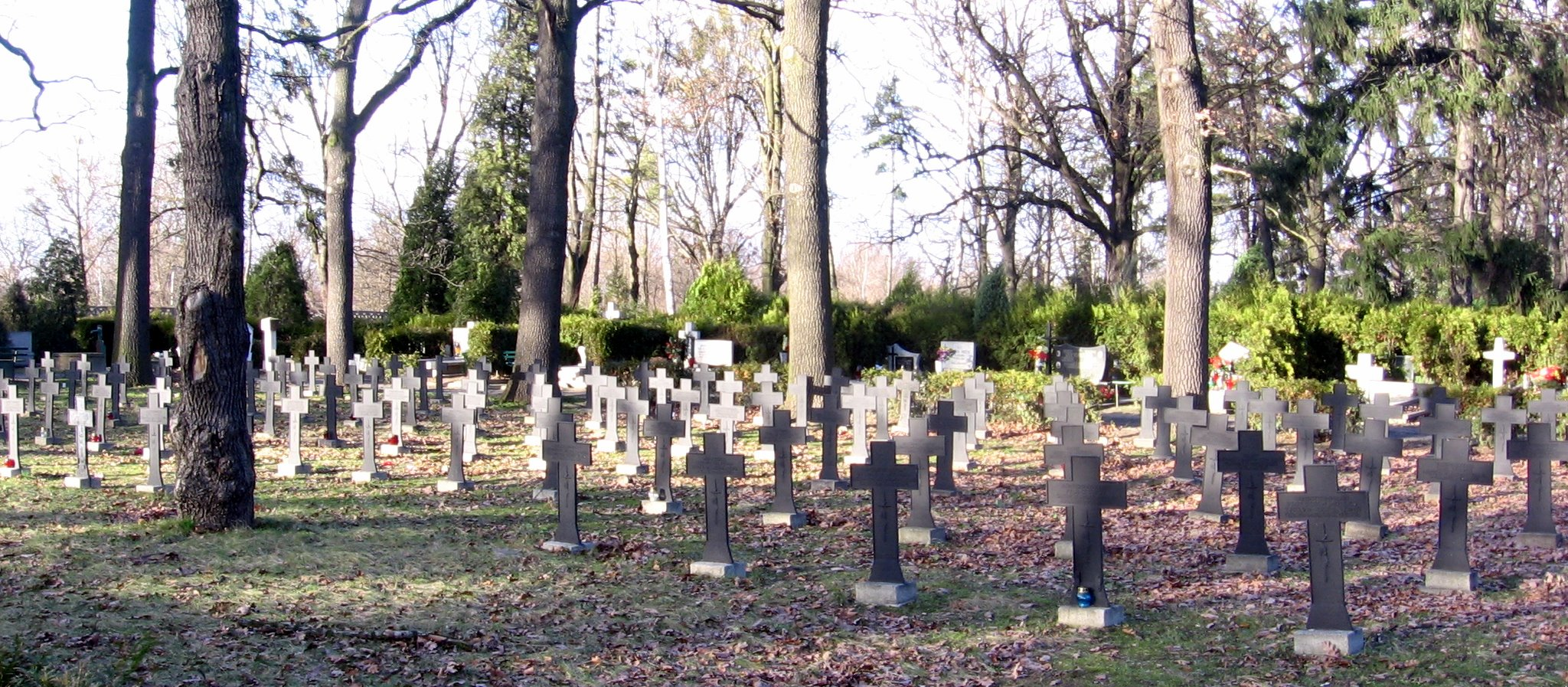
Preserved part of Osobowice cemetery with Russian, Serbian and German graves

=== People's Republic of Poland ===
Along with almost all of Lower Silesia, post-war Wrocław became part of Poland under the terms of the Potsdam Conference, pending a final peace conference with Germany.

The town became the biggest city of the so-called Recovered Territories. On 24 May 1945, the surviving members of the Polish pre-war minority from the Nazi German genocide in Wrocław were met by Polish authorities. Bolesław Drobner, the city's newly appointed mayor, welcomed them in "Free Poland" and urged pre-war Poles from Wrocław to stay in the city, expressing his view that the Polish state needs people like them to awake to life after the war; many of the addressed heeded this call, and pre-war Poles became active members of Wrocław's political and cultural life, forming an association called "Klub Ludzi ze znakiem P" ("People with the P sign"), remembering those Poles who perished under Nazi German rule in the city.

Franciszek Juszczak, a long-time leader of the Polish community in Wrocław before World War II and resistance member, was nominated by Drobner to the position of vice-president of the Lower Silesian Chamber of Crafts In close cooperation with authorities he formed Związek Polaków Byłych Obywateli Niemieckich (Union of Former German Citizen Poles). The pre-war Polish minority, though officially regarded as heroes, was subject of a "verification process" to determine their Polishness, in a procedure described as an "experience of some unpleasantness". According to German historian Gregor Thum, in 1949, only 2,769 people, or about 1 percent of the city's population were pre-war inhabitants of the city, with 1,029 of them able to speak Polish fluently.

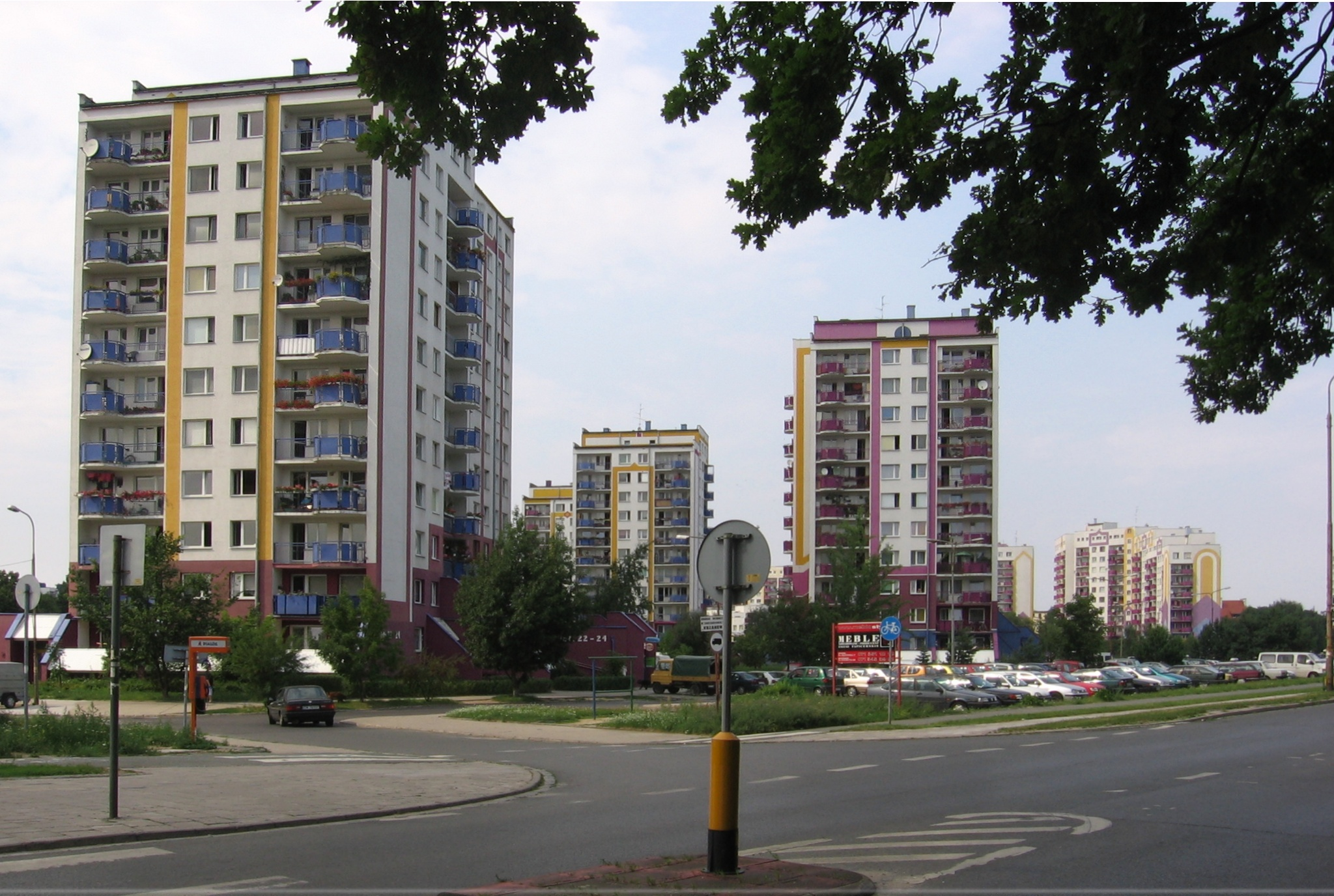
Kozanów tower blocks

In the summer of 1945, the city had a predominantly German population who were expelled in accordance with the Potsdam Agreement to one of the two post-war German states between 1945 and 1949. However, as was the case with other Lower Silesian cities, a considerable German presence remained in Wrocław until the late 1950s; the city's last German school closed in 1963. The population of Wrocław was soon increased by the resettlement of Poles forming part of postwar repatriation of Poles (1944–1946) (75%) as well as the forced deportations from Polish lands annexed by the Soviet Union in the east (25%) including from cities such as Lwów (now Lviv, Ukraine), Stanisławów (now Ivano-Frankivsk, Ukraine), Wilno (now Vilnius, Lithuania), and Grodno (now Hrodna, Belarus). In the 1950s Greeks, refugees of the Greek Civil War, also settled in the city.

After the destruction during the Siege of Breslau, the city was further destroyed by vandalism, fire, and the razing and dismantling of factories, and material assets by the Soviet Union. The economic potential of the city was decreased to 40% of the prewar situation. Wroclaw was further weakened by the so-called Szaber, which transferred goods to Central Poland, and the campaign "bricks for Warsaw" by the Polish government ten years later, which provided reconstruction material for the levelled Old Town of the Polish capital. This loss of historic structures was irreversible and the consequences are still visible today.

The rebuilding of the town was characterized by a mix of polonization and degermanization, which led to reconstruction and destruction. Gothic architecture was painstakingly restored, while testimonies of later eras were often neglected or destroyed. For example, even as late as in the 1970s, Stucco elements from the Baroque were chiseled off in some of the town's churches according to the ideologically enforced return to the allegedly original Piast state. The process of degermanization also included the removal and destruction of almost all German non-religious monuments, and the elimination of inscriptions, even centuries-old epitaphs and in churches. Between 1970 and 1972 all non-Jewish German cemeteries were destroyed.

Tower blocks were massively constructed both in the city and around it, e.g. Kozanów housing estate.

In 1964, the Monument to the Lwów Professors massacred by the Germans in 1941, was unveiled.

In 1973, city limits were greatly expanded by including the settlements of Jarnołtów, Jerzmanowo, Osiniec, Strachowice, Kłokoczyce, Lipa Piotrowska, Marszowice, Mokra, Polanowice, Rędzin, Świniary, Widawa and Żar as new neighborhoods.

=== After the fall of communism ===
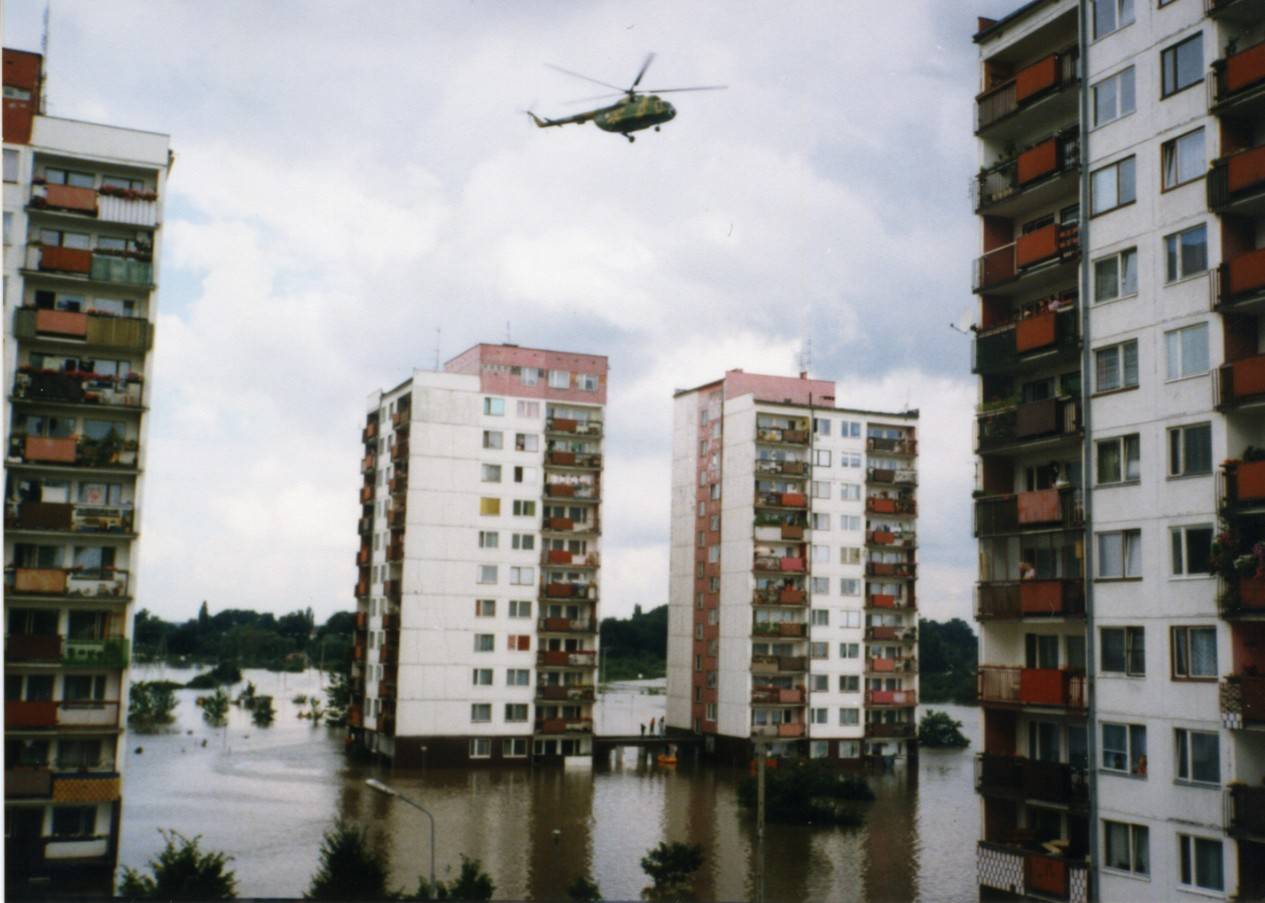
1997 Central European flood in Wrocław

In 1994, the Old Town of Wrocław was designated a Historic Monument of Poland.

In May 1997 Wrocław was visited by Pope John Paul II. In July 1997, the city was heavily affected by a flood of the Oder River, the worst flooding in post-war Poland, Germany, and the Czech Republic. Around one-third of the city's area stood underwater. An earlier equally devastating flood of the river took place in 1903. After the flood big areas of the city were renovated, including Main Market Square with the Town Hall and the Wrocław Palace.

In 2016, Wrocław was designated the World Book Capital and European Capital of Culture.

In recent history, Wrocław has co-hosted various international sports competitions, including the EuroBasket 2009, UEFA Euro 2012, 2014 FIVB Volleyball Men's World Championship, 2016 European Men's Handball Championship and 2017 World Games.

In September 2024, the Marszowice, Stabłowice and Złotniki neighborhoods in the western part of the city were partially flooded during the 2024 Central European floods, however, for the most part, houses and apartment blocks were spared thanks to anti-flood embankments built in the meantime.

== Historical populations ==
Year	1800	1831	1850	1852	1880	1900	1910	1925	1933	1939
Inhabitants	64,500	89,500	114,000	121,100	272,900	422,700	510,000	555,200	625,198	629,565
Year	1946	1956	1960	1967	1970	1975	1980	1990	1999	2009
Inhabitants	171,000	400,000	431,800	487,700	526,000	579,900	617,700	640,577	650,000	632,240

== See also ==
- Jewish art collectors in Breslau
- Timeline of Wrocław history
- History of Wrocław after 1945

== Bibliography ==
=== English ===
- Davies, Norman; Roger Moorhouse (2002). Microcosm: Portrait of a Central European City. London: Jonathan Cape. ISBN 978-0-224-06243-5.
- Thum, Gregor (2011). Uprooted: How Breslau Became Wroclaw During the Century of Expulsions. Princeton University Press. ISBN 978-0-691-14024-7.
- Barnstone, Deborah Ascher (2016). Beyond the Bauhaus: Cultural Modernity in Breslau, 1918–33. Social History, Popular Culture, and Politics in Germany. University of Michigan Press. ISBN 978-0-472-11990-5.

=== Polish ===
- Dawna Polonia wrocławska Alicja Zawisza Towarzystwo Miłośników Wrocławia, 1984
- Harasimowicz, Jan (2001). Włodzimierz Suleja (ed.). Encyklopedia Wrocławia. Wrocław: Wydawnictwo Dolnośląskie. ISBN 978-83-7384-561-9.
- Historia Wrocławia w datach, Marek Cetwiński, Romuald Gelles
- Historia Wrocławia: Od twierdzy fryderycjańskiej do twierdzy hitlerowskiej Cezary Buśko, Włodzimierz Suleja, Teresa Kulak.
- Kulak, Teresa (2006). Wrocław. Przewodnik historyczny (A to Polska właśnie). Wrocław: Wydawnictwo Dolnośląskie. ISBN 978-83-7384-472-8.
- Pater, Mieczysław (1976). "Polska poezja okolicznościowo-rewolucyjna we Wrocławiu (1812–1822)". Śląski Kwartalnik Historyczny Sobótka (in Polish). XXXI (2). Wrocław: Zakład Narodowy im. Ossolińskich, Wydawnictwo Polskiej Akademii Nauk.
- Pater, Mieczysław (1963). "Wrocławskie echa powstania styczniowego". Śląski Kwartalnik Historyczny Sobótka (in Polish). XVIII (4). Wrocław: Zakład Narodowy im. Ossolińskich.
- Polacy na studiach lekarskich we Wrocławiu w latach 1811-1918 Jan Smereka, Zakład Narodowy im. Ossolińskich, 1979
- Sławni Polacy we Wrocławiu w XIX wieku: informator : [wystawa], Muzeum Historyczne we Wrocławiu Oficyna "Gryf", 1987
- Studenci Polacy na Uniwersytecie Wrocławskim w latach, 1918-1939: katalog zachowanych archiwaliów, Alicja Zawisza, Schlesische Friedrich-Wilhelms-Universität zu Breslau, Breslau. Uniwersytet 1972
- Wrocław w liczbach 2000 (PDF) (in Polish). Wrocław: Urząd Statystyczny we Wrocławiu. 1999. ISBN 83-911967-7-1. Archived (PDF) from the original on 29 August 2020 – via Śląska Biblioteka Cyfrowa.

=== German ===
- Breslauer Urkundenbuch – complete collection of all deeds of the city (in German and Latin)
- Codex Diplomaticus Silesiae T.11 Breslauer Stadtbuch – liber civitatis (town book) of Wroclaw, containing the councilmen since 1287 and documents regarding the constitutional history (in German and Latin)
- Codex Diplomaticus Silesiae T.3: Henricus pauper – account book of Wroclaw, 1299–1358 (in German and Latin)
- Dorn, Leonard (2016), Regimentskultur und Netzwerk. Dietrich Goswin von Bockum-Dolffs und das Kürassier-Regiment No. 1 in Breslau 1788-1805 (Vereinigte Westfälische Adelsarchive e.V., Veröffentlichung Nr. 20). Münster
- Scheuermann, Gerhard (1994). Das Breslau-Lexikon (2 vols.). Dülmen: Laumann Verlagsgesellschaft. ISBN 978-3-89960-132-9.
- Thum, Gregor (2003). Die fremde Stadt. Breslau 1945. Berlin: Siedler. ISBN 978-3-88680-795-6.
- van Rahden, Till (2000). Juden und andere Breslauer: Die Beziehungen zwischen Juden, Protestanten und Katholiken in einer deutschen Großstadt von 1860 bis 1925. Göttingen: Vandenhoeck & Ruprecht. ISBN 978-3-525-35732-3.
- Weczerka, Hugo (2003). Handbuch der historischen Stätten: Schlesien. Kröners Taschenausgabe (2 ed.). Stuttgart: Alfred Kröner Verlag. ISBN 3-520-31602-1.
