= Arbeiter-Zeitung =

Arbeiter-Zeitung (German for 'Workers Newspaper') may refer to several newspapers:

- Arbeiter-Zeitung (Chicago), a German language radical newspaper
- Arbeiter-Zeitung (Vienna), an Austrian socialist newspaper
- Arbeiter-Zeitung (Luxembourg), a socialist newspaper
- Arbeiter-Zeitung (Timișoara), a Romanian socialist newspaper
- Schlesische Arbeiter-Zeitung, a socialist newspaper from Breslau, Germany
- Arbeiter-Illustrierte-Zeitung, a Communist-affiliated paper published in Berlin and Prague
- Kommunistische Arbeiter-Zeitung, the newspaper of the Communist Workers' Party of Germany
- Marxistische Arbeiterzeitung, the newspaper of the "New Left" Marxistische Gruppe
- Allegemeiner Arbeiter Zeitung, the German-language edition of the Hungarian Általános Munkás Újság
- Sächsische Arbeiterzeitung, a defunct newspaper of the Social Democratic Party of Germany for Saxony, once edited by Georg Gradnauer
- Sozialistische Arbeiter-Zeitung, a daily newspaper published in Germany between 1931 and 1933
- Arbeiter Zeitung (SLP), a New York City Yiddish newspaper of the Socialist Labor Party of America
