= Arbeiter =

Arbeiter (German: worker) may refer to

Publications:

- Arbeiter-Zeitung (disambiguation), several newspapers
- Arbeiter-Illustrierte-Zeitung, a German-language magazine published in 1924–1938
- Arbeiter Fragen, journal of the Jewish Bundist trade unions active in Poland in the 1920s and 1930s
- Arbeiter Ring Publishing, an American book publisher
- Bauer und Arbeiter, a German-language communist newspaper published in Baku in 1924
- Banater Arbeiter-Presse, a German-language socialist newspaper published from Romania in 1925–1927
- Der jüdische Arbeiter (disambiguation), several periodicals
- Freie Arbeiter Stimme, an anarchist periodical in the Yiddish language

People:

- Argo Arbeiter (born 1973), Estonian association football player

Other uses:

- Arbeiter-Turn- und Sportbund, a German sports organization active in 1893–1933
- Ost-Arbeiter, a designation for slave laborers from Central and Eastern Europe in Germany during World War II
- Arbeiter at the Gate, a noise-rock album by Steve Lieberman
