= Der jüdische Arbeiter =

Der jüdische Arbeiter, German for "The Jewish Worker", may refer to:

- Der jüdische Arbeiter (Vienna), a German-language periodical
- Der yidisher arbeyter (Paris), a Yiddish-language periodical
- Der yidisher arbeyter (Vilna), a Yiddish-language periodical
