= Intersektsionen Byuro =

The Intersektsionen Byuro ('Inter-Sectional Bureau') was a committee of Yiddish-speaking sections of the French trade union confederation Confédération générale du travail (CGT).

Intersektsionen Byuro was founded at the first conference of the Jewish labour movement in France, held in December 1910.

Intersektsionen Byuro emerged from the efforts of Solomon Lozovsky, an exiled Russian-Jewish social democrat, and other Jewish radicals to unite different Yiddish-speaking union sections. It functioned as a link between the Jewish and French labour movements. Intersekstionen Byuro was modelled after the Deutsche Arbeiter Kartell ('German Workers Cartel'), the organization of German workers in France. Intersekstionen Byuro united Yiddish-speaking sections of unions among cobblers, locksmiths, woodworkers, bakers, leatherworkers, tailors and barbers as well as the Syndicat des casquettiers (Capmakers Union, the first Jewish trade union in Paris, founded in 1896). All in all, Intersektsionen Byuro gathered over a dozen trade union sections in Paris. The organization published the journal Der yidisher arbeyter ('The Jewish Worker') as its organ.

The organization found itself in the midst of ongoing debates of the role of Jewish separatism in the labour movement; the Bundists wished to have a more distinct 'Jewish' movement whilst the anarchists claimed the Jewish separatism of the Intersektsionen Byuro was going too far. At the second conference of the Jewish labour movement, held in December 1912, the Bundists (refugees after the defeat of the Russian Revolution of 1905) proposed creating a completely independent Jewish labour centre (i.e. breaking the bonds with the French CGT). This proposal was rejected by the majority at the conference.

The organization ceased to exist in 1914. In 1923 the Confédération générale du travail unitaire (CGTU) organized the Intersindikale kommisie as a continuation of the Intersektsionen Byuro, notably a majority of Jewish workers had joined CGTU in the CGT-CGTU split.
