= Marszowice, Wrocław =

Neighborhood of Wrocław, Poland

Marszowice
- Neighborhood of Wrocław
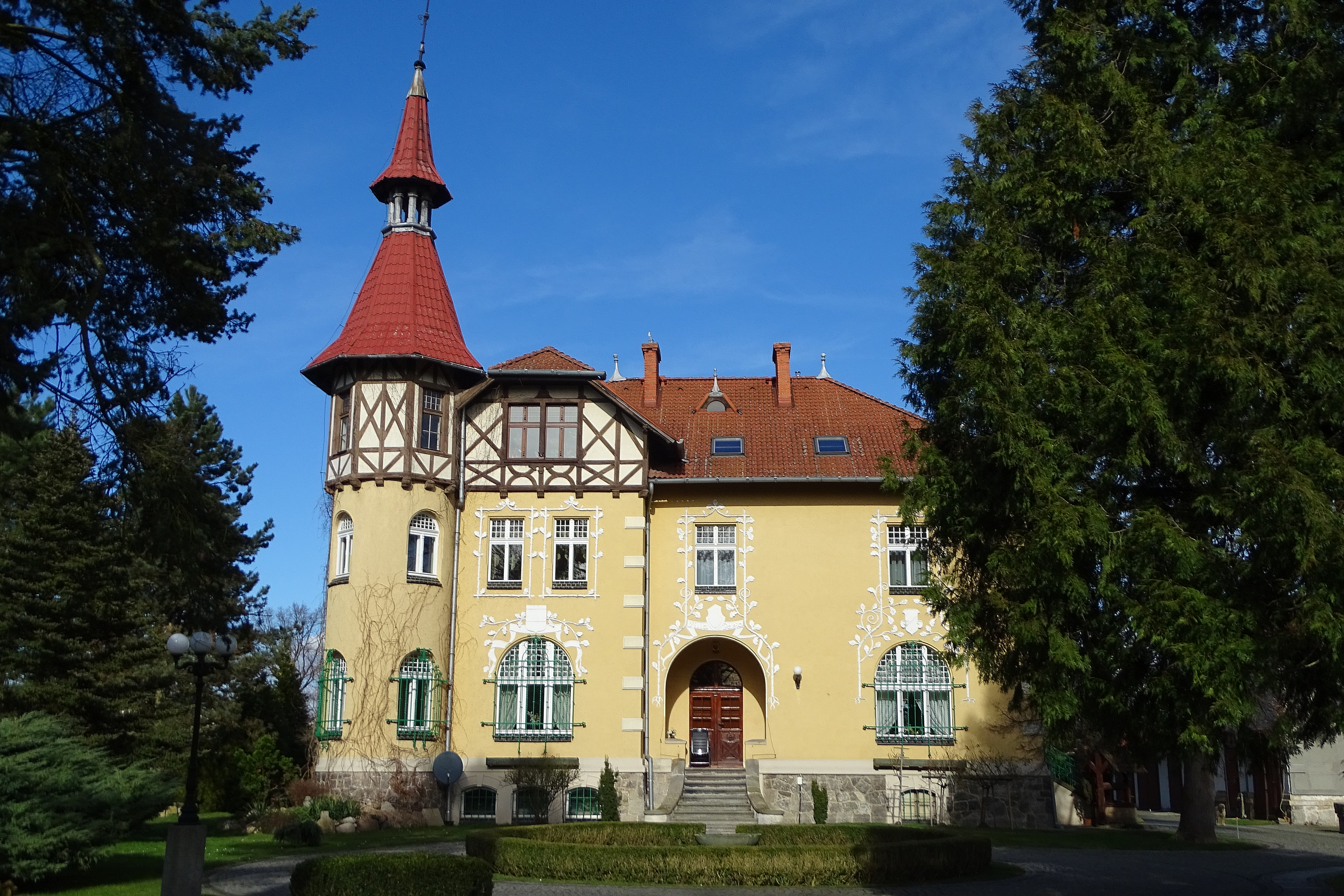
- Villa Basia

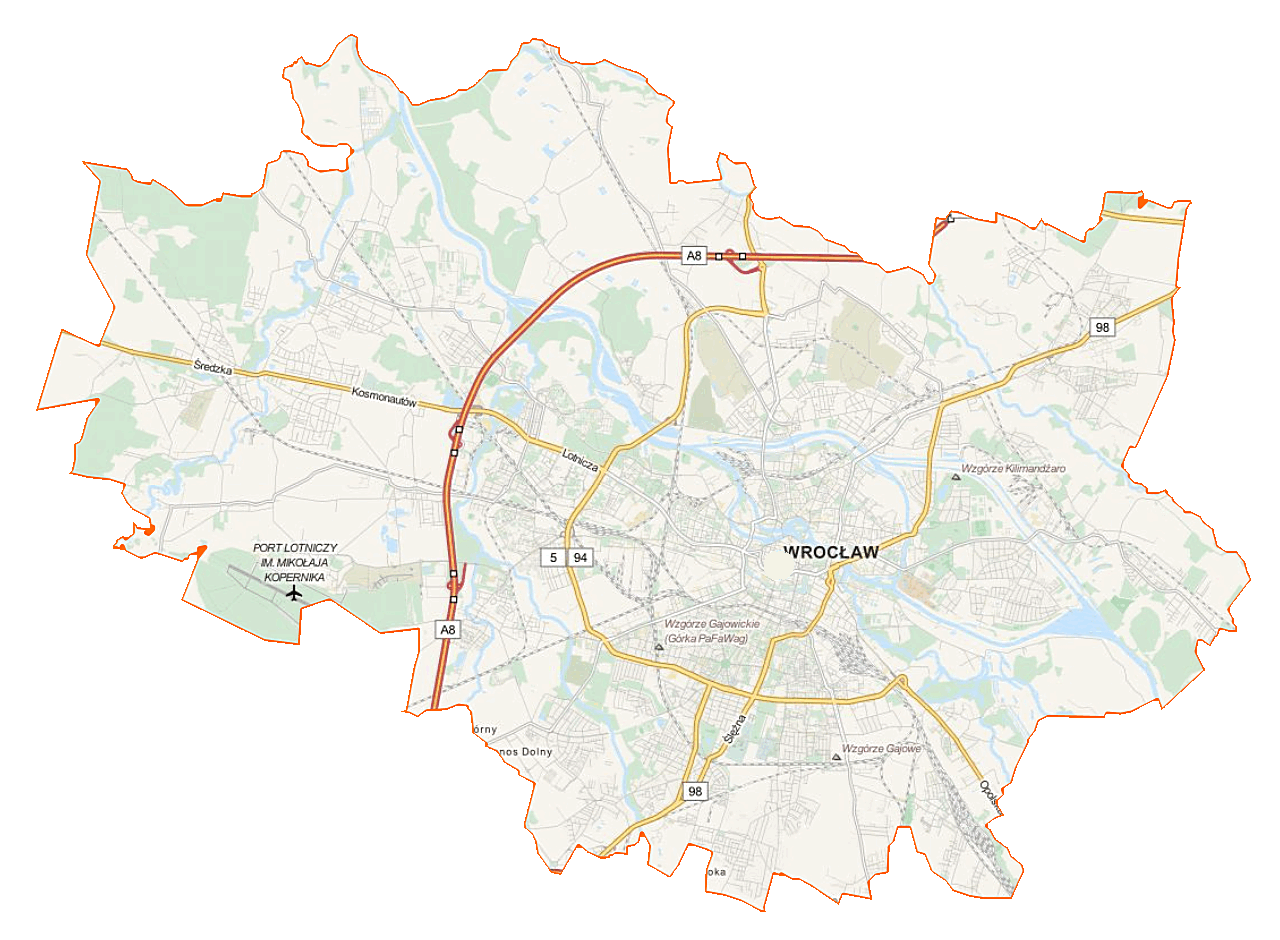
- Location within Wrocław Location within Poland
- Coordinates: 51°9′56″N 16°52′29″E
- Country: Poland
- Voivodeship: Lower Silesian
- County/City: Wrocław
- District: Leśnica
- Within city limits: 1973
- Time zone: UTC+1 (CET)
  - Summer (DST): UTC+2 (CEST)

Marszowice is a neighborhood of Wrocław, Poland, located in the western part of the city.

== Details ==
The name of the settlement is derived from the Polish word marsz, which means "march", in reference to marches when horses were herded to pasture.

The Marszowice Barrage with a hydroelectric power station is located in the neighborhood.

Marszowice was partially flooded during the 2024 Central European floods, however, for the most part, houses and apartment blocks were spared thanks to anti-flood embankments built in the meantime.
