= Bernhard Schottländer =

German politician and journalist

Bernhard Schottländer (1895–1920) was a German socialist politician and journalist.

== Biography ==
Schottländer grew up in one of the richest Jewish families in Breslau (present-day Wrocław in Poland). His family shielded him during his childhood, as he was sickly and had trouble walking. He was constantly accompanied by a private tutor. In secondary school Schottländer was a schoolmate of Norbert Elias. Schottländer was drafted to military service in the First World War in spite of his weak physical state. He stayed at the same barrack as Ernst Toller in Heidelberg for a period.

Schottländer became a leading organizer of the Independent Social Democratic Party of Germany (USPD) in Breslau. In April 1919 he founded the newspaper Schlesische Arbeiter-Zeitung, and became its editor. Inside the USPD Schottländer argued for union with the Communist International.

In the midst of the Kapp Putsch, Schottländer was kidnapped on 14 March 1920. He was one of over 30 people captured by Freikorps troops under the leadership of Andreas von Aulock. Before being executed, Schottländer was subjected to torture. His mutilated body was found at Oswitz (some five kilometers away from Breslau) on 23 June 1920. His family had tried to keep the date and location of his funeral secret, but still around 2,000 workers paraded past his family residence (in the wealthiest part of the city) to show their respect. Writing about the murder of Schottländer, Jüdische Volkszeitung stated that he was 'martyred because of his religion'.
