= Általános Munkás Újság =

Hungarian newspaper

Általános Munkás Újság (Hungarian pronunciation: [ˈaːltɒlaːnoʃ ˈmuŋkaːʃ ˈuːjʃaːɡ]) was a newspaper in Hungary. It was the first socialist newspaper in the country. The newspaper began publishing in 1870. It was published jointly by two different socialist groups, the Pest-Buda Workers Education Association (which had begun as a workers self-help group supported by employers) and the General Workers Society (an organization formed in 1868 and campaigning for political rights for workers, such as universal suffrage). The former group was led by Károly Farkas, the representative of the First International in Hungary.

Általános Munkás Újság had a German-language edition, Allgemeiner Arbeiter Zeitung.
