= Arbeiter-Zeitung (Luxembourg) =

Newspaper in Luxembourg (1924-27)

Arbeiter-Zeitung ('Workers Newspaper') was a newspaper in Luxembourg, the central organ of the Workers Party of Luxembourg 1924–1927. In 1927, another newspaper, Escher Tageblatt, became the main party organ.
