= Der yidisher arbeyter (Paris) =

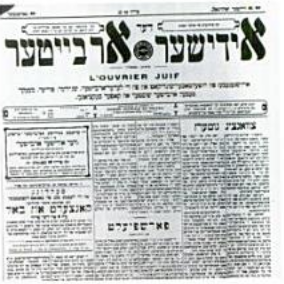
- Cover of Der yidisher arbeyter
- Publisher: Intersektionen Byuro
- Founded: October 9, 1911
- Ceased publication: July 4, 1914
- Language: Yiddish
- Headquarters: Paris
- Circulation: 2,000 (1911)

Der yidisher arbeyter (דער אידישער ארבייטער: 'The Jewish Worker') was a Yiddish-language labour movement journal published from Paris, France. It was the first full-fledged Jewish labour periodical in the country, and catered to the Jewish branches of the Confédération générale du travail (CGT). It was the monthly organ of the Intersektionen Byuro ('Inter-sectional Bureau'), the coordination of Jewish trade union branches of the CGT. The first issue appeared on October 9, 1911. Der yidisher arbeyter represented a crossroads between the French labour movement and the Central and European Jewish culture.

== Editorial stance ==
The pages of Der yidisher arbeyter were mainly dedicated to reports of CGT activity and the French and international labour movement. The different Jewish CGT branches posted news in the periodical. The Jewish CGT branches were of different political inclinations, a fact that was illustrated by different statements in Der yidisher arbeyter. The anarcho-syndicalists found it too reformist, the Bundists found it not Jewish enough, the anarchists found it too Jewish and some of its collaborators became accused of 'separatism' by the CGT leadership.

A key question was the separate identity of Jewish branches inside the French labour movement. In October 1912, a political debate was sparked in Der yidisher arbeyter. A Bundist furrier, E. Sviranski, wrote an article supporting the set-up by separate Jewish sections. He stated that French unions did not attend to the needs of Jewish workers, and that Jewish workers ought to unite around their common language and shared working conditions. In short, Sviranski sought greater autonomy for the Intersektionen Byuro of the CGT (of which Sviranski was a prominent member). Sviranski's claim that Jewish workers had specific working conditions was rejected by the editors of the periodical, in an article in the following issue. The debate lasted for a few months. In the end the dispute was settled, the majority sided for the position of CGT loyalists. However, a 'Free Tribune' column was introduced which continued to function as an open forum of debate.

Upon the outbreak of the First World War, the publication took a pacifist stance. This led to a break with the French labour movement, leading to the end of the periodical. The last issue was published on July 4, 1914.

== Description ==
In total, 25 issues of the newspaper were published. Alexandre Losovsky was a prominent contributor to the periodical.

The financial situation of Der yidisher arbeyter was precarious and the journal lacked staff. It received funds from various unions, such as the cap makers, furriers, leather workers, tailors, bakers and tinsmiths. In 1911 only two issues were published. Two thousand copies were printed for the first issue, but only 800 were sold. The periodical was relaunched on May 1, 1912.
