= Schlesische Arbeiter-Zeitung =

German language newspaper (1919-33)

- 18 February 1933 issue
- Founder: Bernhard Schottländer
- Editor: Bernhard Schottländer (1919–1920), Erich Gentsch (1921), Stefan Heymann (1933)
- Founded: 1919
- Ceased publication: April 1926
- Political alignment: USPD (1919–1920), KPD (1920–1933)
- Language: German language
- Headquarters: Breslau
- Circulation: ~42,000 (early 1930s)
- Sister newspapers: Die Rote Fahne (Berlin)
- OCLC number: 727710186

Schlesische Arbeiter-Zeitung ('Silesian Workers Newspaper') was a left-wing German language newspaper published from Breslau, Province of Lower Silesia, Weimar Germany (present-day Wrocław in Poland) between 1919 and 1933.

== USPD period ==
The publication was founded by Bernhard Schottländer. The first issue was published on 1 April 1919.

Schlesische Arbeiter-Zeitung was an organ of the Independent Social Democratic Party of Germany (USPD). It had limited circulation. The newspaper had a supplement, Die Räte-Republik ('The Soviet Republic').

In January 1920 Schlesische Arbeiter-Zeitung began a series of attacks on Otto Hörsing, the SPD leader and State Commissar (who now wielded military force against the labour movement). In March 1920, during the Kapp Putsch, the Freikorps and the Navy seized control of Breslau. During this period Schottländer, the young editor of Schlesische Arbeiter-Zeitung, was brutally murdered.

== KPD ==
The newspaper became the regional organ of the Communist Party of Germany in Silesia. In March 1921 Erich Gentsch became editor of Schlesische Arbeiter-Zeitung.

In 1926 the name of the newspaper was changed to Arbeiter-Zeitung für Schlesien und Oberschlesien ('Workers Newspaper for Silesia and Upper Silesia'). During the latter period of the newspaper, the newspaper functioned as a local edition for the Berlin-based Die Rote Fahne. Around this period, it had a circulation of around 42,000. Stefan Heymann (formerly an editor of Die Rote Fahne) was appointed editor-in-chief of Arbeiter-Zeitung.
