= Dyrekcyjna Street =

Street in Wrocław, Poland

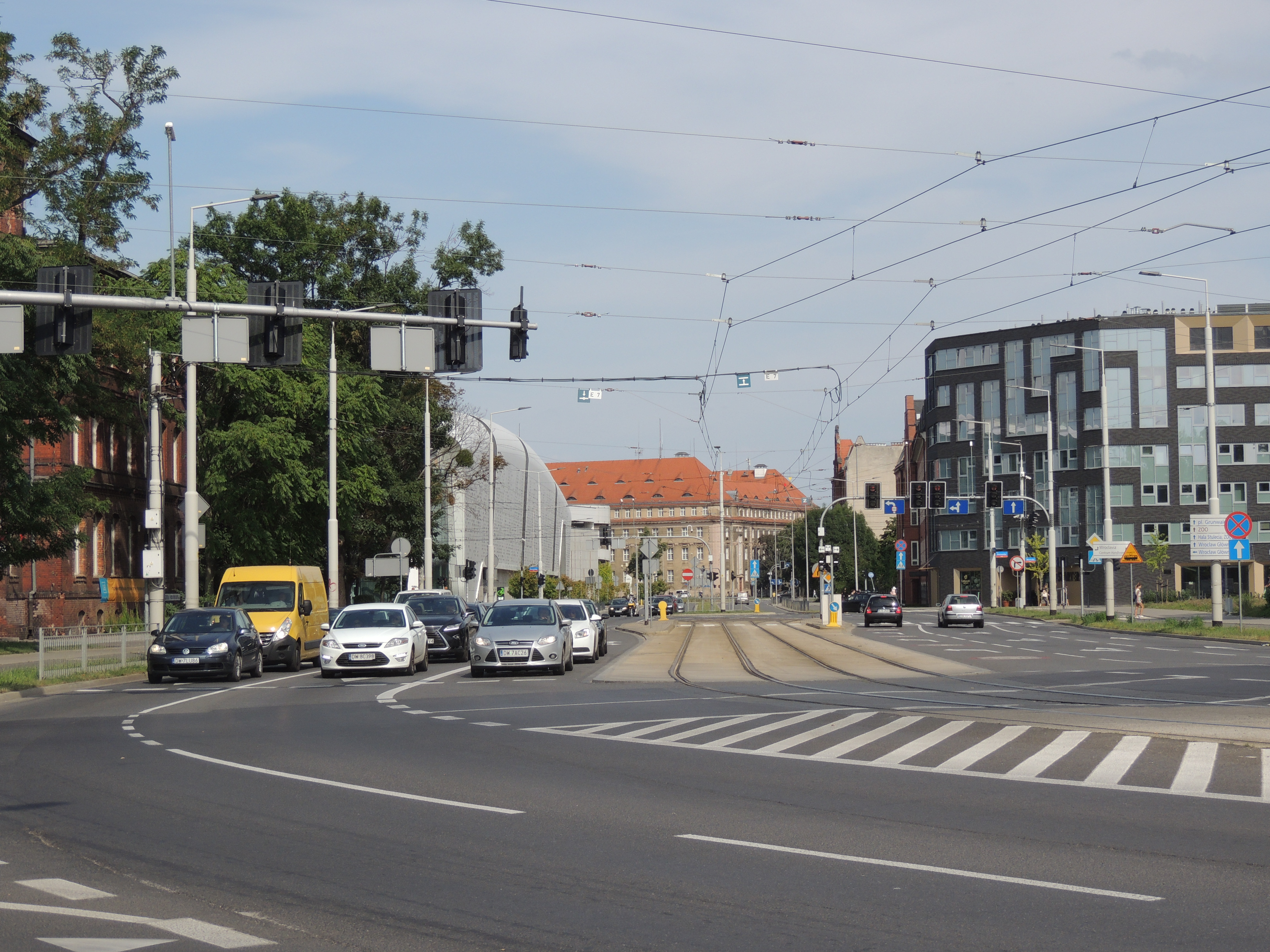
- View from Ślężna Street
- Interactive map of Dyrekcyjna Street
- Part of: Huby
- Length: 859 m (2,818 ft)
- Location: Wrocław, Poland
- Coordinates: 51°05′44.319″N 17°02′08.997″E

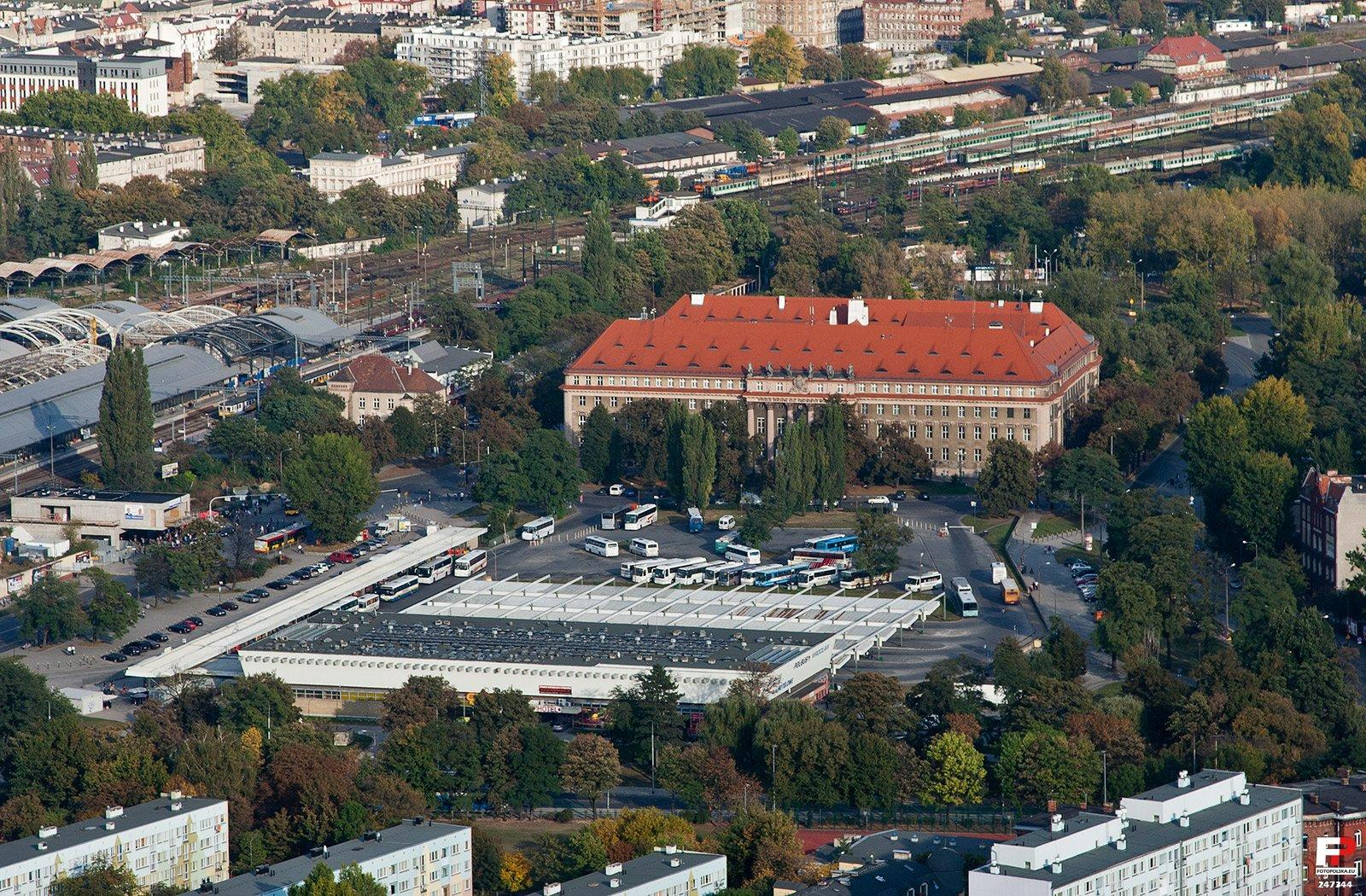
Before reconstruction

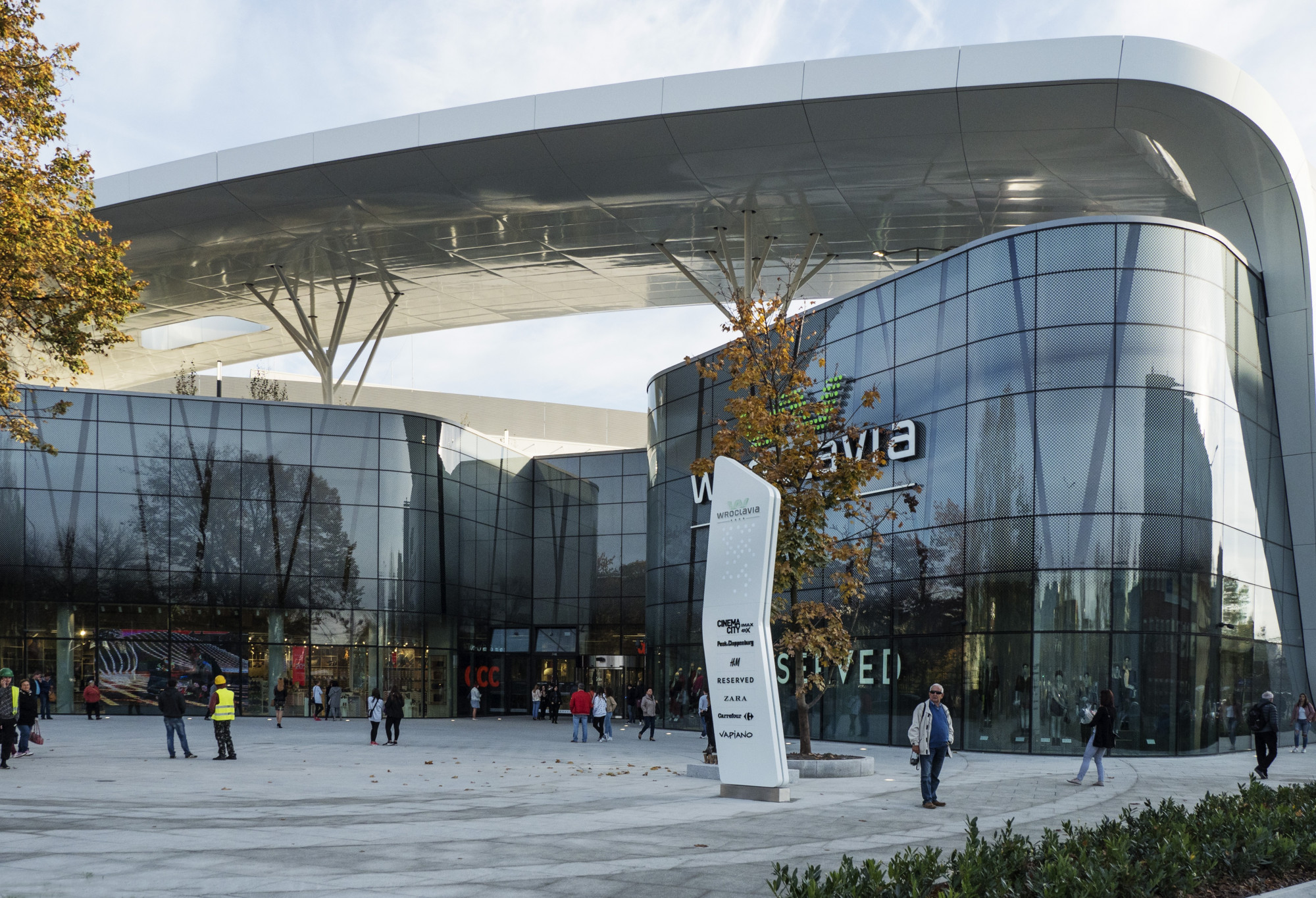
Entrance to Wroclavia from Borowska and Dyrekcyjna streets

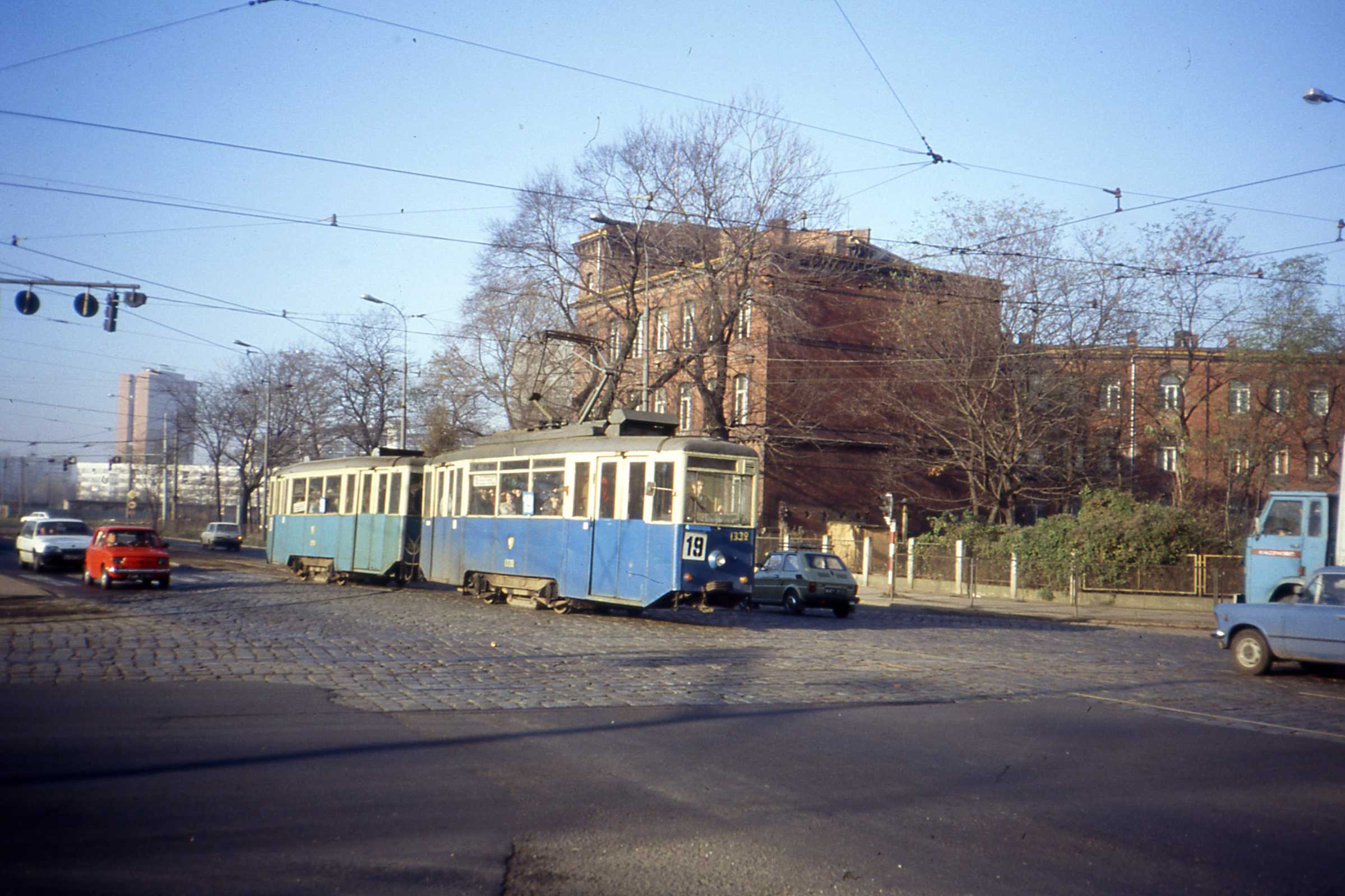
Tram on Dyrekcyjna Street in 1989

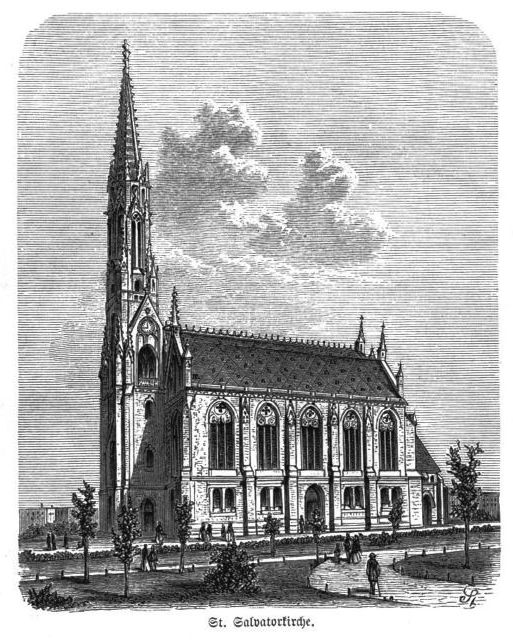
Non-existent Church of the Savior

Dyrekcyjna Street is a street in the Huby district of Wrocław, Poland, within the former Krzyki administrative area. Spanning 859 meters, it extends from Ślężna and Gliniana streets to the intersection with Hubska, Sucha, and General Kazimierz Pułaski streets. Located south of Wrocław Główny railway station, the street's historic urban layout is protected and listed in the municipal register of monuments, as are several buildings and structures along or near it, including the Royal Railway Directorate, now a Polish State Railways office building, which is registered as a heritage site.

== History ==
The section of Dyrekcyjna Street from Ślężna Street to Borowska Street existed in the mid-19th century as Brunnen Straße. The area bounded by present-day Borowska, Sucha, Gajowa, and Gliniana streets was undeveloped land, formerly the Pond Fields, after ponds were filled in. In this area, the evangelical Church of the Savior was built between 1871 and 1876 near Borowska Street. Destroyed during World War II in 1945, it was later demolished. The remaining area was developed into the Pond Fields Park, designed in the English landscape style.

Dyrekcyjna Street was laid out in 1895 as part of an urban plan by Alfred von Scholtz for the former Pond Fields area. This plan also included the creation of Joannitów and Jan Władysław Dawid streets, featuring a distinctive rectangular green square at their intersection (now the green area at Dawid Street).

Before Dyrekcyjna Street was established, an elementary school, Auf den Hälteräckern, was built between 1891 and 1892 at Ślężna Street (then Lohestrasse). Expanded until 1985, it included designs by architects such as Richard Plüddemann, Karl Klimm, and Hermann Froböse. In 1899, the Bethesda Hospital was constructed on the street's southern side. After World War II, it housed the Jan Mikulicz-Radecki University Hospital, including clinics for gynaecology, reproductive medicine, obstetrics, and neonatology. Between 1911 and 1914, the Royal Railway Directorate building was constructed, designed by H. König in a grand, Baroque Revival style on an irregular rectangular plan.

Before World War II, Dyrekcyjna Street had a non-uniform development. The initial section near Ślężna and Borowska streets was lined with tenement houses forming a compact, urban frontage along the streets. Further along, the northern side bordered a park surrounding the church, followed by the railway directorate building and green areas. The southern side included the hospital, a frontage of buildings at Joannitów Street, and allotment gardens up to Gajowa Street. A frontage of tenement houses also appeared at the end of the street near Gajowa and Hubska streets. During the siege of Wrocław in 1945, heavy fighting occurred as the Red Army advanced from the south. As a result of the hostilities and partially of the demolition of buildings by the German defenders of the city, a large part of the development was destroyed and not rebuilt after the war. Only the buildings of the school, hospital, kindergarten and the railway directorate have survived.

In September 1946, a kindergarten was established, initially at 52 Gajowa Street, later moved to Joannitów Street, and in 1950, to its current location at 15 Dyrekcyjna Street after renovations. Named Mały Kolejarz (Little Railwayman), it was one of Wrocław's first post-war kindergartens and the first railway-affiliated one.

In June 2008, construction started at Dyrekcyjna and Gajowa streets, resulting in the Villa Vratislavia residential building. From February 2013 to August 2014, the Dyrekcyjna 33 project created a mixed-use residential and commercial complex, designed by AP Szczepaniak and developed by ATAL S.A. from Cieszyn.

In the 1970s, National Road 8 and European Route E12 ran from Powstańców Śląskich Street via Swobodna and Sucha streets. Later, they were rerouted through Ślężna and Dyrekcyjna to Pułaski Street, redesignated as National Road 98 and E67. These roads lost their national status in 2019.

Since around 1905, a tram track ran the entire length of Dyrekcyjna Street from Ślężna Street to Pułaski Street. Between 2016 and 2019, the street was reconstructed, replacing cobblestone with asphalt, removing the tram track from Borowska Street to Hubska Street, adding bike paths, and redesigning green spaces and sidewalks. The final intersection with Sucha, Pułaski, and Hubska streets was rebuilt, including new tram tracks.

The street was planned as part of the Old Town Ring Road, later called the Southern Downtown Route, now known as the Southern Suburb Avenue, with a proposed western extension.

== Names ==
The street was originally named Gustav-Freytag-Strasse in German, honoring Gustav Freytag, a Silesian writer associated with Wrocław. After World War II, the Wrocław administration named it Dyrekcyjna Street on 7 March 1946.

== Road layout ==
Dyrekcyjna Street is a municipal road spanning 859 meters (road number 105847D, register number G1058470264011), with additional sections classified as private roads and reserves.

From its western end up to the intersection with Joannitów Street, it is a dual carriageway with two lanes per direction, with additional turning lanes marked on some parts. Beyond Joannitów Street, it becomes a single carriageway with two lanes each way. Throughout its length, the carriageways have a bituminous surface. A tram track runs in the median from Ślężna Street to Borowska Street. Bike paths line both sides of the street, with a city bike station near Wroclavia shopping centre. These bike paths are designated as main cycling routes. Sidewalks are present on both sides.

The street has two-way intersections with Borowska, Joannitów, and Gajowa streets. All intersections, except Gajowa Street, have traffic lights.

== Transport and communication ==
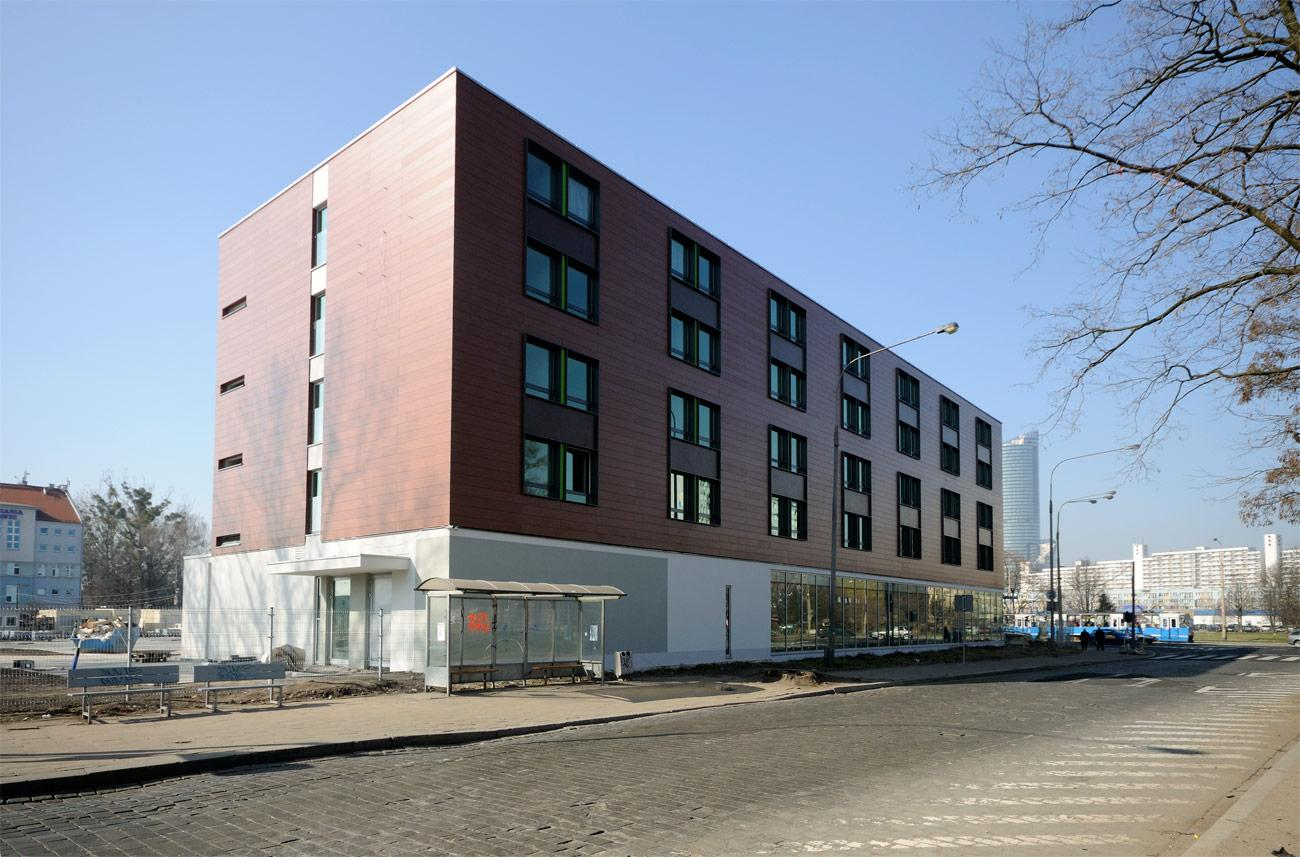
Campanile Hotel and Dyrekcyjna stop

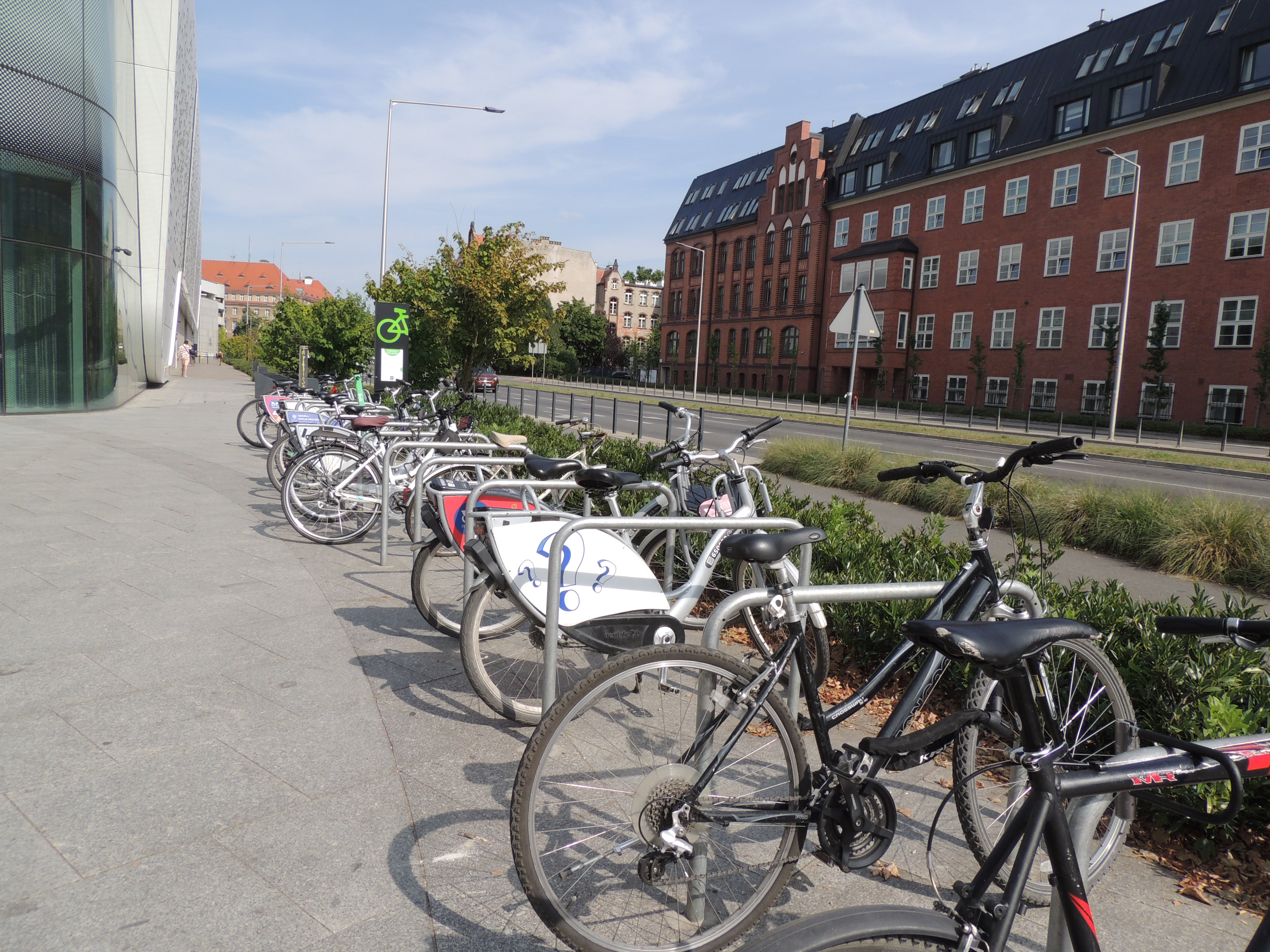
Bicycle station

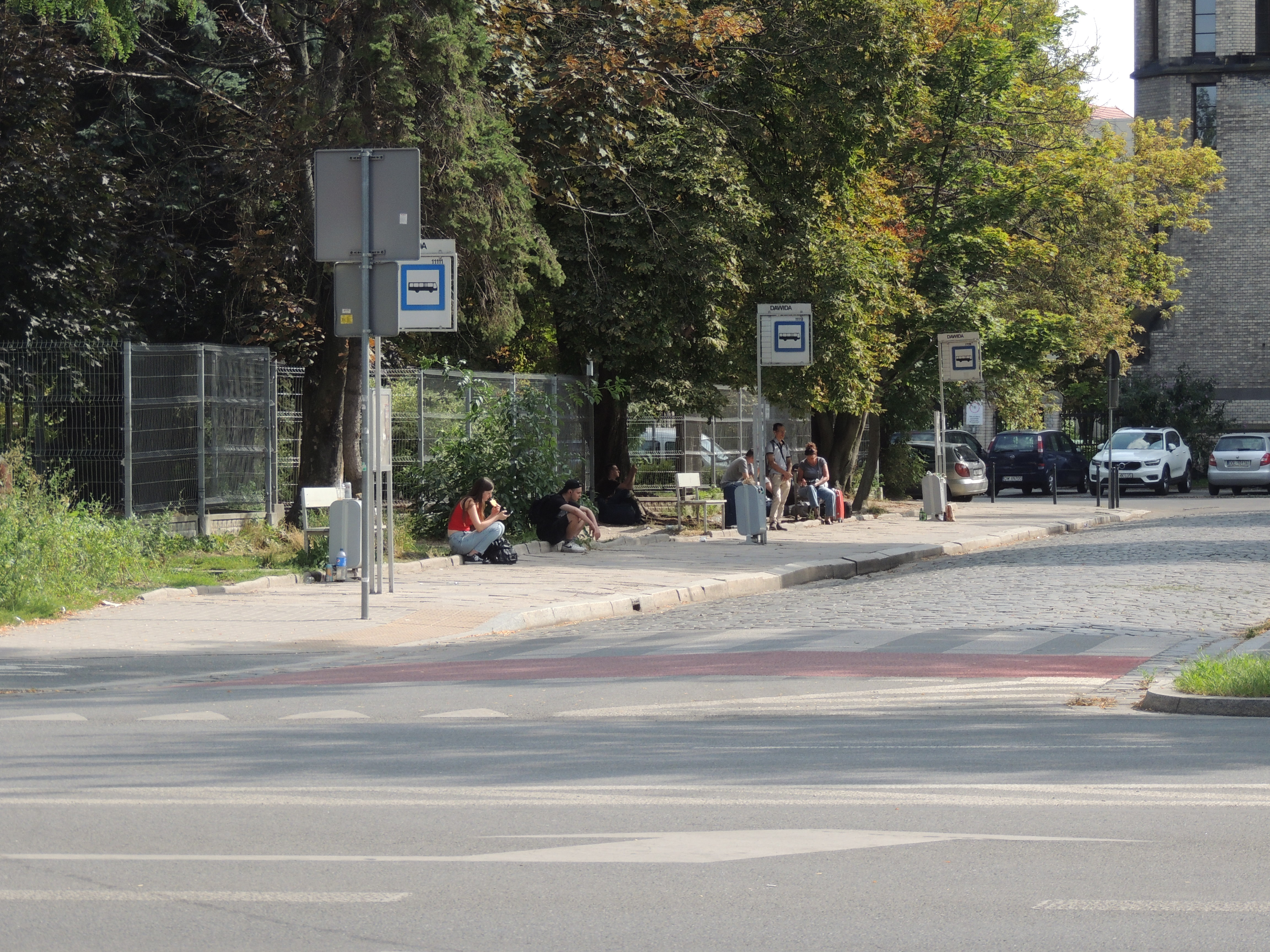
Dawid stops

No city bus lines run along Dyrekcyjna Street. A tram line operates from Ślężna Street to Borowska Street, without stops. A bus stop named "Dyrekcyjna" is located on Gliniana Street, heading from Ślężna Street to Borowska Street. Near the northern side of Sucha Street are the Wrocław Główny railway station and the Wroclavia shopping mall's bus station, forming integrated transport hubs. Bus stops for private local carriers are located at the Dawid Street connector.

The route through Ślężna, Dyrekcyjna, and Pułaski streets was once part of National Road 8, later National Road 98 after the Wrocław motorway bypass was built, and included E12, then E67. Trunk road status was revoked in 2019. The route is now classified as a main municipal road. The street's initial section is proposed for extension westward as part of the Southern Suburb Avenue, part of the Old Town Ring Road.

== Architecture and land use ==
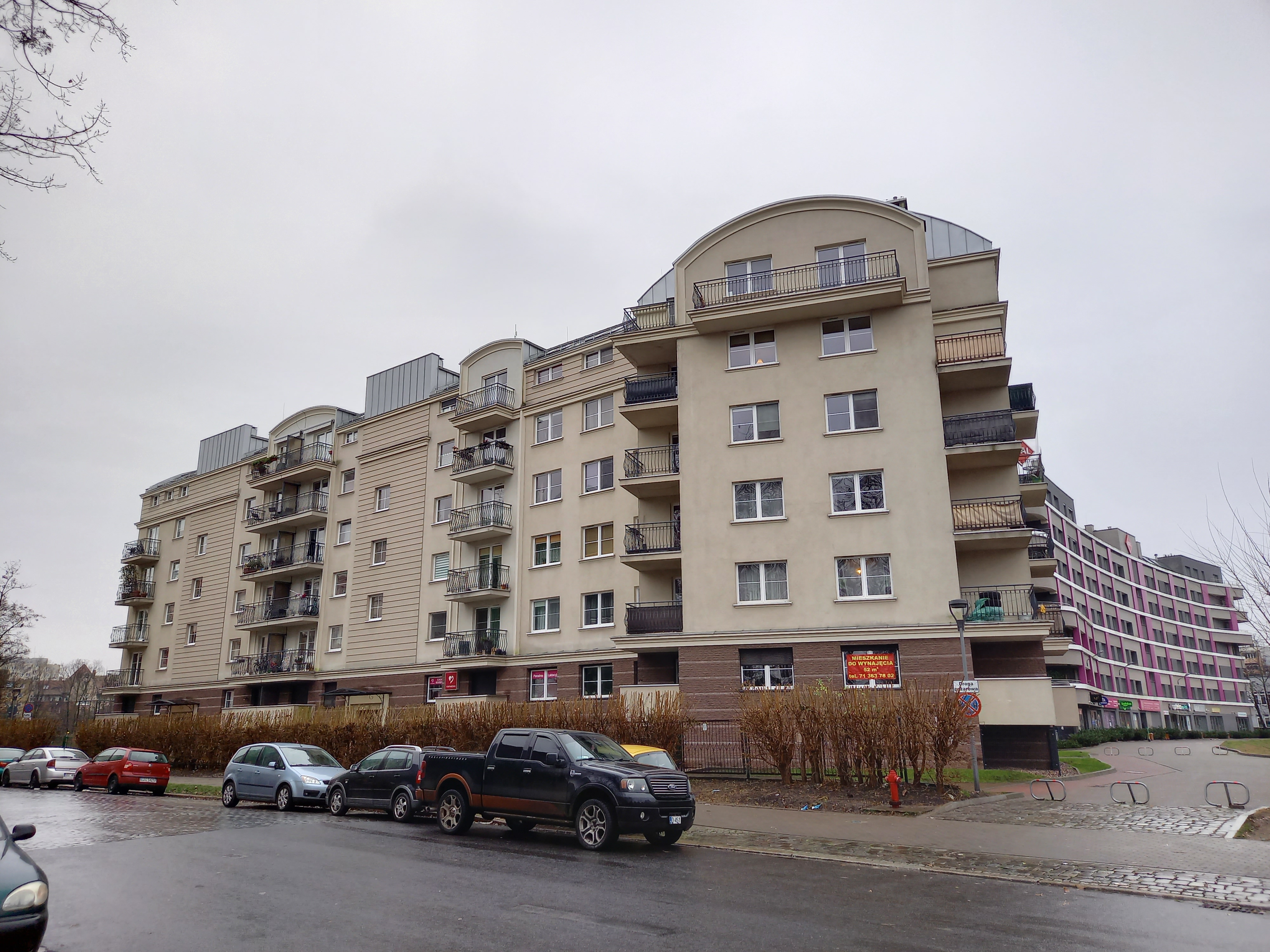
Villa Vratislavia

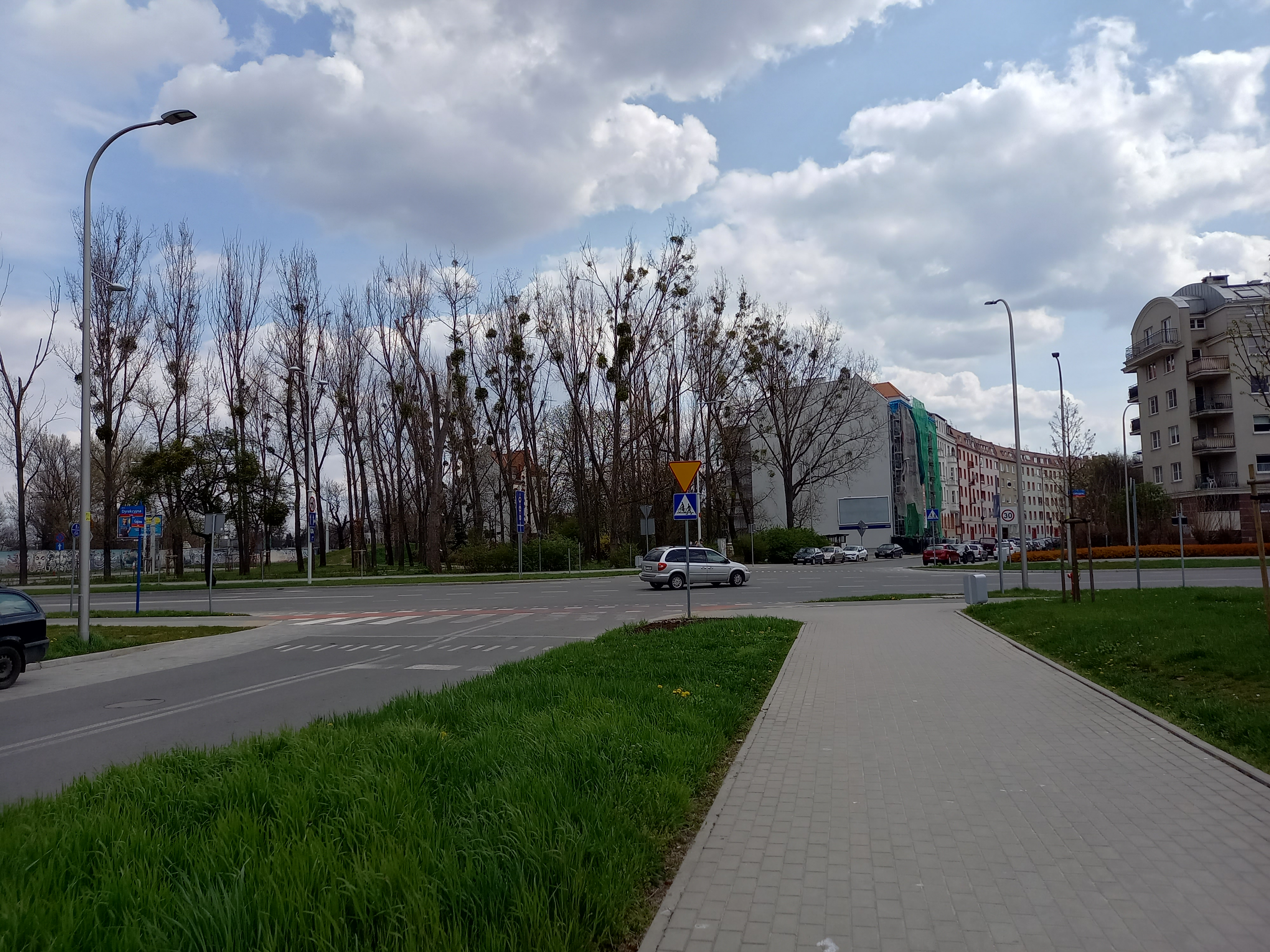
Gajowa Street, with Dyrekcyjna Street as the crossroad

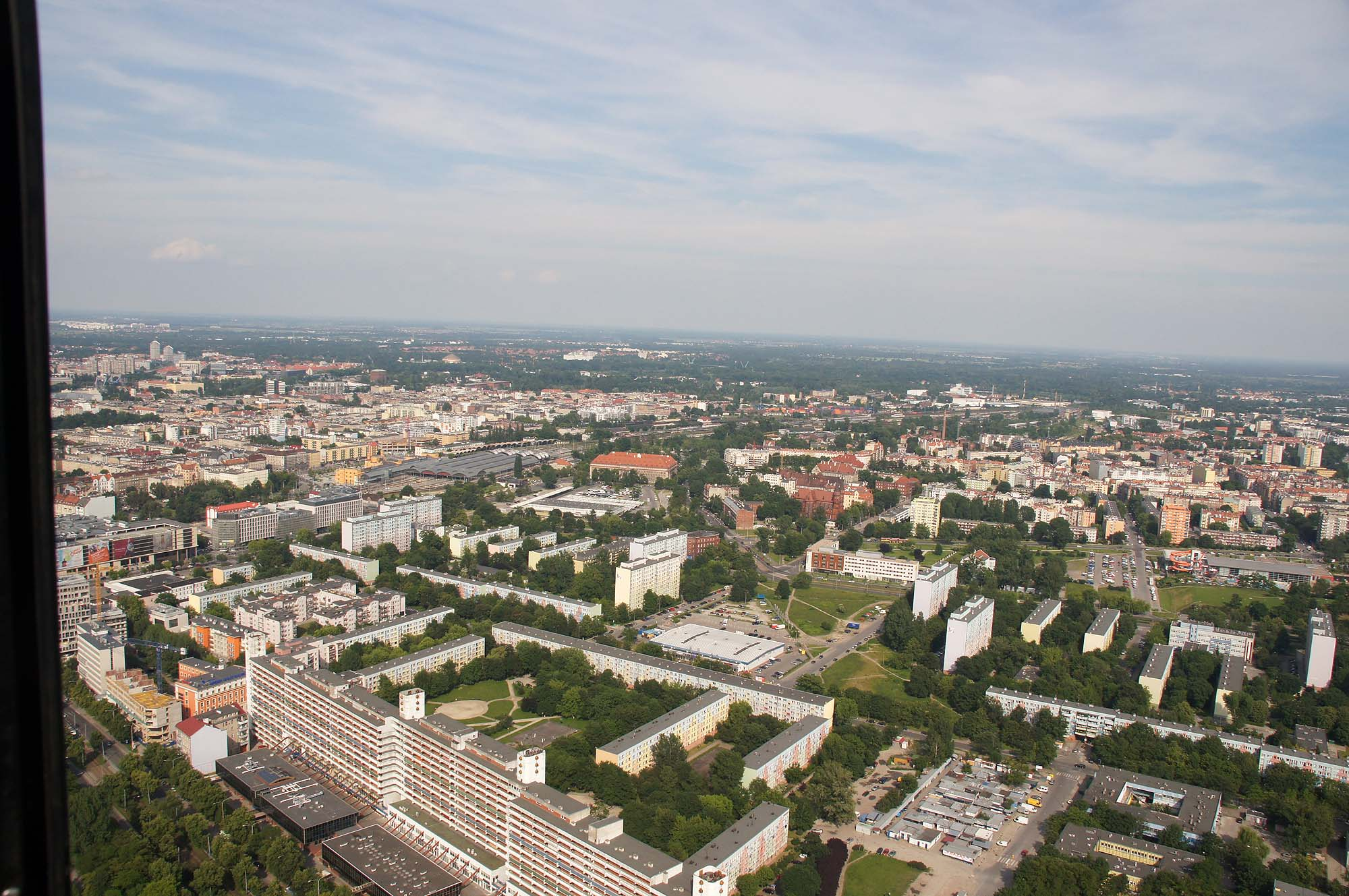
Południe estate

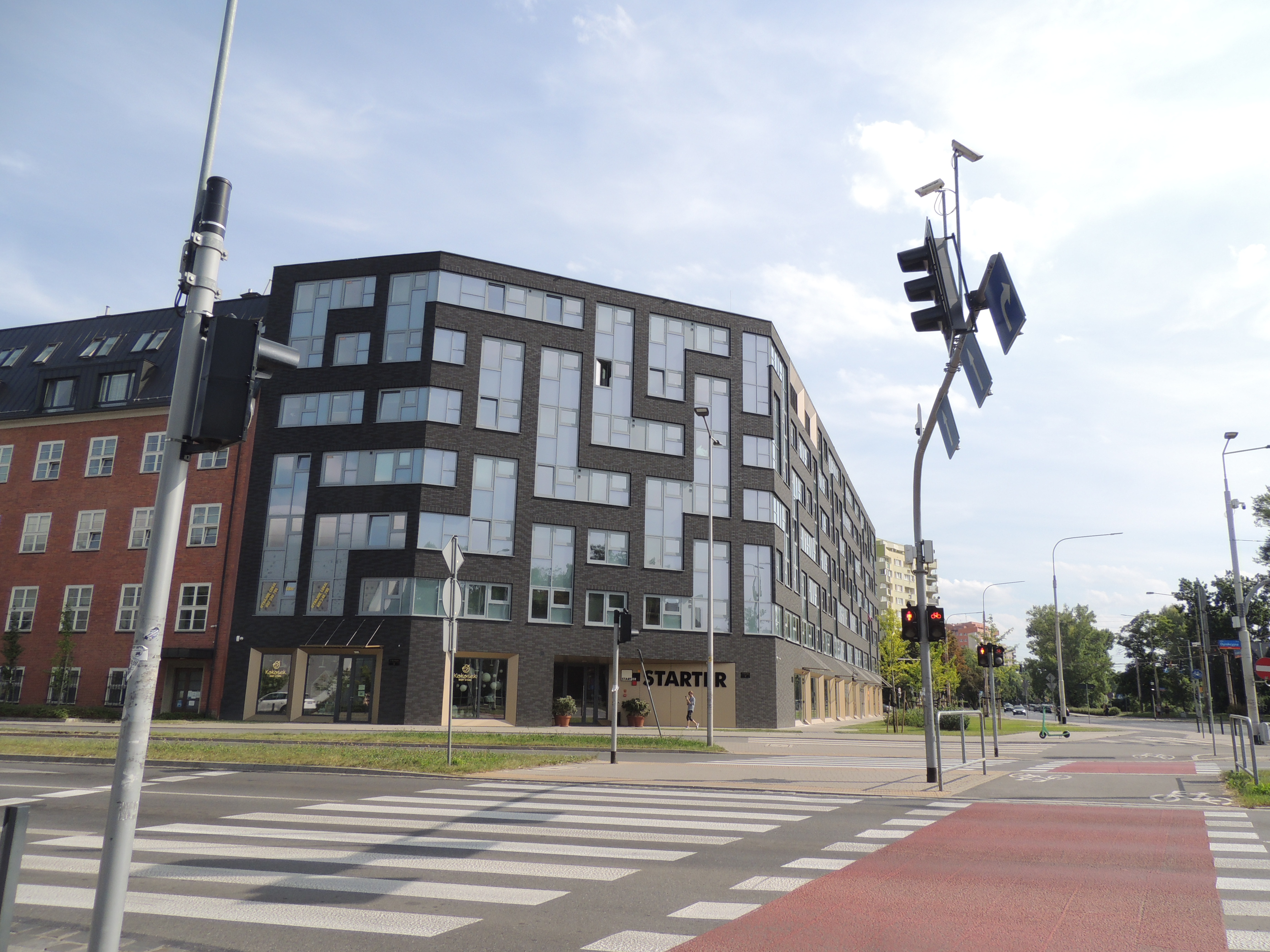
Starter III

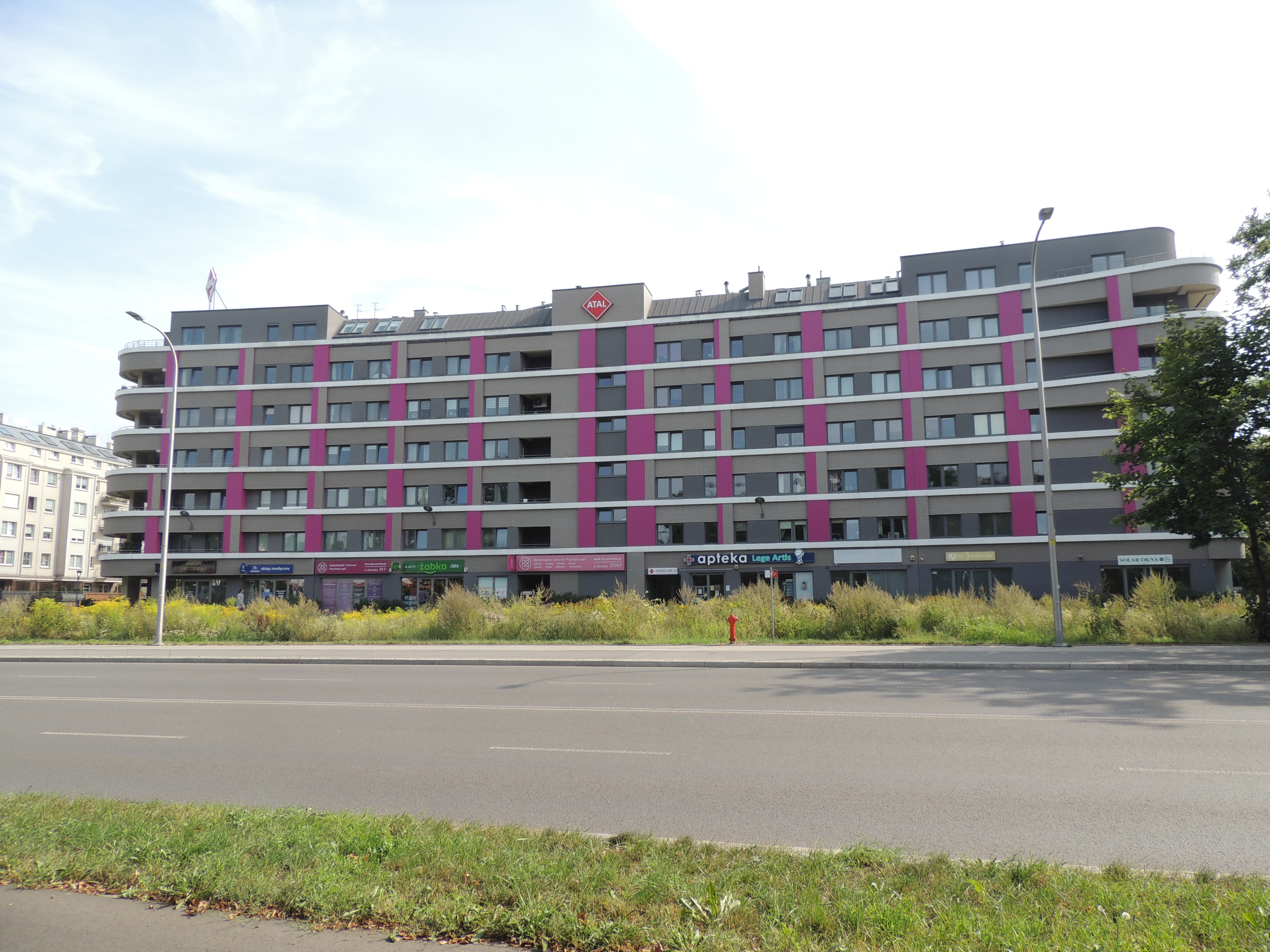
Dyrekcyjna 33

On the northern side, from Ślężna Street, there is an open small square and a school building, with the school grounds fenced up to Borowska Street. Historically, the building housed various schools, initially an elementary school, later a primary school, gymnasium, technical school, and other secondary schools.

From Borowska Street to Joannitów Street, the Wroclavia shopping mall is located, including office spaces and a bus station. The complex has three above-ground levels with about 200 shops, a 22-screen cinema on the +2 level, and a 2,300-space parking garage. The bus station is at ground level (entrances, ticket counters), with platforms underground. The POLBUS-PKS headquarters is at 13 Joannitów Street.

Beyond Joannitów is the Polish State Railways office building, formerly the Royal Railway Directorate, with a parking lot behind it. Before Gajowa Street, there is a fuel station, followed by a green area planned for future transport development.

On the southern side, from Gliniana Street to Borowska Street, there is a green area, followed by Gliniana Street and the Premiere Classe and Campanile hotels. Beyond Borowska is the Starter III building, adjacent to Angel Care. Starter III, built from 2017 to 2020, is a seven-story commercial-residential building with 255 micro-apartments (12–30 m²) from the first floor up and commercial spaces on the ground floor, designed by AP Szczepaniak for Dolnośląskie Inwestycje.

Angel Care is a revitalized historic complex of the former Bethesda Evangelical Hospital, later the gynaecology, obstetrics, and neonatology clinics of the University Hospital, renovated from 2014 to 2016. The six-story building now hosts a senior care center, research facility, protected apartments, a nursing home, and a dementia care center.

At 15 Dyrekcyjna Street is a three-story kindergarten building. Up to Joannitów Street, there is an undeveloped area zoned for potential 16–20-meter office-commercial buildings. Beyond Joannitów Street is a green area, followed by the National Health Fund building, and modern residential-commercial developments: Dyrekcyjna 33 and Villa Vratislavia, extending to Gajowa Street. Another green area follows. Dyrekcyjna 33 comprises six-story buildings with one underground level, 222 apartments (26–129 m²), and eight commercial units, with a usable area of 12,296 m². Villa Vratislavia includes 266 apartments (37–106 m²).

The street begins at Ślężna Street, adjacent to the post-war Barbara estate, part of the broader Południe Housing Estate from the 1970s, with five- and eleven-story large-panel-system buildings. Space was reserved opposite Dyrekcyjna Street for the Old Town Ring Road extension, on the Powstańców Śląskich estate.

The street lies at an elevation of 119.0–119.8 meters above sea level. It spans two statistical districts (as of 31 December 2020):

- No. 931640, from Ślężna Street to Borowska Street, with 1,211 residents and a density of 1,434 people/km².
- No. 931400, from Borowska Street to Hubska and Pułaski streets, with 1,954 residents and a density of 872 people/km².

== Green spaces ==
Green areas
Name	Parameter	Side	Location	Photograph
Green area at Borowska and Ślężna streets with a boardwalk along General Władysław Anders Park and Skowroni Park, tree espalier along Gliniana Street's northern side	Area: 5,797 m²	Southern	Between Dyrekcyjna, Gliniana, and Borowska streets, extending along Borowska Street's western side	
Park green area, tree espalier along Borowska Street's western side	Within the road reserve from Dyrekcyjna and Borowska streets, and adjacent land	Northern	Along Dyrekcyjna Street's northern side, Borowska Street, and between Borowska and Ślężna streets behind the school	
Tree espalier	Within the road reserve from Borowska Street to Joannitów Street	Northern	South of Wroclavia	
Square	Open non-public land within the Polish State Railways directorate plot	Northern	Between the Polish State Railways directorate building, Joannitów, and Sucha streets	
Green area at Dawid Street	Area: 1,334 m²	Southern	Between Dyrekcyjna, Joannitów, Dawid streets, and Dawid Street connector	
Green area at Sucha and Dyrekcyjna streets	Area: 1,775 m²	Northern	Between Gajowa, Sucha, and Dyrekcyjna streets	
Green area at Hubska and Gajowa streets	Area: 5,703 m²	Southern	Between Gajowa, Hubska, Dyrekcyjna streets, and buildings at 8–10 Gajowa Street and 7 Hubska Street	

== Complete neighborhood ==
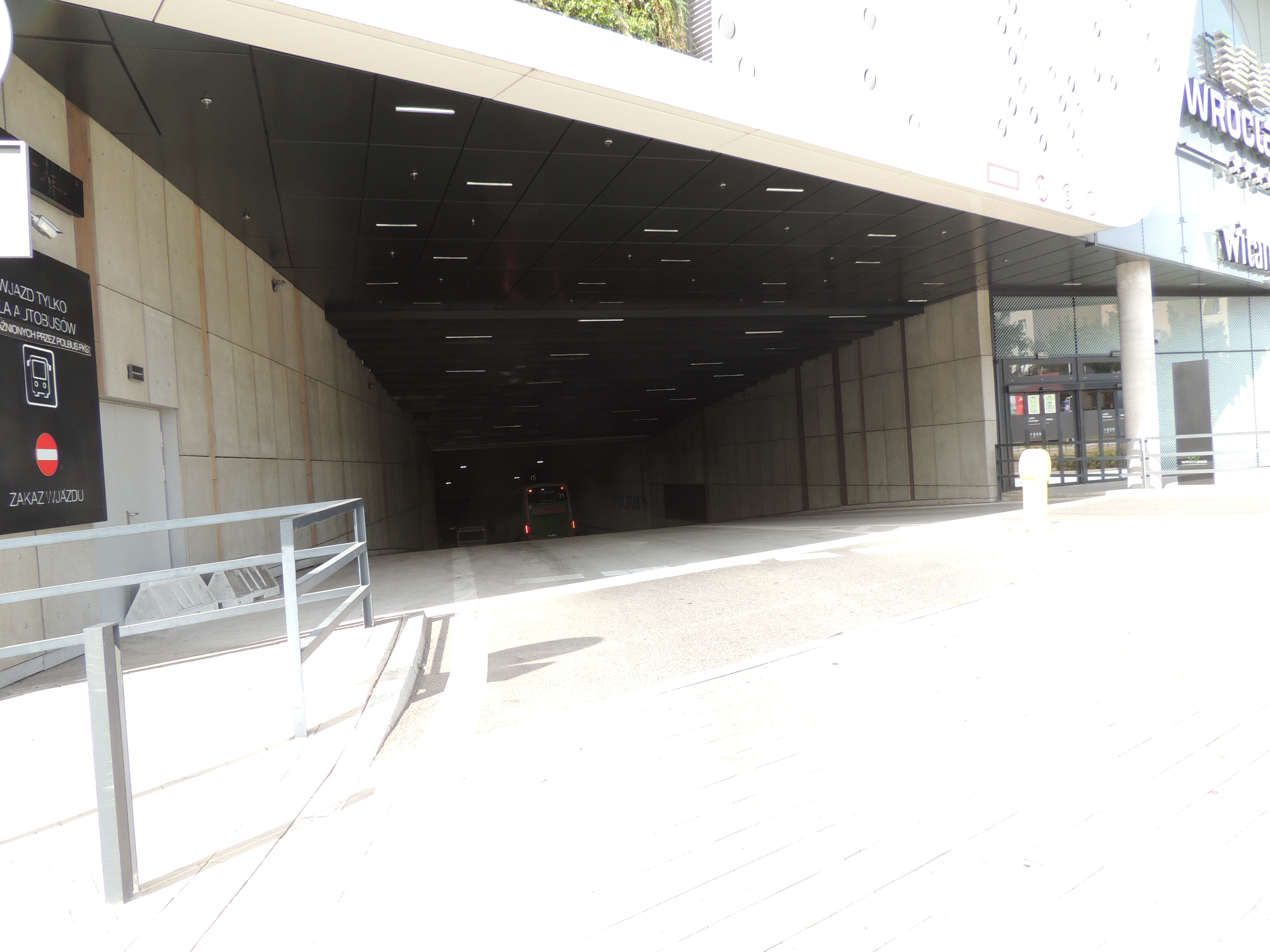
Entrance to the PKS bus station

Only the initial section of Dyrekcyjna Street, from Ślężna Street to Borowska STreet, is part of the "complete neighborhood" – Southern Downtown – designated by urban planners as the southern boundary of this area. This project, based on spatial guidelines and public consultation, outlines development directions. The intersection of Dyrekcyjna, Borowska, and Ślężna streets is a main public space, serving as a recognizable landmark and meeting point, linked to Wroclavia and the school. It offers essential services and community spaces. Dyrekcyjna Street, Ślężna Street (southward), and the planned Southern Suburb Avenue are city-wide arteries, while Borowska and Ślężna streets (northward) form the backbone of the neighborhood's public space. North of the planned route, along Studzienna Street to Komandorska Street, is the Komandorska Service Area with defined service standards and the CH Arena for retail, gastronomy, and small services. The entire street is considered a city-wide space.

== Conservation and monuments ==
The area through which Dyrekcyjna Street runs (except from Ślężna Street to Borowska Street) is protected and listed in the municipal register of monuments under Huby and Glinianki. The historic urban layout around Sucha, Hubska, Kamienna, and Borowska streets, including General Władysław Anders Park and a tram depot, developed from the 1860s, 20th century, and post-1945, is well-preserved.

The following monuments are located along or near the street:

Heritage sites
Object, location	Construction, register number	Photograph
Northern side
Elementary school, now secondary schools 2–24 Ślężna Street (22 Ślężna Street)	1881–1882 (designed by Robert Mende), 1895 (expansion by Richard Plüddemann, Karl Klimm, Hermann Froböse) Protection: municipal register, local plan	
Royal Railway Directorate, now Polish State Railways office 13 Joannitów Street	1911–1914 Protection: national register A/1258, 6 October 2009	
Air-raid shelter III Sucha Street, plot 2/4 AM-18 Południe	After 1935 Protection: municipal register, local plan	
Southern side
Bethesda Evangelical Hospital complex – Gynecology, Obstetrics, and Neonatology Clinic 5–7 Dyrekcyjna Street	Protection: other	
Building 1: Bethesda Evangelical Hospital, now unused 5–7 Dyrekcyjna Street	Circa 1880 Protection: other	
Building 2: Bethesda Evangelical Hospital, now unused 5–7 Dyrekcyjna Street	1930s Protection: other	
Building 3: Bethesda Evangelical Hospital – mortuary, now unused 5–7 Dyrekcyjna Street	Circa 1880 Protection: other	
Building 4: Bethesda Evangelical Hospital – chapel 5–7 Dyrekcyjna Street	Protection: other	
Ambulance station, now Kindergarten No. 50 15 Dyrekcyjna Street	Circa 1905 Protection: other	
Urban square Dawid Street, plot 6 AM-18 Południe	Early 20th century Protection: municipal register, local plan	

== See also ==
- History of Wrocław

== Bibliography ==
- Harasimowicz, Jan, ed. (2006). Encyklopedia Wrocławia [Encyclopedia of Wrocław] (in Polish) (3rd ed.). Wrocław: Wydawnictwo Dolnośląskie. ISBN 978-83-7384-561-9.
