= The Journalists (1852 play) =

Comedy in four acts written by Gustav Freytag

- Original language: German
- Written by: Gustav Freytag
- Characters: Retired Colonel Berg; Ida, his daughter; Adelheid Runeck; Senden, a landowner; Professor Oldendorf, editor of the "Union" newspaper; Konrad Bolz, editor of the "Union" newspaper; Bellmaus, employee of the "Union" newspaper; Kämpe, employee of the "Union" newspaper; Körner, employee of the "Union" newspaper; Henning the printer, owner of the "Union" newspaper; Müller, factotum of the Union newspaper; Blumenberg, editor of the "Coriolan" newspaper.; Schmock, employee of the "Coriolan" newspaper.; Piepenbrink, wine merchant and elector; Lotte, his wife; Berta, her daughter; Kleinmichel, citizen and elector; Fritz, his son; Justizrat Schwarz; A singer; Korb, clerk of Adelheid's estate; Karl, servant of the colonel; A waiter; Guests, deputations of the citizenry
- Genre: comedy
- Setting: "The capital of a province."

Premiere
- Date: 8 December 1852
- Place: Breslau

The Journalists is a comedy in four acts by Gustav Freytag. It was first performed in 1852 and first printed in 1854. It is still regarded as one of the most successful German comedies. It was a staple of theatre repertoires for five decades after its premiere. Freytag was editor of the Leipzig periodical Die Grenzboten from 1848 to 1860, and used his experience there in writing this play.

== Contents ==
=== Act I ===
==== Scene 1 ====
Various people go in and out of the house of the retired Colonel Berg. Firstly, there is Professor Oldendorf, editor of the newspaper "Union" and candidate for a party in the forthcoming chamber elections. He and Ida, the colonel's daughter, would like to marry, but the colonel has personal reservations about Oldendorf.

In addition, editors of the rival newspaper, the "Coriolan", also frequent the house. With their help, the landowner Senden wants to drive a wedge between the colonel and the "Union" or Oldendorf. They have anonymously printed an article by the colonel, which they themselves know is boring and attackable in content. Their calculation works: The article is sharply criticised in Oldendorf's "Union", which drives the colonel up the wall.

Finally, Adelheid von Runeck also arrives at the house. She has left her estate in the village of Rosenau in view of the impending winter and wants to inquire about her childhood friend Konrad Bolz, who has meanwhile also become editor of the "Union" and is said to be leading a restless life.

==== Scene 2 ====
Oldendorf gets the editorial staff of the "Union" to forbid any further scathing critique of the colonel's anonymous articles in the "Coriolan". Meanwhile, editor Bolz learns of Adelheid's arrival. He is also informed that the landowner Senden is trying to win her affection.

=== Act II ===
==== Scene 1 ====
The colonel is asked by Senden to stand as a candidate for his party. He is the person who will tip the scales and help them to victory. The colonel agrees, so he will be Oldendorf's direct opponent in the upcoming election.

==== Scene 2 ====
Many guests have gathered for the evening reception at which the colonel's candidacy is to be proclaimed. Among them is Schmock, an employee of the "Coriolan". However, he is rudely sent away by his editor Blumenberg. When he meets Bolz, he asks him if he can't offer him a job at the rival paper, the "Union", and when Bolz wonders about this, Schmock says: "Why are you worrying about that? I learned from Blumenberg to write in all directions. I wrote left and right again. I can write in any direction."

While Senden and his people are counting on the popularity of the colonel, who is to give another speech in the evening, Bolz and Kämpe sit down near the wine merchant Piepenbrink, who has come with his family. Piepenbrink is considered an influential elector who can influence a handful of other electors. Bolz and Kämpe praise the wine merchant's wines excessively loudly. He is very pleased about this and invites them to his table. Piepenbrink is already booked for Senden's party, but lets Bolz tell him how Oldendorf once saved his life. When Senden sees Bolz sidling up to Piepenbrink, he wants to intervene. However, this backfires. Piepenbrink comes to the defence of his new acquaintance and is furious at Senden's behaviour.

=== Act III ===
The close election is concluded in Oldendorf's favour. The votes that came from the wine merchant Piepenbrink and the electors influenced by him were decisive. The colonel is a bitter loser, a marriage between Oldendorf and Ida now seems to have become completely impossible.

Meanwhile, Adelheid tries to find a good solution to the conflict. Bellmaus comes to her rescue. He has been told by the drunken Schmock about the plot that Senden and the "Coriolan" have hatched against Oldendorf in order to make him unacceptable to the colonel.

Meanwhile, the colonel receives messages from citizens thanking him for his services. The colonel suspects that this is mainly mockery in view of his election defeat and it is difficult to convince him otherwise.

=== Act IV ===
==== Scene 1 ====
In conversation with Adelheid, the colonel reaffirms that a marriage between Ida and Oldendorf is out of the question. Apart from the electoral defeat, this is mainly due to the fact that the colonel has problems with Oldendorf's being a journalist: "He may be a deputy, he may be better suited to it than I; that he is a newspaper writer, that separates us."

Adelheid makes sure that the colonel listens to her conversation with Schmock, who once again reports on Senden's plot.

==== Scene 2 ====
In the editorial office of the "Union" they are celebrating Oldendorf's victory. Meanwhile, the latest issue of the "Coriolan" arrives, stating that the "Union" has changed hands for 30,000 Taler. There is a little confusion about the identity of the buyer. At first it is assumed that the people around the "Coriolan" bought the paper in order to bring a competitor into line with their own political line. In the end, however, it becomes clear that Adelheid has bought the paper, and not only that, she has bequeathed it to Konrad Bolz, who will now determine the fate of the "Union". Konrad then immediately proposes marriage, which she accepts. When the colonel storms in and asks who he has before him, she answers with the last words in the play: "The bride of a journalist!"

Oldendorf had willingly resigned his editorship during the confusion over the new ownership, which is the prerequisite for a reconciliation with the colonel and now finally makes possible his union with Ida.

== Publication ==
- Die Journalisten at Zeno.org
- Die Journalisten. Lustspiel in 4 Akten. With an afterword edited by Oliver Ruf. Hannover: Wehrhahn Verlag 2011.
- The Journalists at archive.org

== Literature ==
- Philipp Böttcher: Gustav Freytag - Constellations of Realism, Berlin/New York: De Gruyter 2018. ISBN 978-3-11-053930-1.

== Film adaptation ==
- 1961: The Journalists (television film); director: Fritz Umgelter; with Alfred Schieske (Retired Colonel von Berg), Ursula Kopp (Ida von Berg), Dagmar Altrichter (Adelheid Runeck), Hans Beuthner (landowner von Senden), Heinz Weiss (Prof. Oldendorf), Karl Walter Diess (Dr. Konrad Bolz), Andreas Blum (Bellmaus), Hans E. Schons (Blumenberg), Gerhard Just (Piepenbrink), Käthe Itter (Lotte Piepenbrink), Angela Pschigode (Bertha Piepenbrink), Otto Brüggemann (print shop owner Henning) and others.
