= Heinrich Julian Schmidt =

German journalist and historian of literature

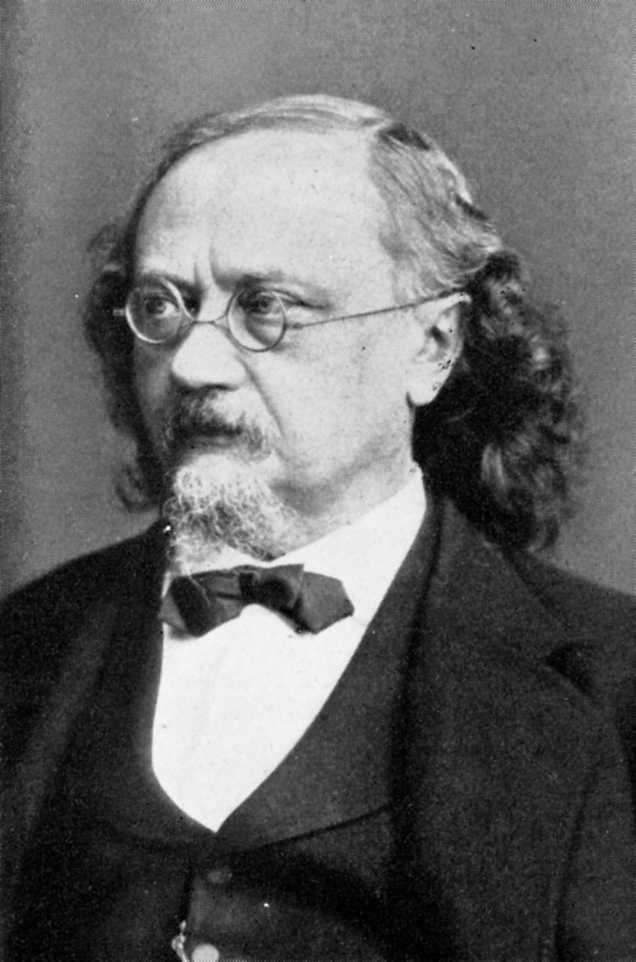
Heinrich Julian Schmidt.

Heinrich Julian Schmidt (March 7, 1818 – March 27, 1886) was a German journalist and historian of literature.

== Biography ==
He was born in Marienwerder (today Kwidzyn) in West Prussia. After studying history and philosophy at the University of Königsberg, he was appointed in 1842 to a mastership in the Luisenstadt Realschule in Berlin. From 1848 to 1861, he owned and edited Die Grenzboten conjointly with Gustav Freytag.

In 1861, he moved to Berlin where he was editor-in-chief of the Berliner allgemeine Zeitung, and after that dedicated himself to literary history. In 1878 was rewarded for the journalistic services rendered to the government, by a pension from the emperor William I. He died at Berlin on March 27, 1886.

Julian Schmidt's principal contributions to literary history are:

- Geschichte der Romantik im Zeitalter der Revolution und Restauration (History of Romanticism during the times of Revolution and Restoration; 1848)
- Geschichte der deutschen Nationalliteratur im 19. Jahrhundert (History of German national literature in the 19th century; 1853) His numerous critical articles for Die Grenzboten formed the basis for this. The 5th ed., revised and enlarged, appeared under the title Geschichte der deutschen Litteratur seit Lessings Tod (History of German literature since Lessing's death; 1865–67).
- Geschichte des geistigen Lebens in Deutschland von Leibniz bis auf Lessings Tod (History of Germany's intellectual life from Leibniz until Lessing's death; 1861–1863)

The latter two works subsequently appeared as Geschichte der deutschen Literatur von Leibniz bis auf unsere Zeit (History of German literature from Leibniz until modern times; 4 vols., 1886–1896). Schmidt also wrote a Geschichte der französischen Literatur seit der Revolution (History of French literature since the Revolution; 1857), Uebersicht der englischen Litteratur im 19. Jahrhundert (Outline of English literature of the 19th century; 1859); Schiller und seine Zeitgenossen (Schiller and his contemporaries; 1859); the collections of essays Bilder aus dem geistigen Leben unserer Zeit (Snapshots from the intellectual life of our time; 1870–74), and Porträts aus dem 19. Jahrhundert (Portraits from the nineteenth century; 1878)

== An evaluation from the New International Encyclopædia ==
Julian Schmidt exercised more influence upon the period of German intellectual life in which he worked than has been accorded him. As a critic in journals and periodicals, his discussions comprised the entire scope of intellectual life in science, arts, and politics. The forte of his criticism, especially in regard to works of art, lay in an almost infallible instinct to perceive truth, power, and sterling worth, which quality enabled him to teach his contemporaries not to borrow their views of things from remote chains of thought, but to trust the spontaneity of their own feelings.
