= Georgiana Harcourt =

Georgiana Charlotte Frances Malcolm
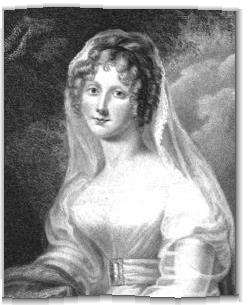
- "a distinguished female"
- Born: Georgiana Charlotte Frances Harcourt; 1807; Dalston, Cumberland, England
- Died: 29 October 1886 (aged 79); Sloane Street, Chelsea, London, England
- Occupations: correspondent and translator
- Spouse: Major-General George Alexander Malcolm C.B.
- Parent(s): Edward Venables-Vernon-Harcourt; Lady Anne Leveson-Gower

Georgiana Charlotte Frances Harcourt (1807 – 29 October 1886) was the daughter of the Archbishop of York. Her correspondence has been published, but she is primarily known for the novels of Gustav Freytag and the theological works she translated from German originals. Her husband, General Malcolm, had a distinguished career in the British army.

== Biography ==
Harcourt was born shortly before her baptism on 27 July 1807 in Dalston, Cumberland. She was the youngest daughter of 16 children of Edward Venables-Vernon-Harcourt, the incumbent Bishop of Carlisle, and his wife, Lady Anne Leveson-Gower. She would later live at Bishopthorpe Palace, the official residence of the Archbishop of York.

On 12 September 1835, when Princess Victoria visited Harewood House in Yorkshire with her mother, the Duchess of Kent, she attended the local church service. Georgiana's father preached the sermon at the local church, and many local dignitaries attended from Leeds and the surrounding area. On entering the church, it was Henry Lascelles, the 4th Earl of Harewood who accompanied the Duchess of Kent, but the princess, and future Queen, was accompanied by Georgiana.

Harcourt corresponded with the Duke of Wellington between 1838 and 1849 (before and after her 1845 marriage) and with Sydney Smith within two years of his death. She was amongst the "most favoured of his fair correspondents". Sydney had been a clergyman under her father, the Archbishop. He writes to her in a carefree style:

"What a charming existence! To live in the midst of holy people; to know that nothing profane can approach you; to be certain that a Dissenter can no more be found in the palace than a snake in Ireland, or ripe fruit in Scotland. To have your society strong and undiluted by the laity to bid adieu to human learning; to feast on the Canons and to revel in the Thirty-nine articles! Happy Georgiana!"

== Family ==
She married on 4 December 1845 at Bishopthorpe, York to Major-General George Alexander Malcolm C.B., son of General Sir John Malcolm and Isabella Charlotte (second daughter of Sir Alexander Campbell).

Georgiana's husband had been given £500, made Lieutenant-Colonel and a Companion of the Order of the Bath in 1842 after bringing the Treaty of Nanking back to England. He was also given money to cover his travelling expenses from China and a larger sum to cover his expenses on his return.

Georgiana died 29 October 1886 at their home in Sloan Street, Chelsea, London.

Her husband led the 105th Regiment of Foot (Madras Light Infantry) from 10 March 1866. In 1881, General Malcolm was the Colonel of the King's Own Yorkshire Light Infantry, second battalion, a post he held until 1890.

== Major works ==
- Luther's Letters to Women, Martin Luther, 1865, ed. Karl Zimmermann Trans. G. Malcolm ISBN 1430498641 Reprinted 2007
- Old German Theology a hundred years before the Reformation With a preface by Martin Luther. Translated from the German by Mrs. Malcolm 1854
- Pictures of German Life in the XVth, XVIth, and XVIIth centuries ... Translated from the original by Gustav Freytag and Georgiana Malcolm
- The Lost Manuscript Translated by Mrs. Malcolm. Novel by Gustav Freytag (1865)
- Debit and Credit Novel by Gustav Freytag translated by Georgiana Malcolm (1857)
- Our Forefathers Translated by Mrs. Malcolm Novel by Gustav Freytag (1873)
