= Our Forefathers =

Novel series by Gustav Freytag

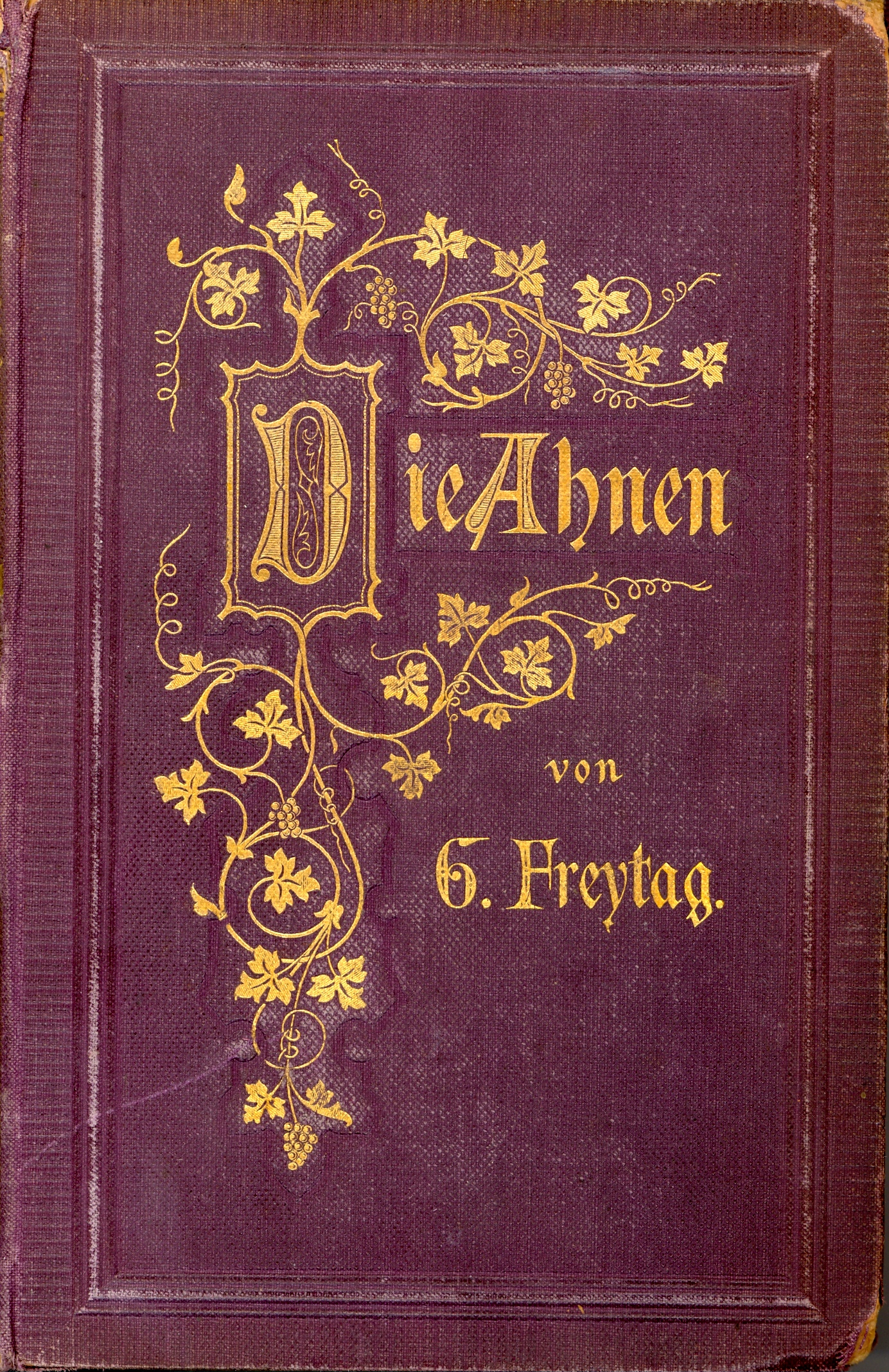
- Cover of an 1874 edition of volume three
- Ingo; Ingraban; Das Nest der Zaunkönige; Die Brüder vom deutschen Hause; Marcus König; Die Geschwister; Aus einer kleinen Stadt; Schluß der Ahnen
- Author: Gustav Freytag
- Original title: Die Ahnen
- Translator: Georgiana Malcolm
- Country: Germany
- Language: German
- Genre: historical fiction
- Publisher: S. Hirzel Verlag
- Published: 1872–1880

Our Forefathers (German: Die Ahnen) is a series of historical novels by the German writer Gustav Freytag, consisting of eight stories originally published in six volumes by S. Hirzel Verlag in 1872–1880. The stories span over 1500 years, from around 350 to the second half of the 19th century, and each novel is about a German family and the time in which it lives. The novels were written shortly after the unification of Germany, which Freytag supported but was ambivalent toward in practice, and explore German national identity.

== Novels ==
1. Ingo (1872)
2. Ingraban (1872)
3. Das Nest der Zaunkönige (1873)
4. Die Brüder vom deutschen Hause (1874)
5. Marcus König (1876)
6. Die Geschwister (1878)
7. Aus einer kleinen Stadt (1880)
8. Schluß der Ahnen (1880)

Ingo and Ingraban were published in English translation by Georgiana Malcolm in 1873, with Our Forefathers as the English title of the series.

== Adaptations ==
Ingo has been the basis for three operas, composed by Georg Wilhelm Rauchenecker (1893), Philipp Bartholomé Rüfer (1896) and Bernhard Scholz (1898).
