= Wrocław central bus station =

Bus station in Wrocław, Poland

Dworzec Wrocław
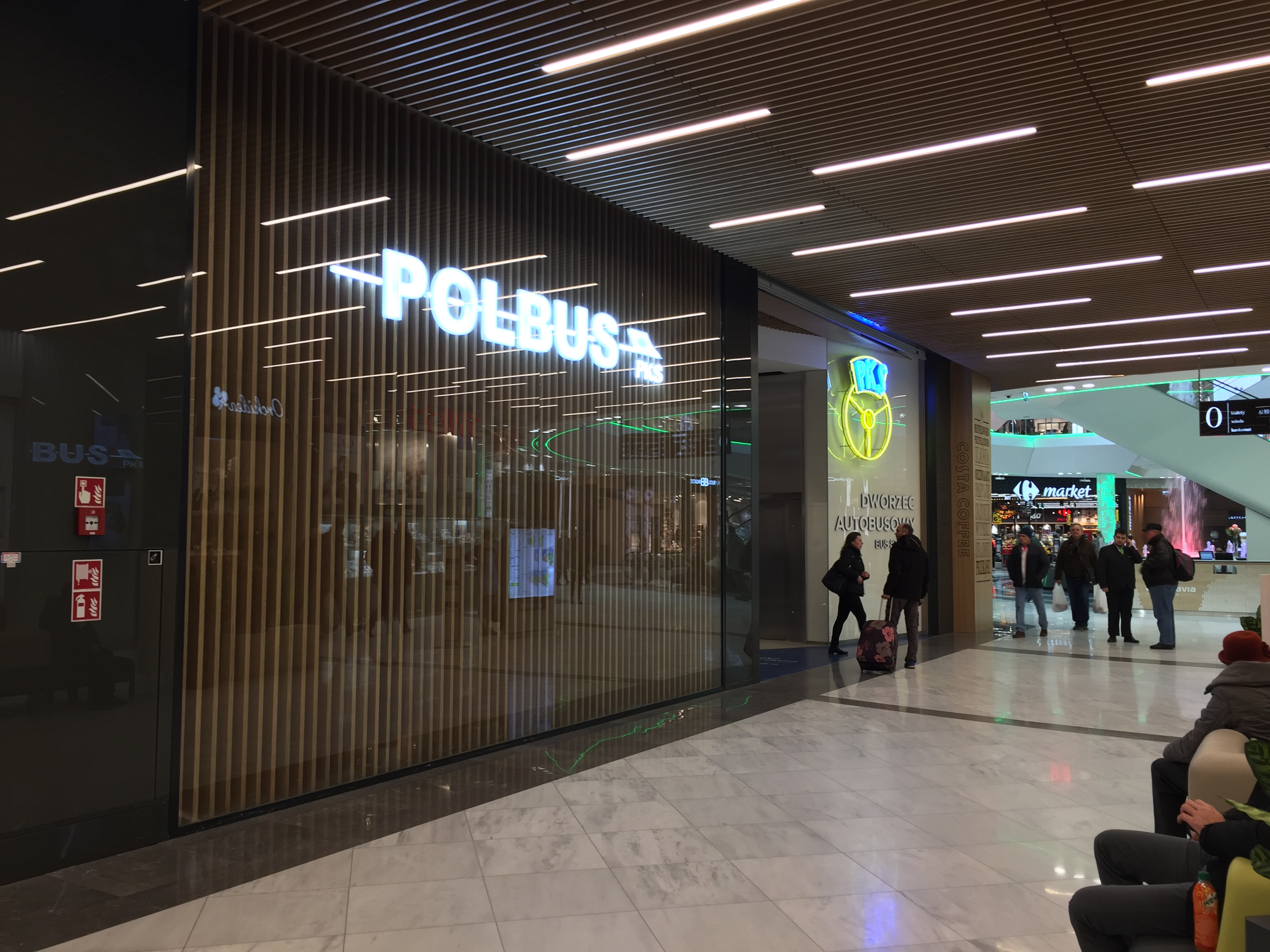
- The entrance to the station

General information
- Other names: Dworzec Autobusowy
- Location: Sucha 1, Huby, Wrocław; Poland
- Coordinates: 51°06′N 17°02′E
- System: Bus station
- Operator: Polbus-PKS
- Platforms: 14

Other information
- Website: dworzecwroclaw.pl/

History
- Opened: November 7, 2017; 8 years ago
Location

Wrocław central bus station (Polish: Dworzec Wrocław) is a bus station in the Huby housing estate in Wrocław, Poland, located on floor -2 of the Wroclavia shopping center. It is adjacent to the Wrocław Główny railway station.

It was opened on November 7, 2017. It is the only PKS bus station in Poland to be built underground.

== History ==
It is the second location and third building of the main bus station in the city since the 1960s.

Until 1994, the bus station was located at 3 May Constitution Square, where the Silver Tower Center currently stands. Construction of the new station began in 1974, south of the main train station, in the place of a park. The new building on Sucha Street was commissioned in 1994, and after eight years construction of the office building began on the old site.

In the area of the station in Sucha Street, Wroclavia shopping center was built; at that time the station was moved to a temporary building in Joannitów Street. In 2014, the station on Sucha Street was demolished and the construction of the shopping center began, while at the same time, the bus station was moved to a temporary place in the area, in the courtyard of the Railway Directorate on Joannitów Street. The mall was opened in October 2017, and the new station was opened several days later.

The temporary station, which is still used by some carriers, has not been closed down.
