= Debit and Credit =

Novel by Gustav Freytag

- The title page of an 1892 edition, from the Library of Congress collections
- Author: Gustav Freytag
- Original title: Soll und Haben
- Translator: Georgiana Harcourt
- Language: German
- Genre: Bildungsroman
- Set in: Silesia
- Publication place: North German Confederation
- Media type: Social novel

Debit and Credit (German: Soll und Haben, 1855) is a novel in six volumes by Gustav Freytag. It was one of the most popular and widely read German novels of the 19th century.

The novel has been described as a “colonial novel”, an example of the broader trend of German nationalist Ostmarkenliteratur ("Eastern March literataure", a name of the area in terms of its geographic relation to the 'centre', suggesting medieval phenomena such as the Saxon Eastern March) concerning Prussian and German-ruled Greater Poland region, related to popular German colonial narratives. 'Reinventing Poland as German colonial territory' according to Kristin Kopp. It develops the idea of "Polnische Wirtschaft" as inferior to putative German industriousness.

The novel concerns a Polish uprising against German colonization in 'Prussian Poland', where German settlers displaced the Polish inhabitants. Freytag unequivocally endorses it, espousing ardent Anti-Polish sentiment and views German racial superiority, stating that "there is an old warfare between [Germans] and the Slavonic tribes; and [Germans] feel with pride that culture, industry, and credit are [their] side. Whatever the Polish proprietors around [them] may now be—and there are many rich and intelligent men among them—every dollar that [these proprietors] can spend, they have made, directly or indirectly, by German intelligence. Their wild flocks are improved by [German] breeds; [who] erect the machinery that fills their spirit-casks."

It has been Zeitroman, literally 'novel of the times' or "social novel".

It represents the mercantile or bourgeois class, the nobility, and the Jews:

- The bourgeois Schröter family represents Freytag's view of the ideal bourgeois type, invested in order, honesty, and solid virtue.
- The noble Rothsattel family represents the old nobility, who try to preserve their privileges in a changing society. Their struggle to avoid their impending financial ruin portrays this dynamic.
- The Jewish Ehrenthal family are money-lenders and speculators. Veitel Itzig is a criminal employee of the family.

It has also been described as a bildungsroman, with Anton Wohlfart as the emerging hero. As a result of his manifold experiences, he develops a putatively sober and virtuous outlook (Weltanschauung).

In 1977, the novel came close to being filmed by Rainer Werner Fassbinder, but after a debate about its alleged antisemitic content this project was abandoned.

It was translated into English as Debit and Credit by Georgiana Malcolm née Harcourt in 1857.

== Plot ==
After the death of his father, young Anton Wohlfart begins an apprenticeship in the office of the merchant T. O. Schröter in Breslau. Anton quickly succeeds through honest and diligent work, achieving a proper bourgeois existence. He has a variety of experiences with the Schröter family and also with the noble family of the Rothsattels. He later becomes involved with the liquidation of the estate of the Rothsattel family, an obvious symbol of the decline of the nobility and of its clash with emergent capitalist forces.

Anton has repeated interactions with two other young men, the Jew Veitel Itzig, whom he had known already in his home town, Ostrava, and a young nobleman, Herr von Fink, who is a co-worker in the Schröter firm.
