= Die Grenzboten =

- Editor: Ignaz Kuranda, Gustav Freytag, Julian Schmidt, Georg Cleinow, Johannes Grunow
- Categories: national liberal magazine
- Frequency: weekly or fortnightly
- First issue: 1841
- Final issue: 1922

Die Grenzboten was a German language, national liberal magazine published from 1841 to 1922, sometimes weekly and sometimes fortnightly.

== History ==
The journal was founded in 1841 by Ignaz Kuranda in Brussels, who was its editor until 1848. From 1842, Die Grenzboten was published by the publishing house of F. W. Grunow in Leipzig, later in Berlin. In 1848, Gustav Freytag and Julian Schmidt took over as editors. Freytag held this post until 1861 and again from 1867 to 1870; Schmidt until 1861. They made the magazine, not least through many of their own contributions, the most influential mouthpiece of the national-liberal bourgeoisie up to the founding of the German Reich in 1871. In 1870, Grunow became the sole owner and Hans Blum was in charge of editing until 1878, when Johannes Grunow took over the publication in conjunction with Gustav Wustmann. From that point, the orientation of the magazine changed from a purely liberal to a more conservative one. In 1849 Die Grenzboten was banned in Austria. From 1856 to 1870 and 1878 to 1890, Moritz Busch was one of its most productive editors.

Its subtitle was initially Blätter für Deutschland und Belgien ("Papers for Germany and Belgium"). This changed in 1842 to Eine deutsche Revue ("A German Revue"), in 1844 to Zeitschrift für Politik und Literatur ("Journal for Politics and Literature") and, in 1871, to Zeitschrift für Politik, Literatur und Kunst ("Journal for Politics, Literature and Art").

The journal was important because, through it, Schmidt and Freytag developed the theory of literary realism. In the decade from 1848 they were decisive influencers of literary discourse in Germany.

== Literature ==
- Werner Fritz: Die Grenzboten: aus der Geschichte einer achtzigjährigen Zeitschrift nationaler Bedeutung. In: Die Grenzboten, 81. Jg., 1922, Vol. 1, pp. 448–452. (digitalised, SUUB Bremen)
- Sibylle Obenaus: Literarische und politische Zeitschriften 1848–1880. Metzler, Stuttgart 1987 (Sammlung Metzler, 229), ISBN 3-476-10229-7, pp. 38–43.
