= Wroclavia =

Building complex in Wrocław, Poland

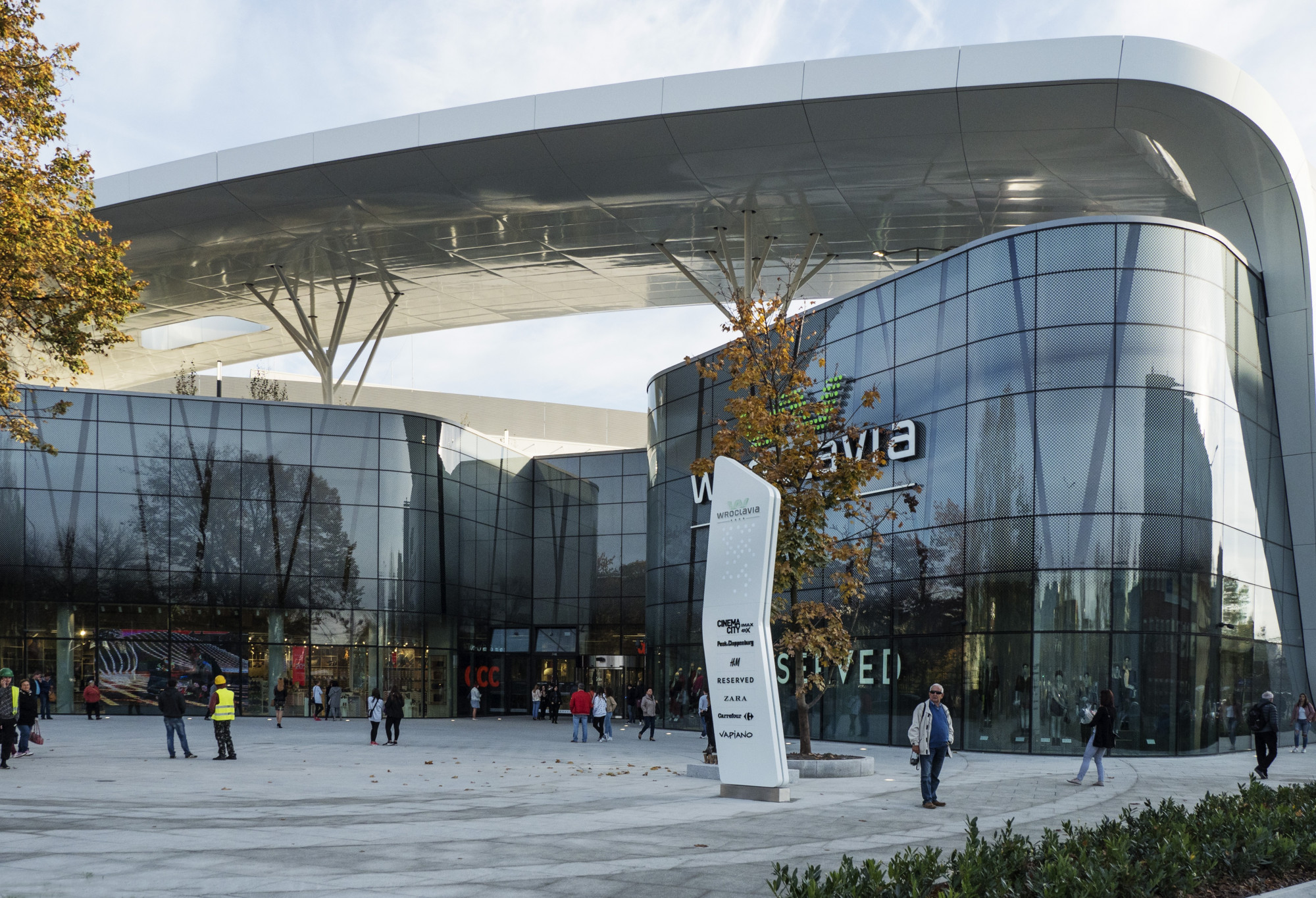
- Address: Sucha 1, 50-086 Wrocław
- Opened: October 18, 2017
- Owner: Unibail-Rodamco-Westfield
- Website: westfield.com/poland/wroclavia

Wroclavia (Polish pronunciation: [vrɔt͡sˈlavja]) is a shopping, entertainment, and office center located in the Huby district of Wrocław, Poland. It opened on October 18, 2017, and is situated next to the Wrocław Główny railway station. The center features a variety of retail stores, restaurants, and entertainment facilities, as well as modern office spaces. The Wrocław central bus station is located on level -2 of the gallery. Wroclavia won the International Property Award for Best Retail Architecture in the World in 2018-2019, recognizing its innovative design. The center has become Wrocław's most visited shopping destination.

== Background ==
The center is situated on the former Wrocław Pond Fields. It is owned by Unibail-Rodamco-Westfield and features more than 180 stores, including restaurants, cafés, service points, a Cinema City movie theater with 20 rooms (including IMAX, 4DX, and 3 VIP rooms), a 24-hour fitness club, and a children's playroom.
