= Huby, Wrocław =

District in Wrocław, Poland

Huby
- District of Wrocław
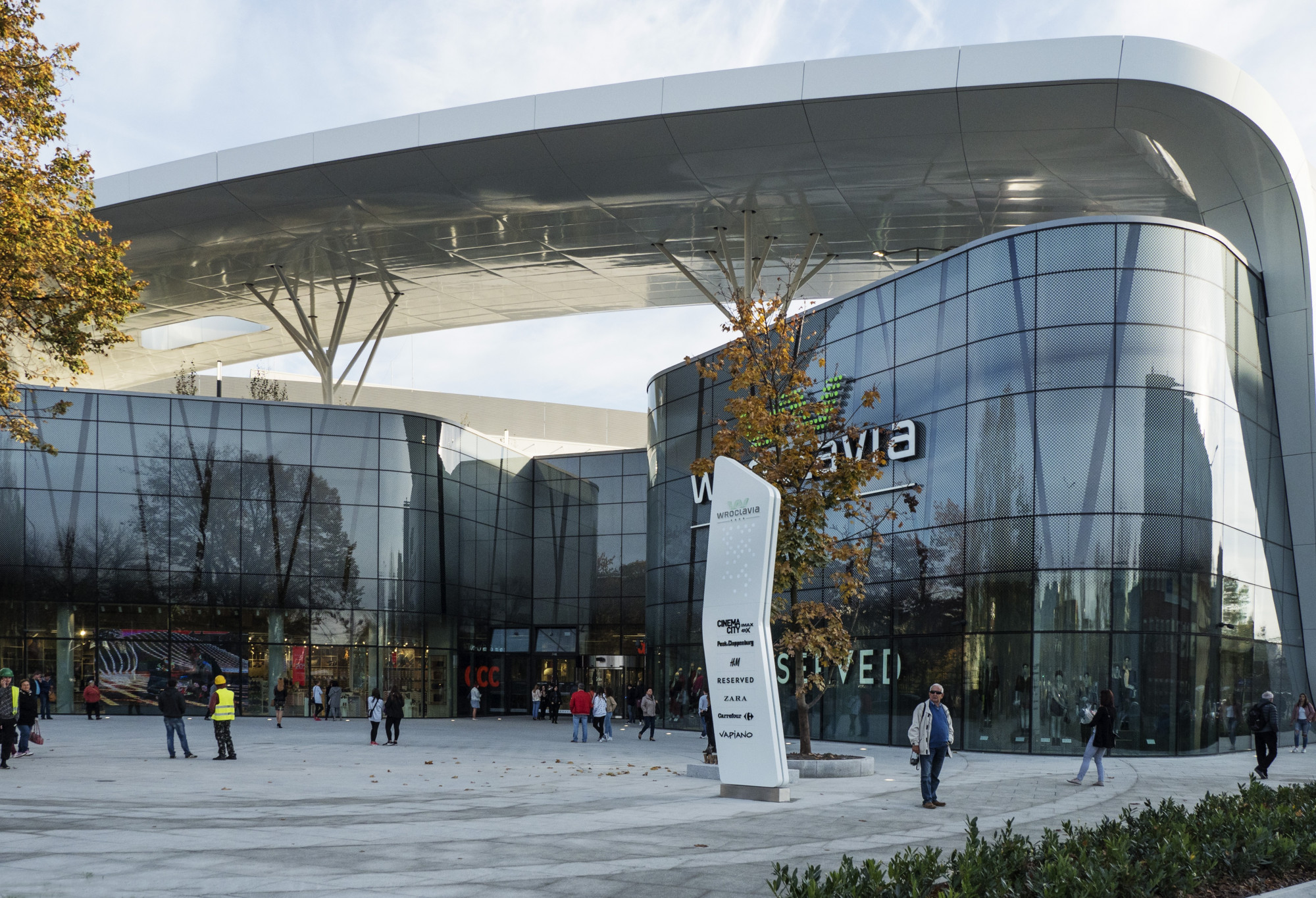
- Wroclavia shopping mall

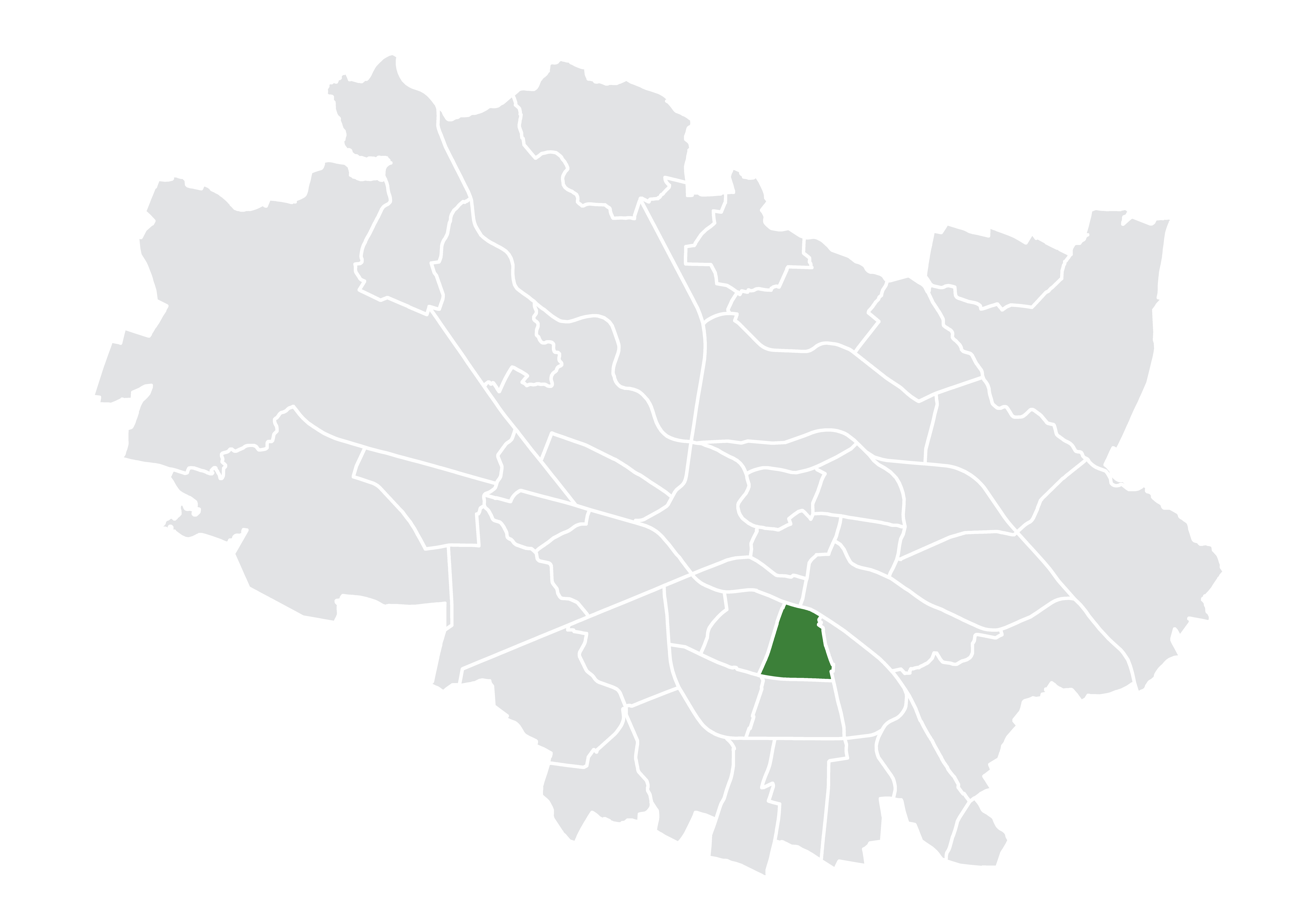
- Location of Huby within Wrocław
- Country: Poland
- Voivodeship: Lower Silesian
- County/City: Wrocław
- First mentioned: 1346
- Incorporated into the city: 1868
- Established the modern-day district: 1991

Population (2022)
  - Total: 18,727
- Time zone: UTC+1 (CET)
  - Summer (DST): UTC+2 (CEST)
- Area code: +48 71
- Website: Osiedle Huby

Huby (Polish pronunciation: [ˈxubɨ], German: Huben, [ˈhuːbən]) is a district in Wrocław, Poland, located in the southern part of the city. It was established in the territory of the former Krzyki district.

Huby's most important objects is the city's Wrocław Główny railway station and main bus station, integrated with the Wroclavia shopping center.

== History ==
The earliest record of Huby dates back to 1346. The area has a history dating back to the Middle Ages, but its current role in the city was established in modern times. Architecturally, the estate is divided into two parts: the Old Huby, located between the railroad tracks and Kamienna Street, where pre-World War II kamienice dominate; and the area between Kamienna Street and Armii Krajowej Avenue, known as the New Huby, which was built in the 1970s.

Initially a village, the settlement was incorporated into Breslau (today's Wrocław) in 1868.

In 1991, after reforms in the administrative division of Wrocław, Huby became one of the city's 48 districts. In 2004, the neighborhood of Glinianki was incorporated into Huby.
