= Gustav Freytag =

German writer (1816–1895)

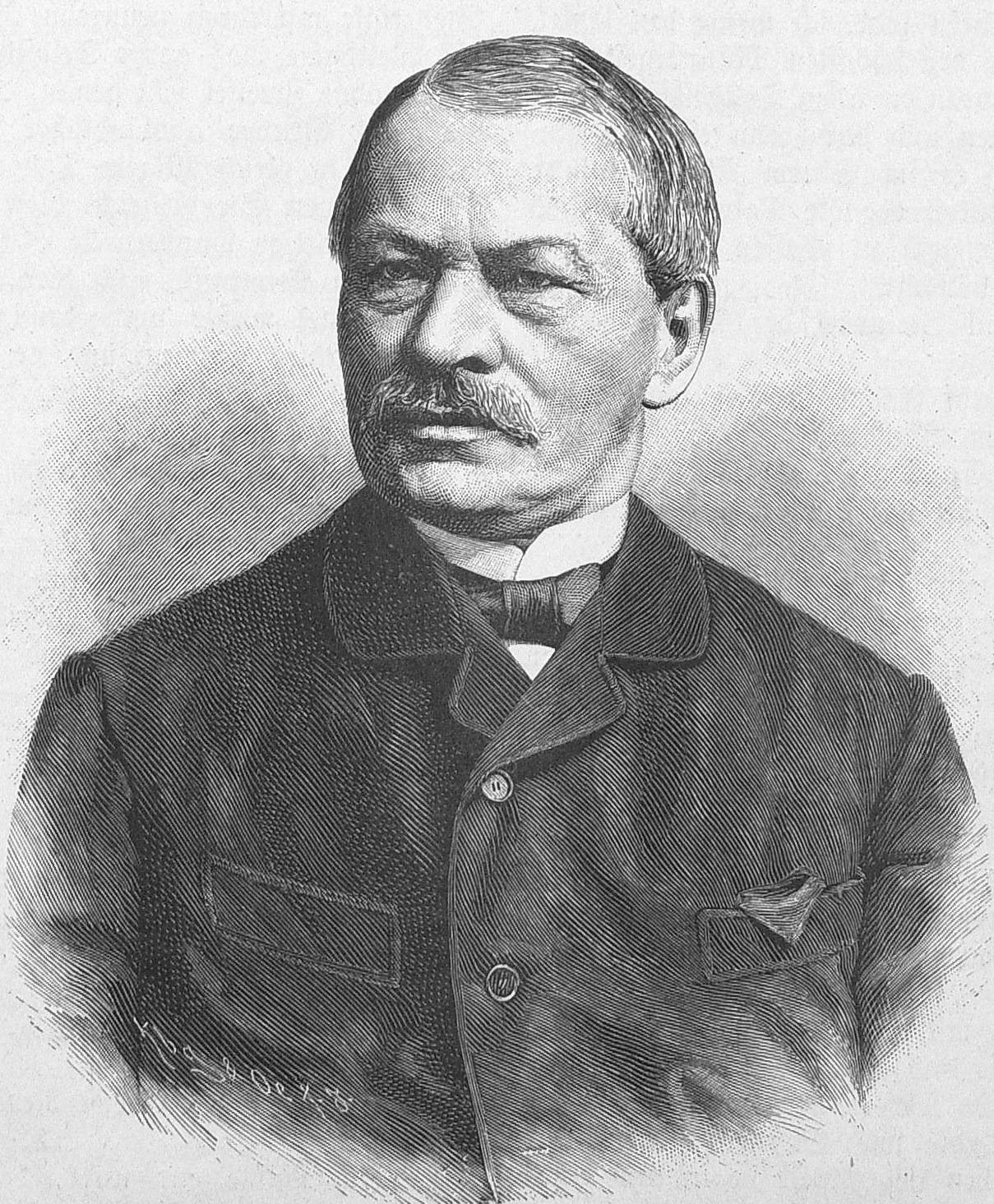
- Gustav Freytag, from Die Gartenlaube (1886)
- Born: 13 July 1816; Kreuzburg, Kingdom of Prussia
- Died: 30 April 1895 (aged 78); Wiesbaden, Germany
- Occupations: Novelist, playwright

Gustav Freytag (German: [ˈfʁaɪˌtaːk]; 13 July 1816 – 30 April 1895) was a German novelist and playwright.

== Life ==
Freytag was born in Kreuzburg (Kluczbork) in Silesia. After attending the school at Oels (Oleśnica), he studied philology at the universities of Breslau (Wrocław) and Berlin, and in 1838 received his degree with a dissertation titled De initiis poeseos scenicae apud Germanos (Über die Anfänge der dramatischen Poesie bei den Germanen, English: On the Beginnings of Dramatic Poetry among the Germans). He became member of the student corps Borussia zu Breslau.

In 1839, he settled in Breslau, as Privatdozent in German language and literature, but devoted his principal attention to writing for the stage, achieving considerable success with the comedy drama Die Brautfahrt, oder Kunz von der Rosen (1844). This was followed by a volume of unimportant poems, In Breslau (1845), and the dramas Die Valentine (1846) and Graf Waldemar (1847). He at last attained a prominent position by his comedy, The Journalists (1852), one of the best German comedies of the 19th century.

In 1847, he moved to Berlin, and in the following year took over, in conjunction with Julian Schmidt, the editorship of Die Grenzboten, a weekly journal which, founded in 1841, now became the leading organ of German and Austrian liberalism. Freytag helped to conduct it until 1861, and again from 1867 until 1870, when for a short time he edited a new periodical, Im neuen Reich. In 1863 he developed what is known as Freytag's Pyramid.

Freytag's Pyramid

Freytag died in Wiesbaden on 30 April 1895.

== Works ==
=== Debit and Credit ===
Freytag's literary fame was made universal by the publication in 1855 of his novel, Soll und Haben (Debit and Credit), which was translated into almost all European languages. It was translated into English by Georgiana Harcourt in 1857.

It was hailed as one of the best German novels and praised for its sturdy but unexaggerated realism. Its main purpose is the recommendation of the German middle class as the soundest element in the nation, but it also has a more directly patriotic intention in the contrast it draws between the supposedly homely virtues of the German, while presenting in negative light Poles and Jews. In the novel a Jewish merchant is presented as a villain and threat to Germany. German colonists are presented as "superior" to "wild", "inferior" and "uncivilized" Poles who are also shown sometimes in racist terms. The novel affirmed the claim of German "masters" to seize the land of the "weaker race" justified by supposedly "superior" German culture. The novel applied blatant racism to Slavs while focusing on Poles; the author stated that Poles have "no culture" and are unable to create civilization. Freytag also claimed that Poles will only become proper human beings through German rule and colonization, and giving up their language and culture. Soll und Haben set an example for a body of colonial literature about the "eastern marches" and also started a public reinterpretation of the Ostsiedlung, which was now presented as historical mission of the Germans (Kulturträger), legitimizing continued occupation of Polish areas and suppressions of Polish population.

=== The Lost Manuscript ===
At the duke's request, Freytag was attached to the staff of the Crown Prince of Prussia in the Franco-Prussian War of 1870–71, and was present at the Battles of Wörth and Sedan. Before this, he had published another novel, The Lost Manuscript (Die verlorene Handschrift) (1864), in which he endeavoured to do for German university life what Soll und Haben had done for commercial life. The hero is a young German professor, who is so wrapped up in his search for a manuscript by Tacitus that he is oblivious to an impending tragedy in his domestic life. The book was, however, less successful than its predecessor.

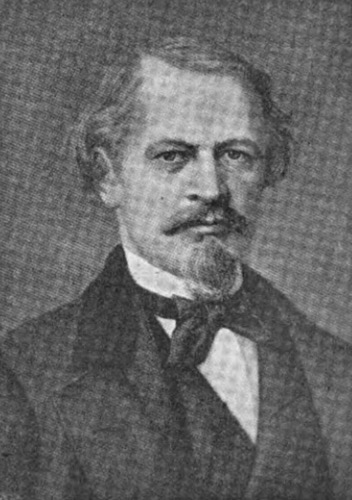
Freytag in June 1895 edition of The Bookman (New York City)

=== Bilder aus der deutschen Vergangenheit and Our Forefathers ===
Between 1859 and 1867, Freytag published in five volumes Bilder aus der deutschen Vergangenheit, a work on popular lines, illustrating the history and manners of Germany. In 1872, he began a work with a similar patriotic purpose, Our Forefathers (Die Ahnen), a series of historical romances in which he unfolds the history of a German family from the earliest times to the middle of the 19th century. This series comprises the following novels:

1. Ingo und Ingraban (1872)
2. Das Nest der Zaunkönige (1874)
3. Die Brüder vom deutschen Hause (1875)
4. Marcus König (1876)
5. Die Geschwister (1878)
6. Aus einer kleinen Stadt (1880).

=== Other works ===
Freytag's other works include:

- Die Technik des Dramas (1863), in which he explained a system for dramatic structure, later named Freytag's Pyramid. Published in an English translation as Freytag's Technique of the Drama: An Exposition of Dramatic Composition and Art in 1894.
- a biography of the Baden statesman Karl Mathy (1869)
- an autobiography (Erinnerungen aus meinen Leben, 1887)
- his Gesammelte Aufsätze, chiefly reprinted from the Grenzboten (1888); Der Kronprinz und die deutsche Kaiserkrone; and Erinnerungsblätter (1889)
- a biography of Martin Luther 1896

=== Political activity ===
Freytag authored anti-Polish pamphlets. In 1863 Freytag commented that if Poles ever get free from Russian rule in Russian Partition, then Germany should conquer them, stating "We shall make their land German" and that the Poles are facing not the German government but "the entire German nation". Being a native of a province which in his mind owed everything to the Kingdom of Prussia, he was an earnest champion of Prussian hegemony over Germany. His powerful advocacy of this idea in his Grenzboten gained him the friendship of the Duke of Saxe-Coburg-Gotha, whose neighbor he had become, on acquiring the estate of Siebleben near Gotha.

=== Complete works ===
Freytag's Gesammelte Werke were published in 22 volumes, at Leipzig (1886–1888); his Vermischte Aufsatze have been edited by E. Elster, autobiography mentioned above, the lives by C. Alberti (Leipzig, 1890) and F. Seiler (Leipzig, 1898).
