= Barash =

Barash is a surname. Notable people with the surname include:

- Brandon Barash (born 1979), American actor
- David P. Barash, American psychologist
- Joshua Barash, American photographer
- Amanuel Barash

== See also ==
- Blush (2015 film), originally titled "Barash"
- Barash(Wally), the hero of the animated series Kikoriki
- Sy Barash Regatta
- Barasch
