= Barasch =

Barasch is a Jewish Ashkenazi surname, a Hebrew acronymic one בר"ש - from the Hebrew form: Ben Rabbi Sh... (son of Rabbi Shmuel, Shlomo, Shimon or other person whose name begins with 'Sh'). Notable people with the surname include:

- George Barasch (1910–2013), American labor leader
- Iuliu Barasch (1815–1863), Romanian doctor and public figure
- Jack Barasch (1918–1984), known as Jack Barry, television personality
- Lynne Barasch (died 2024), American children's illustrator and writer
- Marc Ian Barasch (born 1949), American writer and producer

== See also ==
- Barasch Brothers' Department Store
- Barash
