= Cathedral of St. Mary Magdalene, Wrocław =

Church in Wrocław, Poland

Coordinates: 51°06′34″N 17°02′05″E

Cathedral of St. Mary Magdalene
- Katedra św. Marii Magdaleny
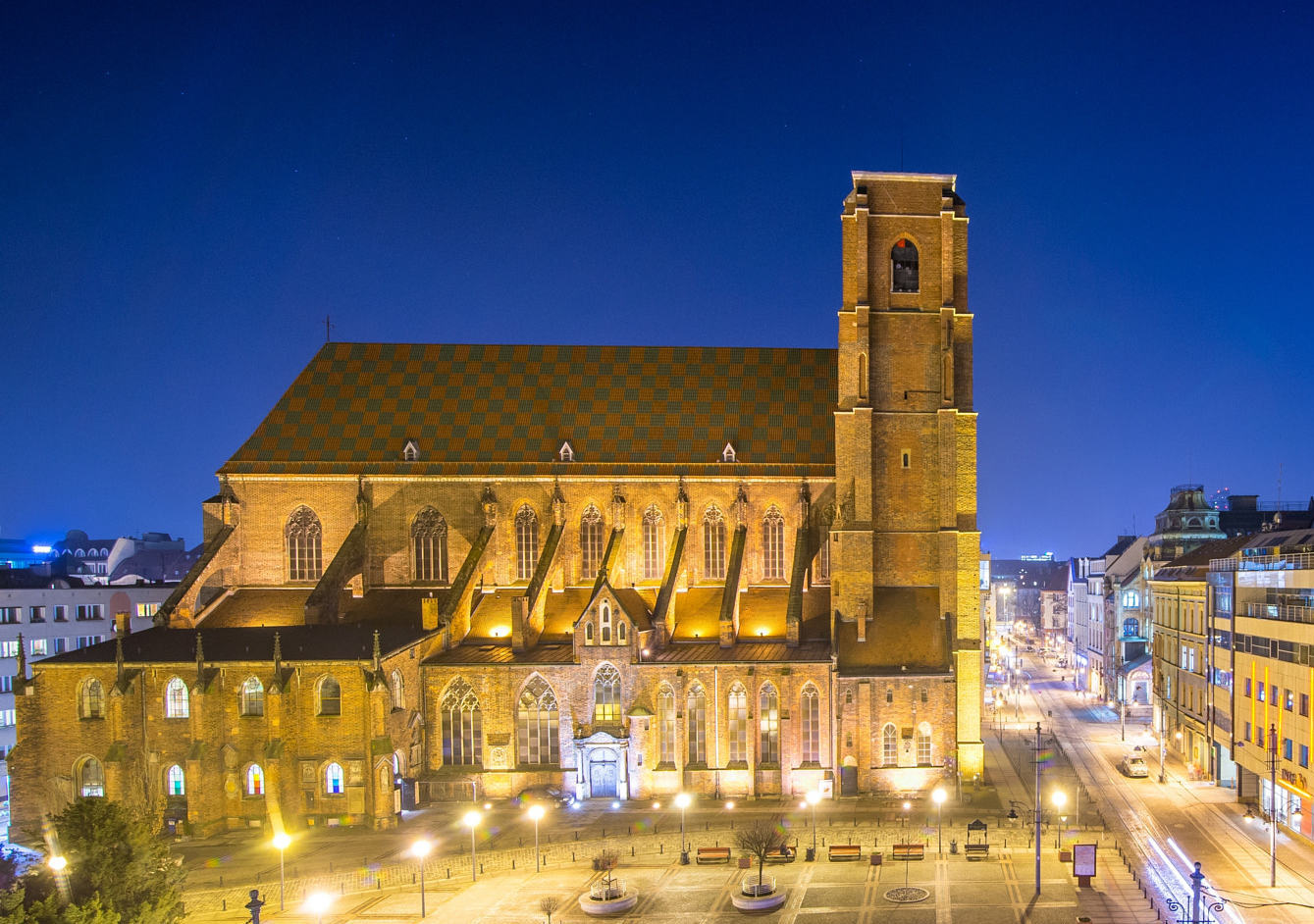
- View from Szewska street

Religion
- Affiliation: Old Catholic
- District: Old Town

Location
- Location: Wrocław, Poland
- Interactive map of Cathedral of St. Mary Magdalene

Architecture
- Style: Romanesque, Brick Gothic
- Completed: before 15th century
- Materials: Brick

Historic Monument of Poland
- Designated: 1994-09-08
- Part of: Wrocław – historic city center
- Reference no.: M.P. 1994 nr 50 poz. 425

Cathedral of St. Mary Magdalene (Polish: Katedra św. Marii Magdaleny we Wrocławiu) in Wrocław, Poland, is a gothic church located between Szewska and Łaciarska street close to the central market square, established in the 13th century. The church is named after Jesus' companion Mary Magdalene. It serves as a cathedral of the Polish Catholic Church led by Piotr Mikołajczak. Along with the Old Town of Wrocław, it is listed as a Historic Monument of Poland.

== History ==
The Church of St. Mary Magdalene was founded in the early 13th century after the city's main parish functions were transferred from St. Adalbert's Church to a new parish serving the developing left-bank town in 1226. The first Romanesque church on the site was destroyed during the Mongol invasion of 1241 and subsequently rebuilt in the mid-13th century. Following a major fire in 1342, the church was extensively reconstructed in Brick Gothic form, creating much of the present structure, including its characteristic twin towers.

It was the first church in Breslau (Wrocław) redesigned around the requirements of the Protestant community established in 1523 following the Reformation. On 21 October 1523, the city's first Lutheran services were held in the church.

During the Second World War the church suffered severe destruction, including major fire damage and the collapse of parts of its towers. In 1945 the legendary Sinner's Bell, which was the biggest Silesian bell, was also damaged. St Mary Magdalene was rebuilt during the period 1947–1953.

In 1972, the church was transferred to the Catholic Church in Poland.

== Description ==
The most precious relic of the church is a Romanesque portal dating from the 12th century, coming from a Benedictine monastery in Ołbin that had been torn down in the 16th century.

The bridge connecting the two towers is called the "Mostek Czarownic" (Witches’ Bridge). A legend says that the shadows visible on the bridge are the souls of the girls who used to seduce men without wanting to be married, being scared of housekeeping.

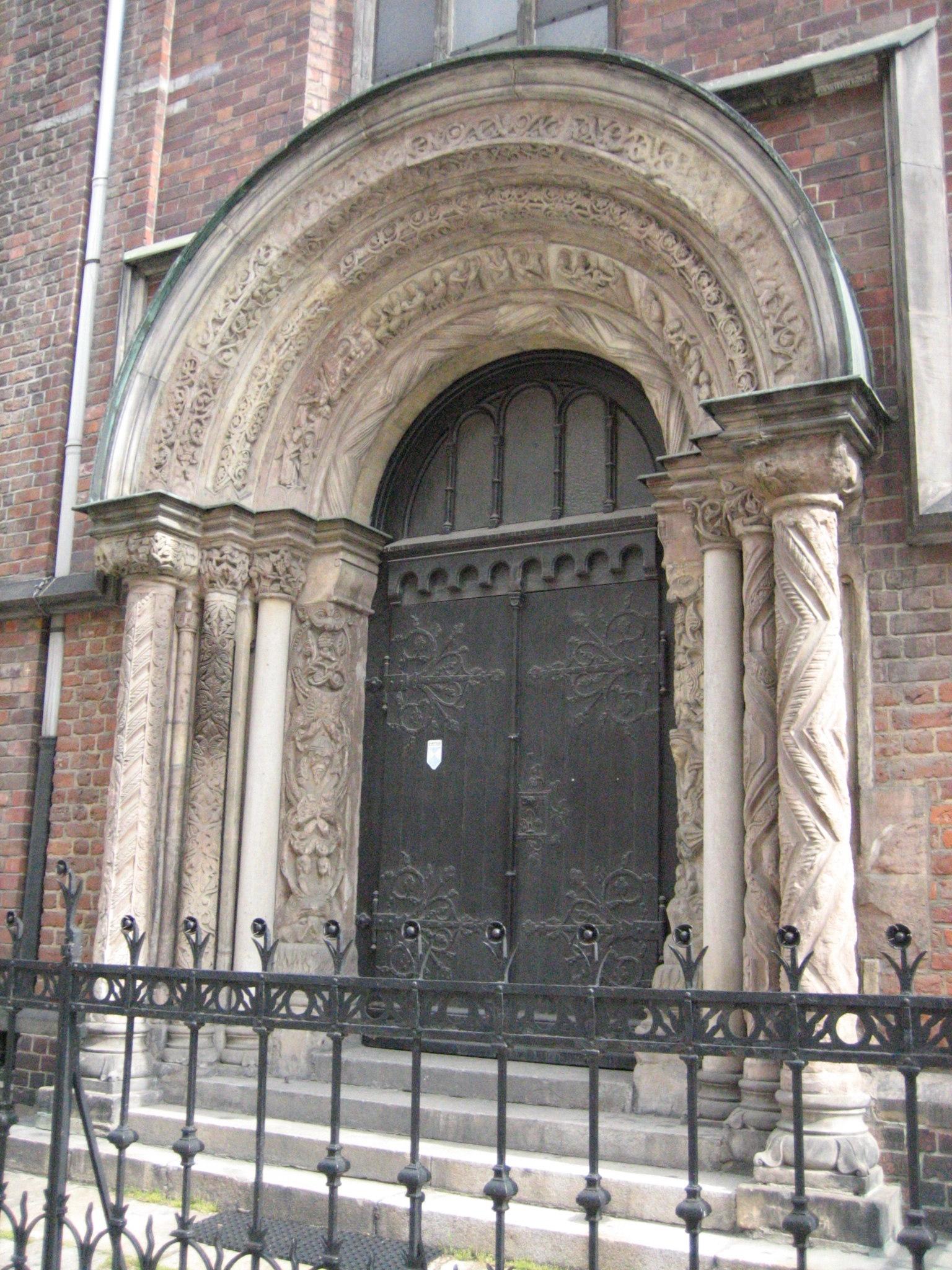
Romanesque portal

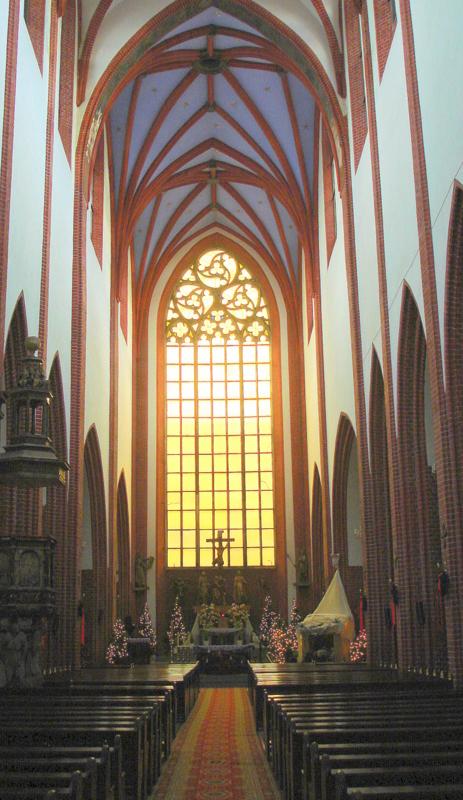
Cathedral interior

== Bibliography ==
- Malgorzata Urlich-Kornacka A guide to Wrocław
- Beata Maciejewska Spacerownik Wrocławski
