= New Market Square, Wrocław =

Square in Wrocław, Poland

Coordinates: 51.111232°N 17.038199°E

New Market Square
- plac Nowy Targ
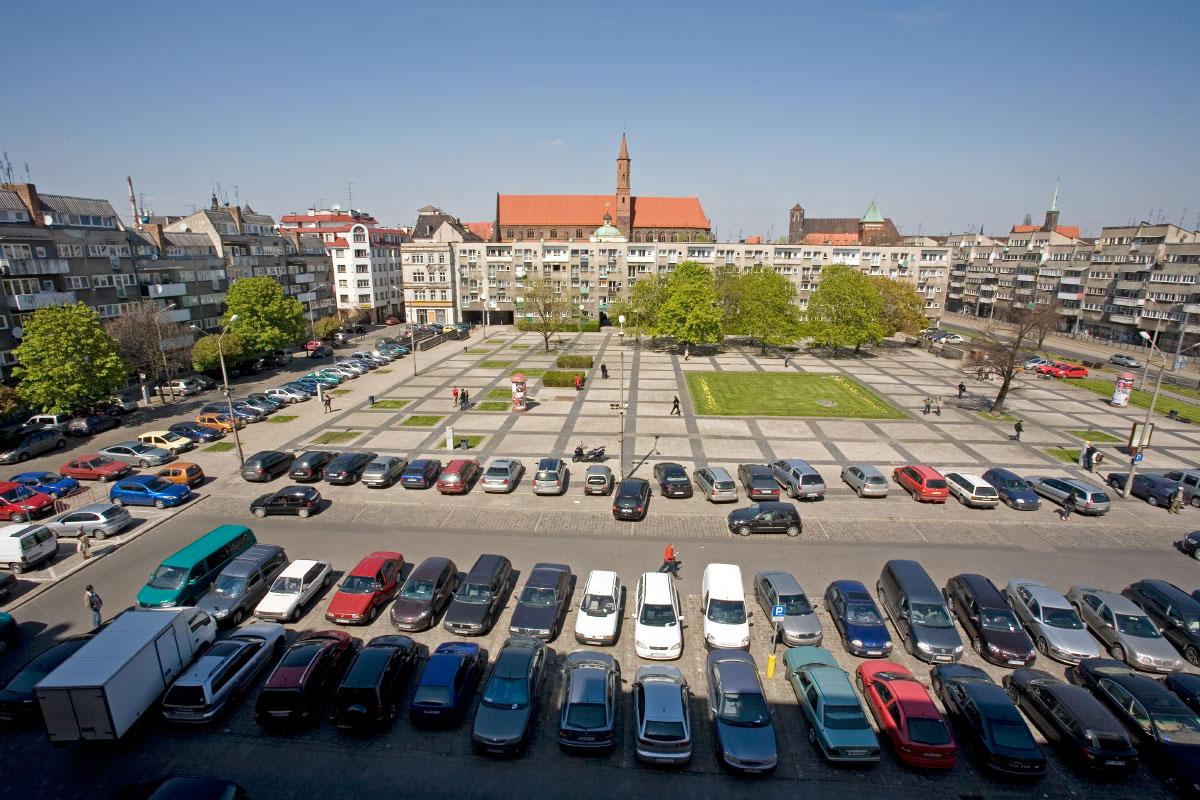
- Location: Wrocław, Lower Silesian Voivodeship, Poland

The New Market Square (Polish: plac Nowy Targ [plat͡s ˈnɔvɨ ˈtark]; German: Neumarkt) is a market square in Wrocław, Poland. It is one of the three historic market squares of the city's old town, next to the Market Square and the Salt Market Square.

In 1945, most of the buildings on the square were completely destroyed. The only buildings that survived World War II were the administrative building now serving as a branch of the city hall, and a tenement house on the corner of Jodłowa Street.

== History ==
The first mention of the square dates back to 1266, although the square in its present form was probably created only in the 1360s. In 1534, the square was paved with stones from the demolition of St. Vincent's Abbey in Ołbin. In 1592, a water well was built in the middle of the square. In 1732, the well was transformed into a fountain of Neptune, whom the locals called Gabeljürgen ('Pitchfork George').

The square was almost completely destroyed at the end of the Second World War. In the 1950s and 1960s, residential buildings were constructed around the square. The square underwent renovations in 2013, when an underground parking lot was constructed, and in 2023–2024, when the square was redesigned to include more greenery.

== Gallery ==
=== Pre-war ===
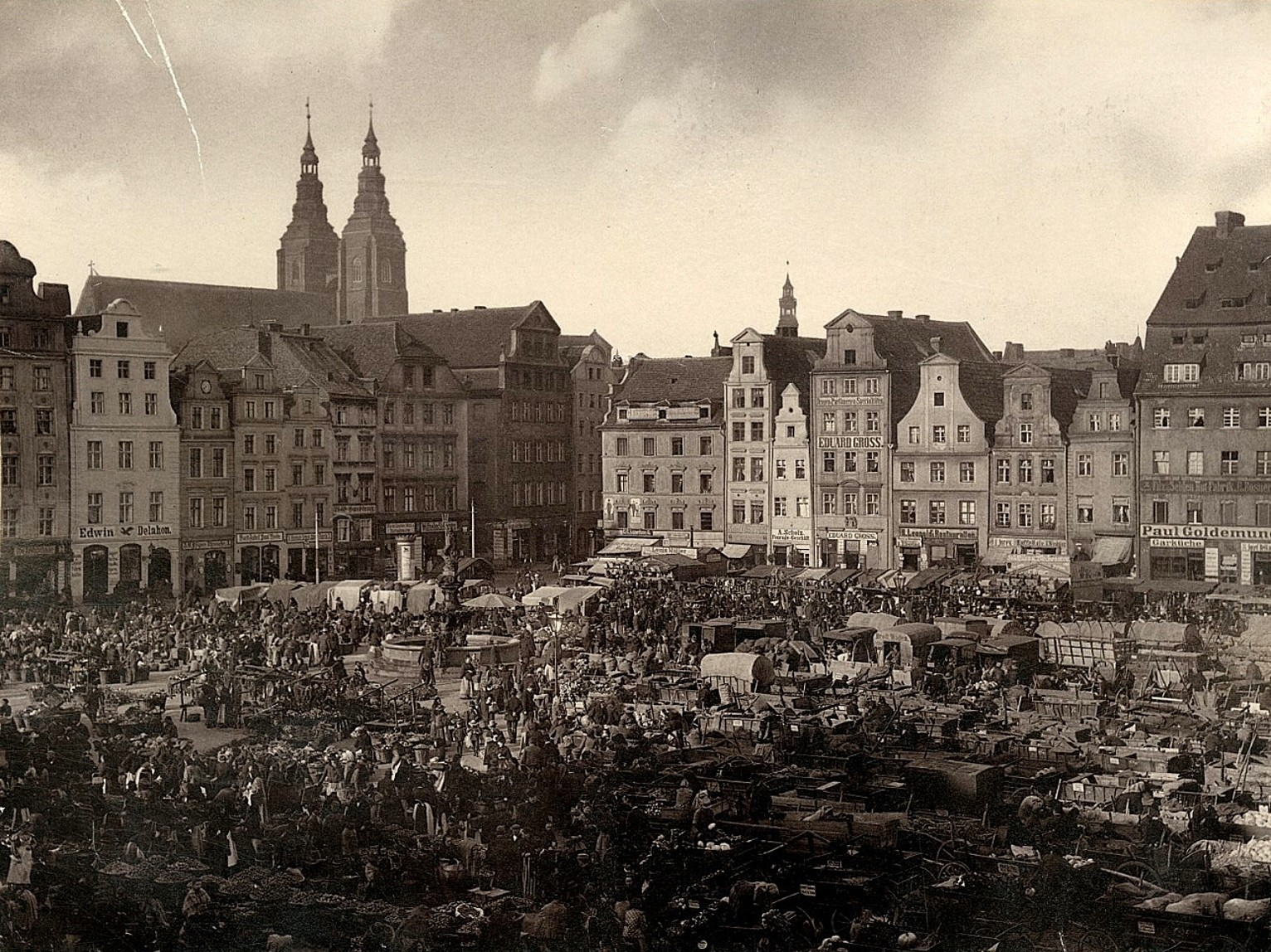
The square in 1890

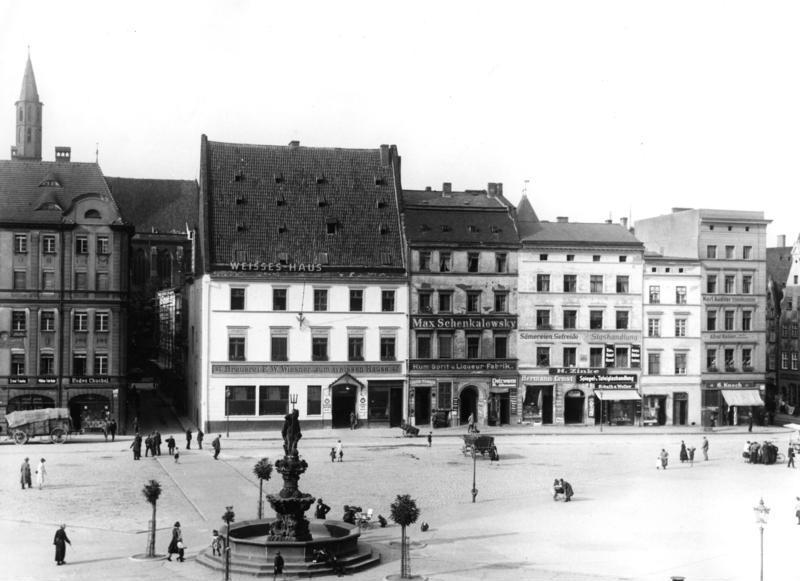
New Market Square and Neptune Fountain

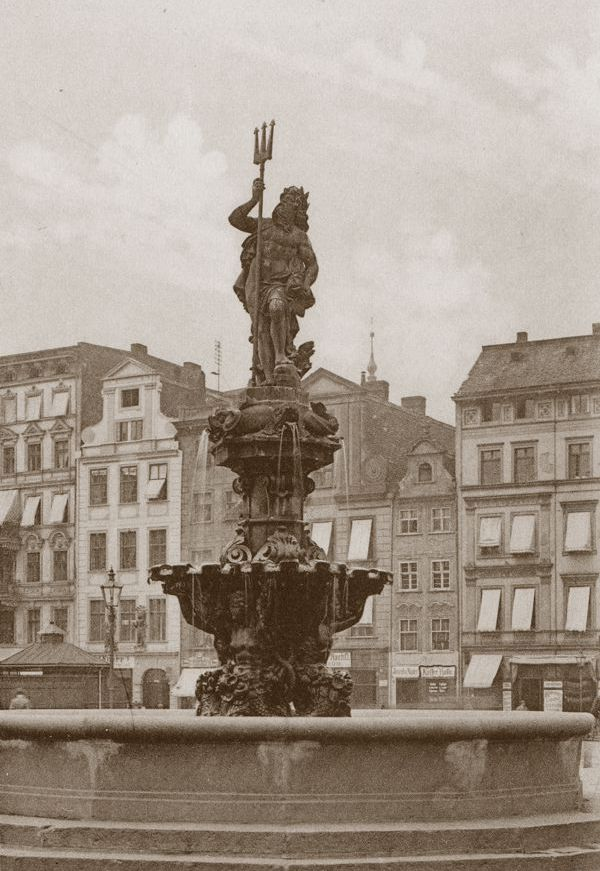
Neptune Fountain

=== Post-war ===
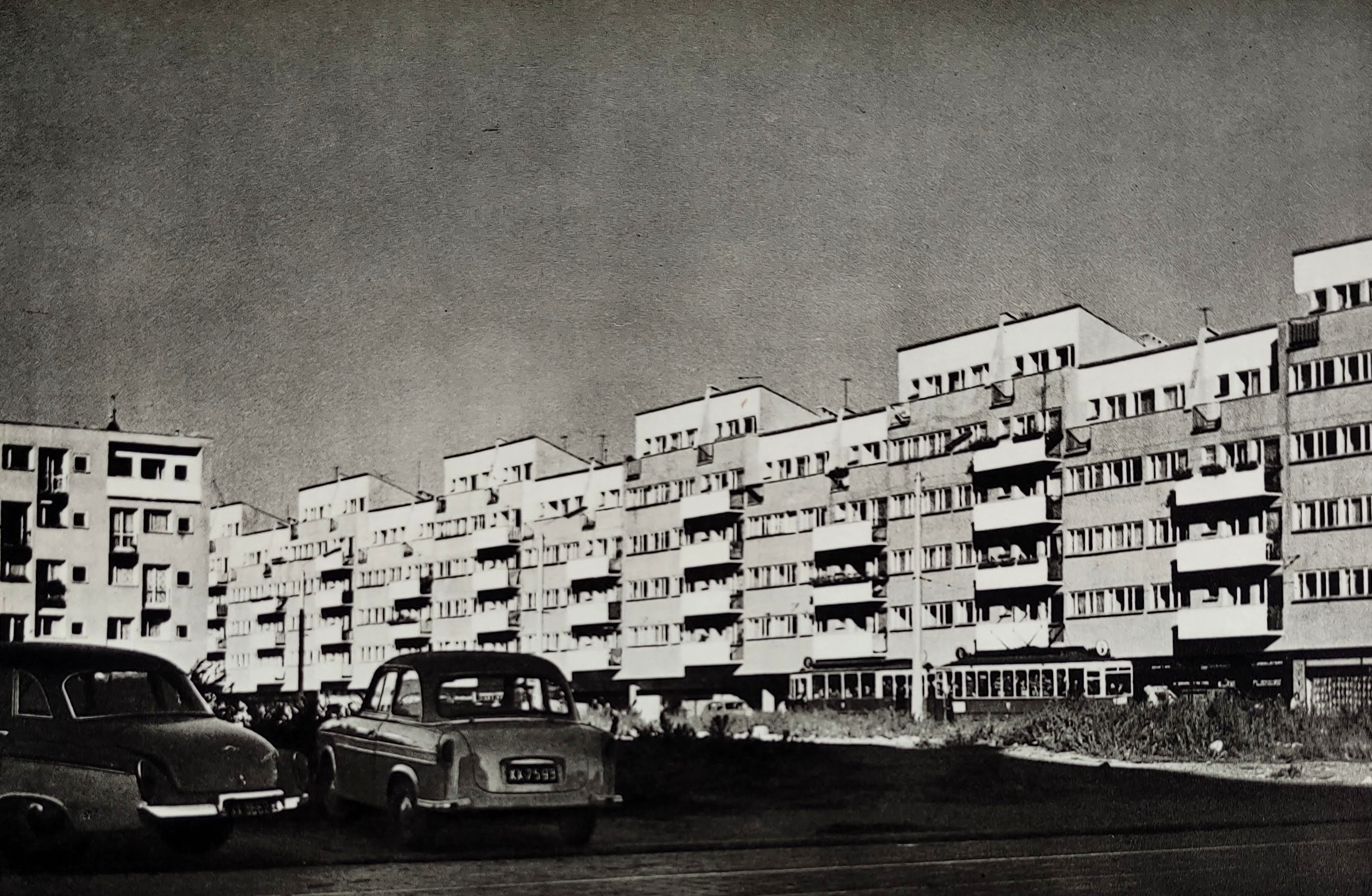
Eastern frontage of the square

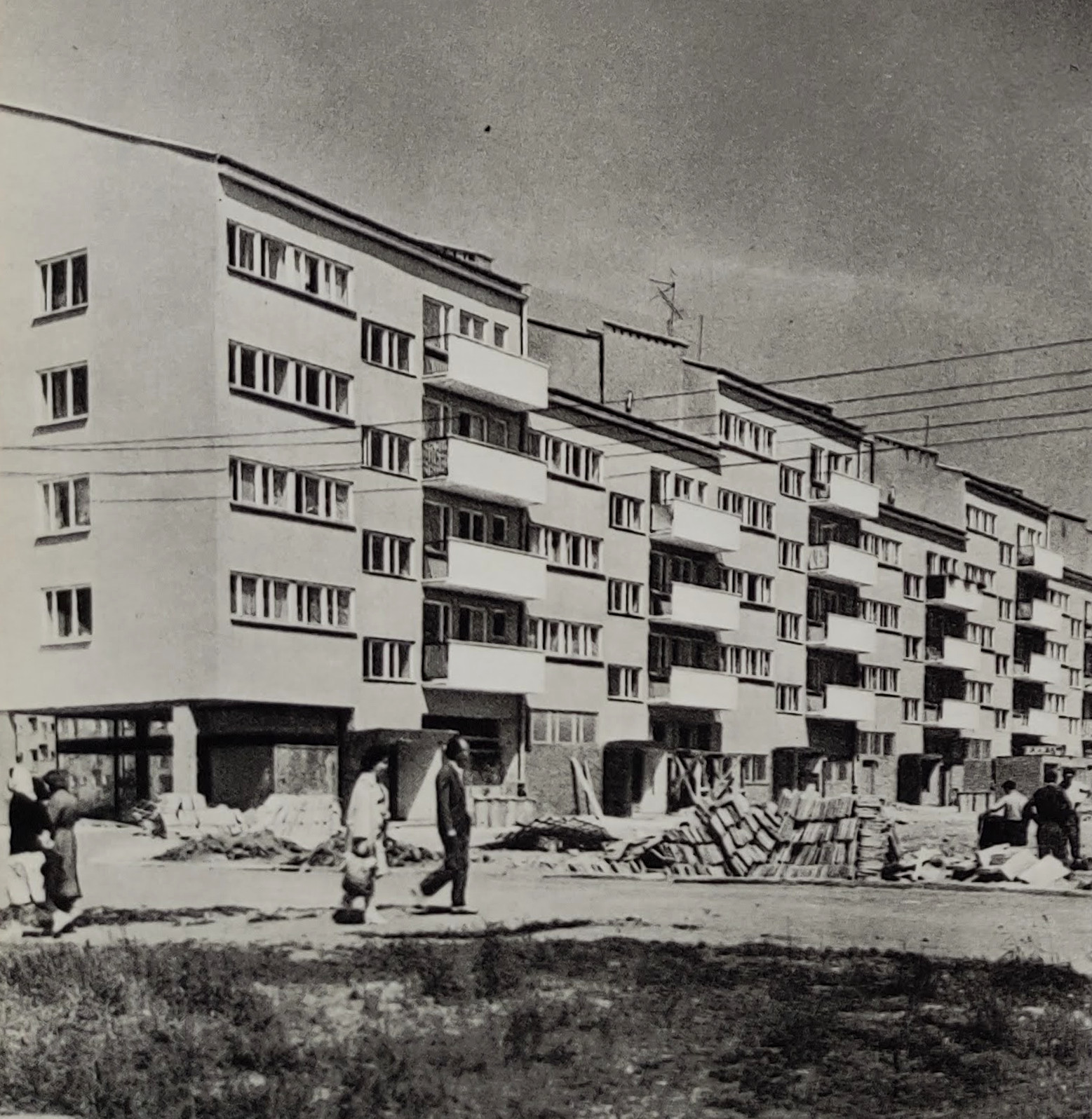
Western frontage of the square

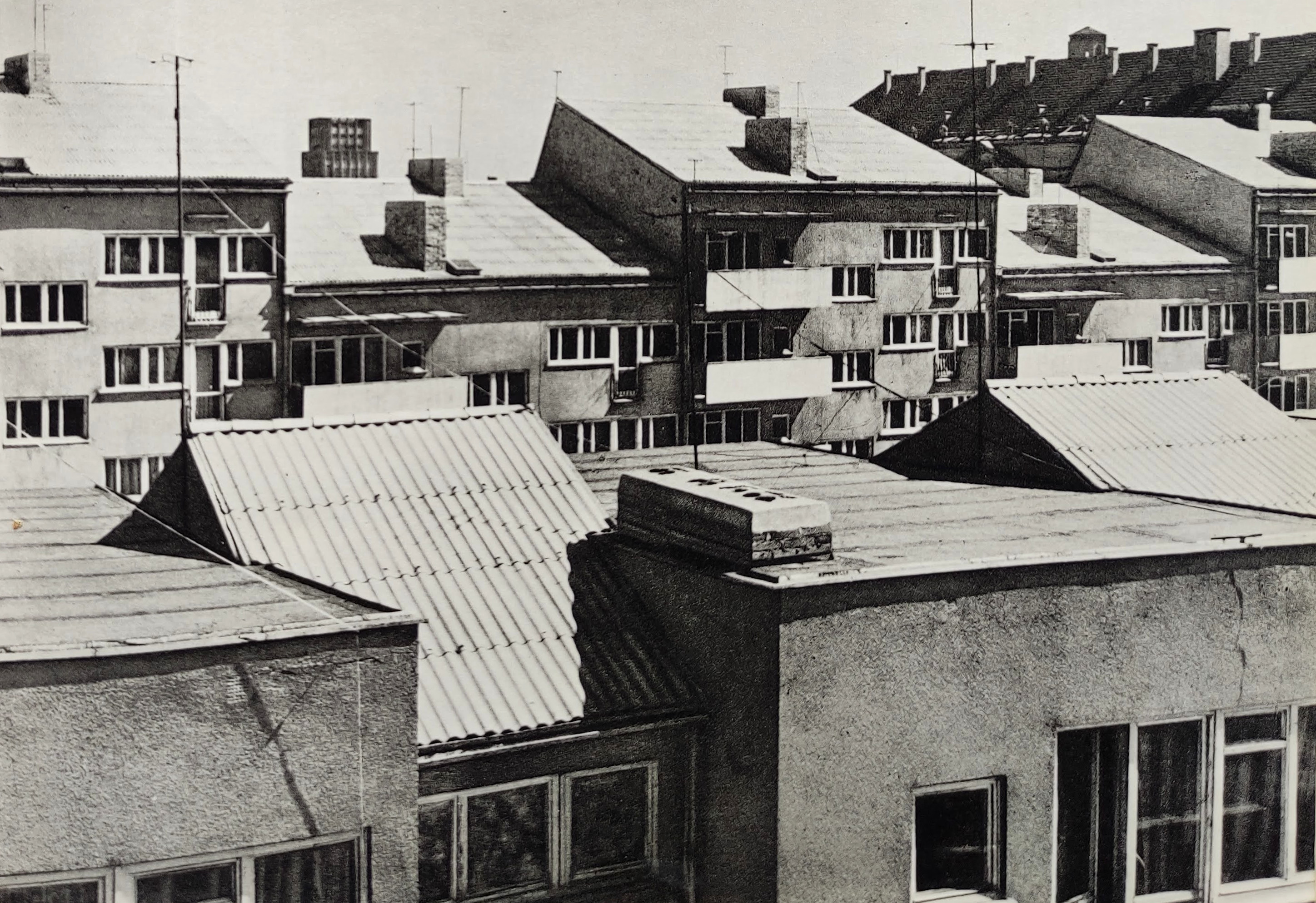
Roofs of the new buildings

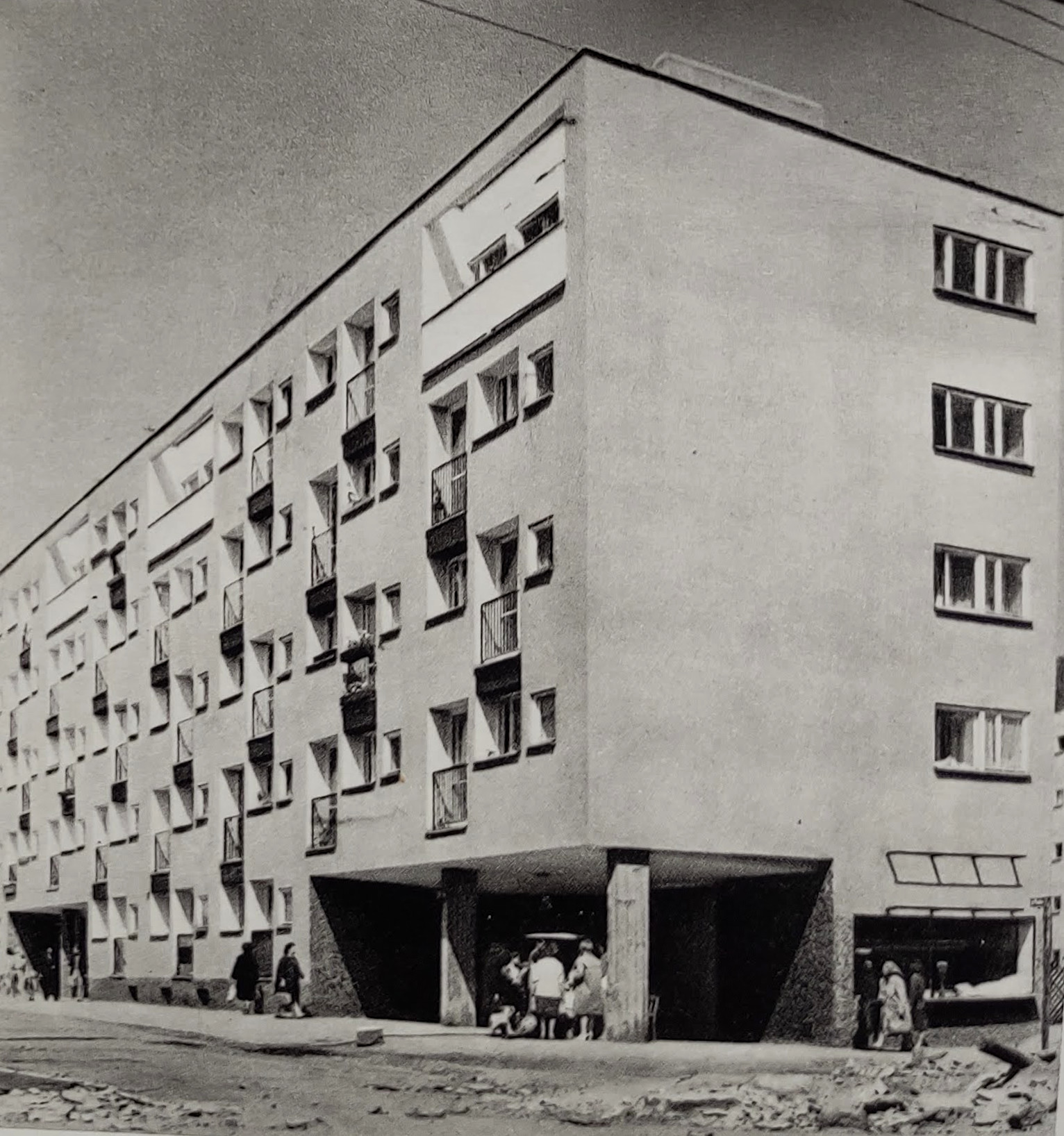
A building on Piaskowa Street
