= Salt Square =

Square in Wrocław, Poland

Coordinates: 51.109406°N 17.029362°E

Salt Market Square
- plac Solny
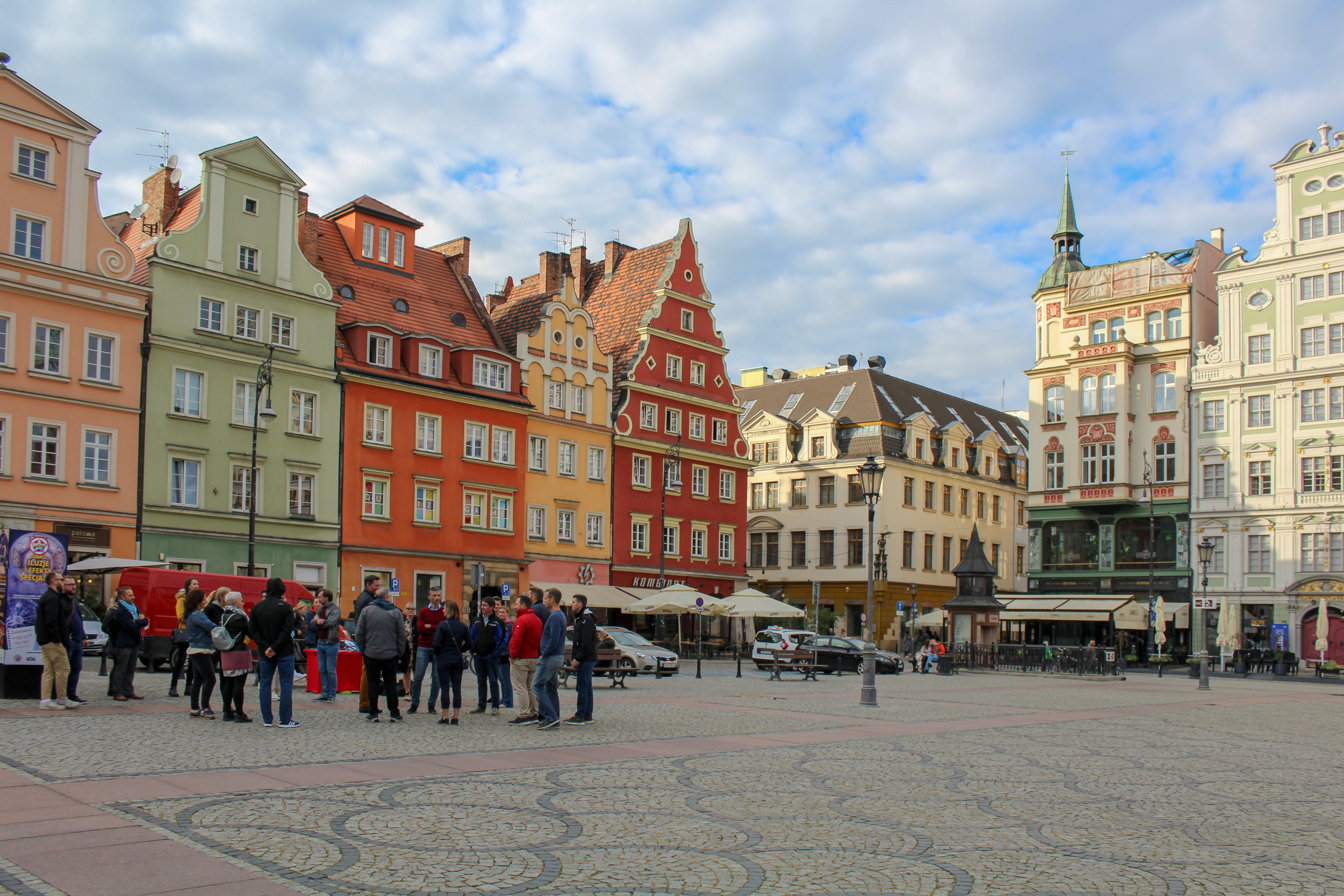
- Location: Wrocław, Lower Silesian Voivodeship, Poland

The Salt Square (Polish: plac Solny [plat͡s ˈsɔlnɨ]; German: Salzring, [1827–1945] Blücherplatz) is a medieval market square in Wrocław, Poland. It is one of the three historic market squares in the city's old town, next to the Market Square and the New Market Square. It is located in the city center, on the southwestern corner of the Market Square.

== History ==
The market square was established around the year 1241, at the time of the city's renewed establishment after the Mongol invasion. Due to the valuable importance of salt at the time, it was named after the product.

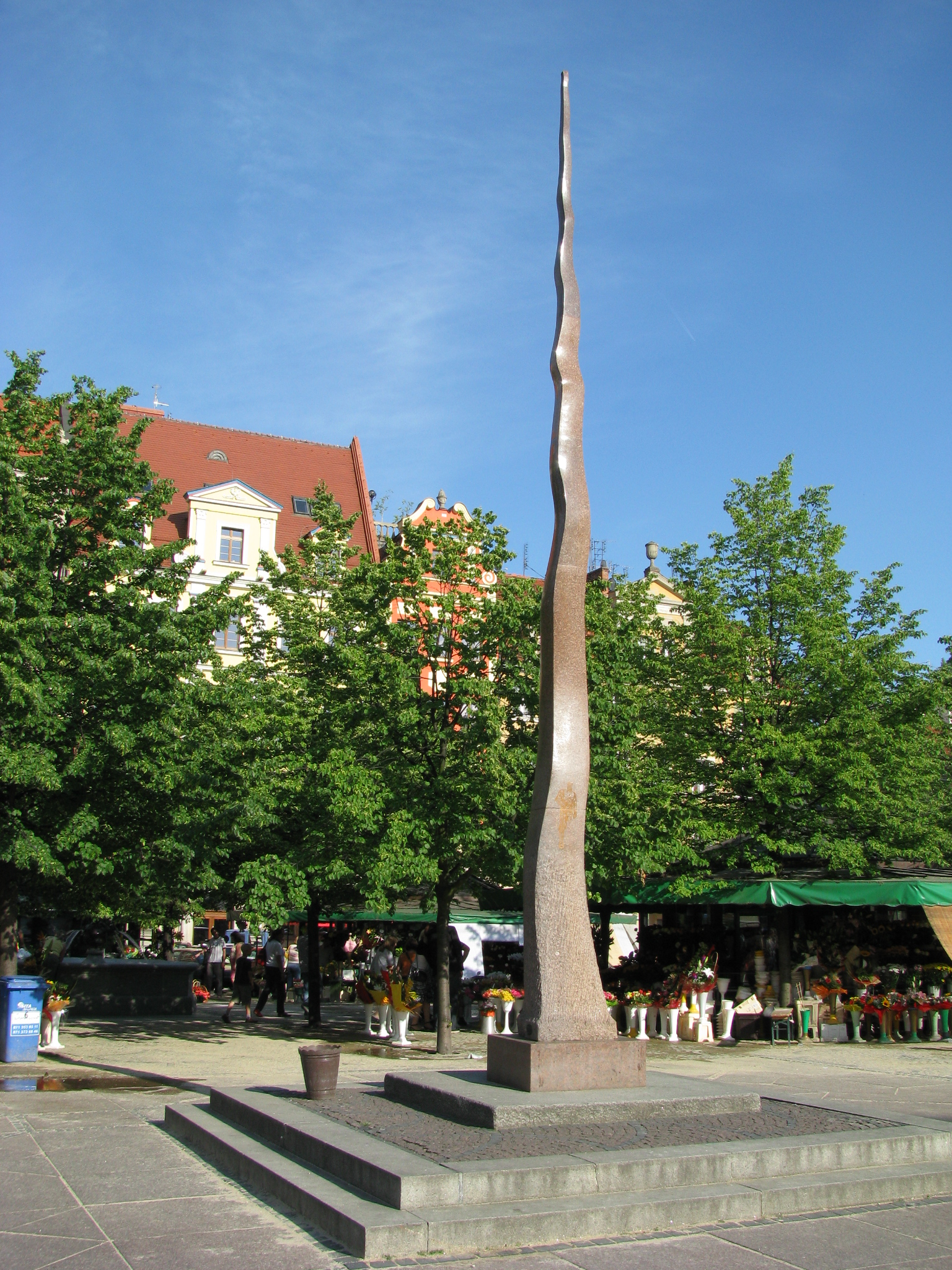
'Small Iglica' on the Salt Market Square

In 1827, a monument to Field Marshal Blücher was constructed on the square, causing it to be renamed Blücherplatz. After World War II, the original name of the square was restored and the monument was demolished. In 1996, a needle-like monument called 'Small Iglica' (Polish: Mała Iglica), designed by Adam Wyspiański, was built where the Blücher monument once stood.

During World War II, most of the 19th-century tenements on the square were either destroyed or badly damaged, and were rebuilt in 1960 and 1961, mostly in a neo-Baroque style. In 1996, the square was re-paved and re-lit. Today, the square is home to a flower market.
