= Barasch Brothers' Department Store =

Department store in Wrocław, Poland

Coordinates: 51°6′34″N 17°1′59″E

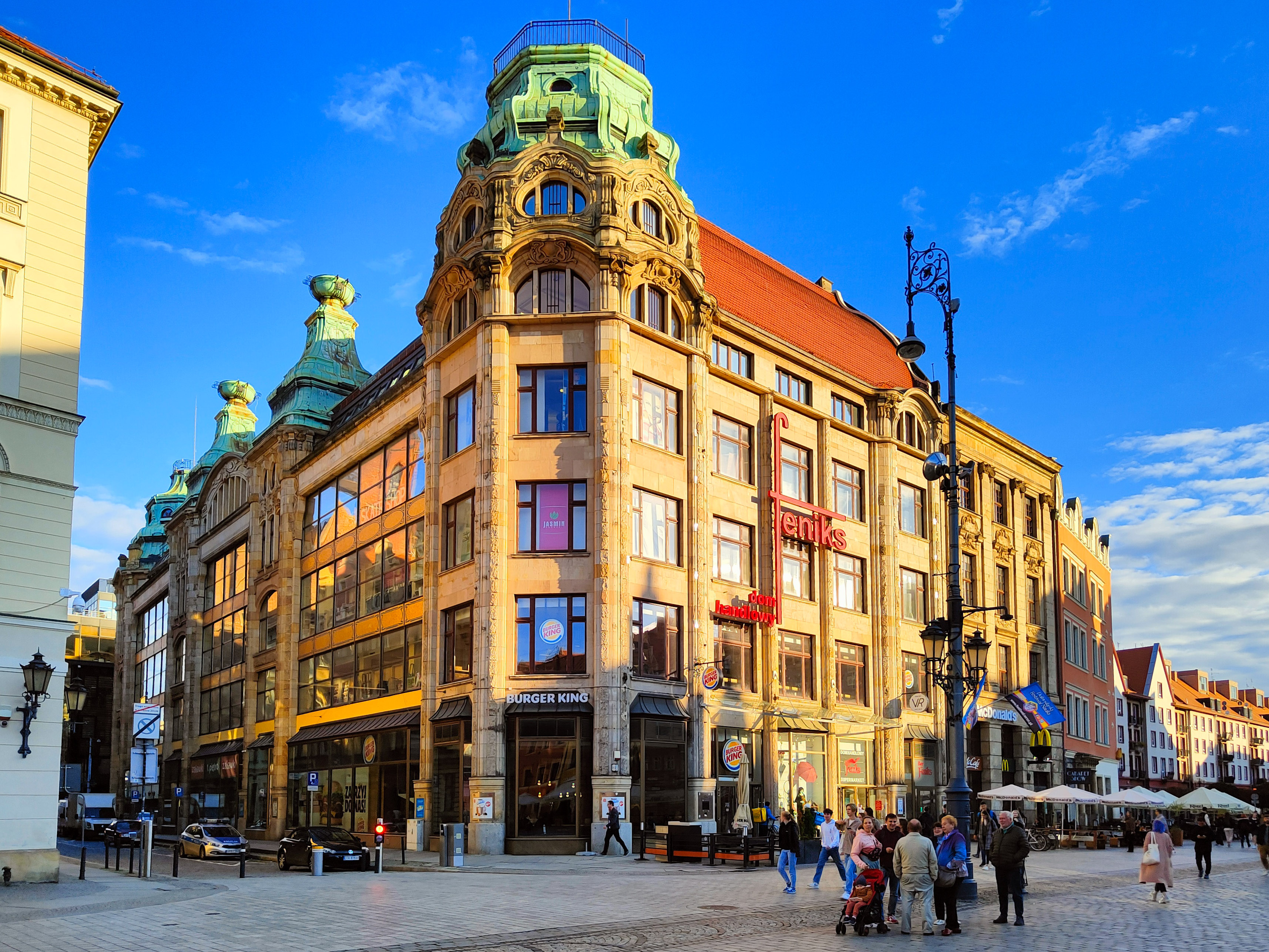
The former Barasch Brothers' Department Store, view from the Market Square, 2022

Original Art Nouveau façade, 1904

The Barasch Brothers' Department Store (German: Warenhaus Gebrüder Barasch) is the original name of a department store in Wrocław, Poland (then Breslau, Germany), located between the eastern side of the market square and the Ulica Szewska (German: Schuhbrücke). Today, the building accommodates the Phoenix Department Store (Polish: Dom Handlowy Feniks).

== History ==
Built from 1902 to 1904 for the German Jewish merchant family Barasch by architect Georg Schneider, the store was opened on 4 October 1904. In 1929, the original Art Nouveau facade facing the market square was given a simpler, modernist look; the huge glazing above the main entrance was replaced with more conventional window rows. The large glass globe on the main tower at the corner of Ulica Szewska and Kurzy Targ (German: Hintermarkt), which had been damaged by lightning, was also removed.

After the Nazi party came into power, the Jewish Barasch family came under pressure, and at the turn of 1934 and 1935 decided to sell its chain of department stores and leave the country, even before the official Aryanization of Jewish businesses began.

Like all of the historical center of Breslau, the building was heavily damaged in the final phase of World War II. However, immediately after the Polish administration was set up in 1945, reconstruction began and the building was reassigned to its original purpose on 7 August 1946. Initially, only the ground floor was restored and used for business. From 1961, the building was completely renovated and modernized; the second and third floors were added to the retail space. In 1965, the business reopened under the name Spółdzielczy Dom Handlowy "Feniks" ("Co-operative Department Store 'Phoenix'), which is still used today. The building itself remained municipal property until 1995, when the company finally purchased it from the local administration.

Another important store was located close to the city castle in Königsberg (now Kaliningrad, Russian Federation). This store was already in place by mid 1910 as can be seen on contemporary post cards. This building does no longer exist.

== Literature ==
- Krystyna Kirschke/Paweł Kirschke: Sto lat domu handlowego "Feniks". (Warenhaus Gebrüder Barasch), Wrocław: "Społem" Powszechna Spółdzielnia Spożywców Feniks, 2004
