= Joshua Barash =

American photographer

- Born: United States
- Occupation: Photographer

Joshua Barash is an American photographer based in Los Angeles. He has lived in Toronto, Canada and New York. Barash has an extensive resume in both commercial/editorial and fine art photography. Barash began his professional career with the Gannett Company at their New York Newspaper group. While there, he became a member of the National Press Photographers Association (NPPA) and had to opportunity to shoot at many New York Knicks, New York Yankees and New York Mets games.

After several years at Gannett, he became a freelance photographer. His images have appeared in many publications including Los Angeles Times Magazine, New York Post, Washington Post, Music Connection, Airways Magazine, Landscape and many online publications.

Josh Barash has worked for MTV, Qantas, AMPAS, BASF, Tourism Australia, Nickelodeon, Evian, Comedy Central, Nokia and others.

His photo was used in the book "I Still Call Australia Home - The Qantas Story 1920–2005" (Focus Publishing) by Malcolm Knox.

Joshua's fine art work has achieved national acclaim and have appeared in galleries throughout the United States.

"Joshua Barash is a contemporary photographer that uses several types of media to make unique, interesting images. What makes his work so distinct is his use of light projections of other photographs on the bodies of women... One of his most striking images that speaks to his use of design is Under Riverside Drive II."

Mist on Causeway - "...this composition handles the projected process in a compositionally effective way, with a resulting image that offers an innovative and striking integration of image and surface."

Under Riverside Drive II - "The human body provides an ideal surface for a highly complex and contrasting image, resulting in a strong directional focus and resolution."
