= Timeline of Wrocław =

Coordinates: 51°07′N 17°02′E

Historical affiliations

Silesians until 985
Duchy of Poland 985–1025
Kingdom of Poland 1025–1038
Duchy of Bohemia 1038–1054
Kingdom of Poland 1054–ca. 1320
Duchy of Silesia 1320–1348
Kingdom of Bohemia 1348–1526
Habsburg monarchy 1526–1742
Kingdom of Prussia 1742–1918
North German Confederation 1867–1871
German Empire 1871–1918
Weimar Germany 1918–1933
Nazi Germany 1933–1945
People's Republic of Poland 1945–1989
Republic of Poland 1989–present

The following is a timeline of the history of the city of Wrocław, Poland.

== Prior to 16th century ==
- around 550 – At the end of the Migration Period in the present areas of Wrocław, the Slavic tribe of the Lechitic/Polish group Ślężanie settled.
- 921 – Vratislaus I, Duke of Bohemia, founds the city which holds his latin name Vratislavia
- 985 – Mieszko I of Poland in power.
- 1000
  - Bishopric of Wrocław established.
  - Population: 1,000 (approximate).
- 1037 – Pagan Uprising.
- 1038 – Bohemians in power.
- 1054 – Poles in power.
- 1109 – August 24: Battle of Hundsfeld (Psie Pole), Polish victory against the invading Germans.
- ca. 1112/1118 – Wrocław named one of the three major cities of the Polish Kingdom alongside Kraków and Sandomierz in the Gesta principum Polonorum.
- 1138 – Town becomes capital of Duchy of Silesia within the fragmented Polish realm.

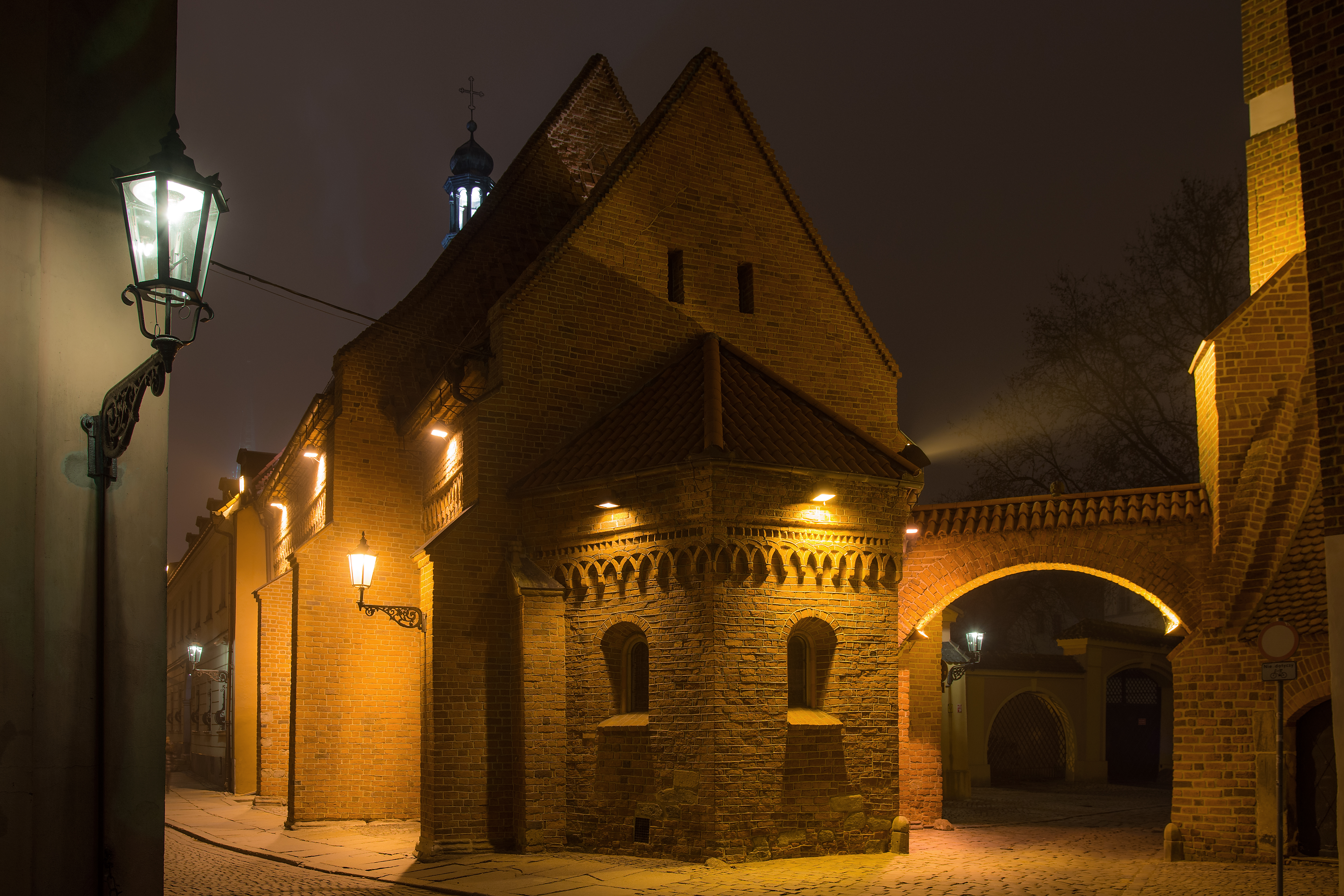
Romanesque church of St. Giles, the oldest preserved church of Wrocław

- around 1240 – Church of St. Vincent founded by High Duke of Poland Henry II the Pious.
- 1241
  - Town besieged by Mongols during the First Mongol invasion of Poland.
  - Burial of Henry II the Pious, killed in the Battle of Legnica, in the Church of St. Vincent, as the first Polish monarch to be buried in Wrocław.
- 1242 – Church of St. Giles built.
- 1245 – Franciscan friar Benedict of Poland joined Italian diplomat Giovanni da Pian del Carpine on his journey to the seat of the Mongol Khan near Karakorum, the capital of the Mongol Empire.
- 1257 – Church of St. Elizabeth built.
- 1262 – Magdeburg rights adopted.
- 1272 – Cathedral of St. John the Baptist consecrated.
- 1273 – Piwnica Świdnicka, one of the oldest still operating restaurants in Europe, opened.
- 1274 – Duke Henryk IV Probus granted Wrocław staple right.
- 1288 – Holy Cross church founded by High Duke of Poland Henryk IV Probus.
- 1290 – Death and burial of Henryk IV Probus in the Holy Cross church, that was still under construction, as the second Polish monarch to be buried in Wrocław.
- 1295 – Holy Cross church consecrated.
- 1333 – Town Hall building expanded.
- 1335 – City annexed to the Kingdom of Bohemia.
- 1342 – Fire.
- 1344 – Fire.
- 1348 – Charles IV, Holy Roman Emperor visits the city.
- 1351 – Saints Stanislaus, Dorothy and Wenceslaus church founded.
- 1362 – St. Mary Magdalene Church built.
- 1387 – City joins Hanseatic League.
- 1418 – Guild revolt.
- 1466 – Meeting of Polish diplomat Jan Długosz and the papal legate in Wrocław, which enabled peace talks between Poland and the Teutonic Order, which culminated a few months later in the signing of a peace treaty in Toruń ending the Thirteen Years' War.
- 1469 – City passed to Hungarian King Matthias Corvinus.
- 1474
  - Siege by combined Polish-Bohemian forces.
  - Meeting of the Polish, Bohemian and Hungarian kings in the village of Muchobór Wielki (present-day district of Wrocław), ceasefire signed.
  - City leaves the Hanseatic League.

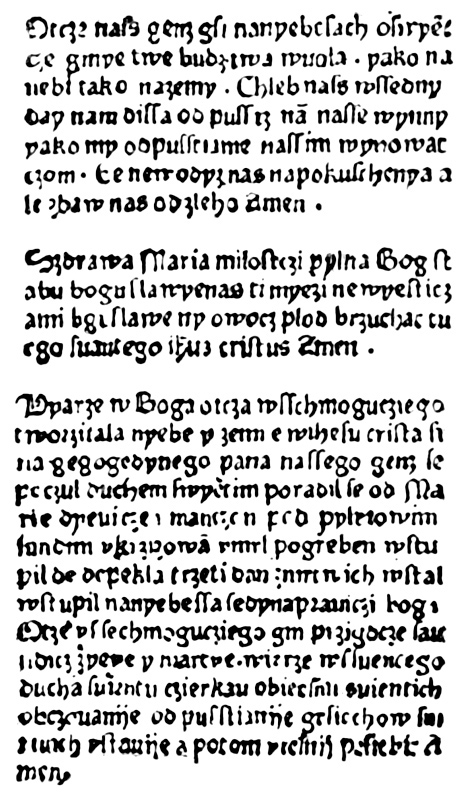
The oldest printed text in the Polish language in the Statuta Synodalia Episcoporum Wratislaviensis, printed in Wrocław by Kasper Elyan, 1475

- 1475 – Kasper Elyan founded the Drukarnia Świętokrzyska (Holy Cross Printing House), the city's first printing house, which in the same year published the Statuta synodalia episcoporum Wratislaviensium, the first ever incunable in Polish.
- 1492 – Pillory erected at the Market Square.

== 16th–18th centuries ==
- 1503 – Nicolaus Copernicus became a scholaster of the Collegiate Church of the Holy Cross.
- 1523 – Protestant Reformation.
- 1526 – City passes to Austria.
- 1530 – City coat of arms adopted.
- 1585 – Plague.
- 1625 – Plague.
- 1633 – Plague.
- 1666 – Polish Municipal School (Miejska Szkoła Polska) opened.
- 1670 – Miscellanea Curiosa Medico-Physica, the world's first medical journal published.
- 1672 – House of the Seven Electors built.
- 1702 – Leopoldina Jesuit college founded.
- 1717 – Palace built.
- 1723 – Bergstadtverlag Wilhelm Gottlieb Korn (publisher) in business.
- 1741 – Prussians in power.
- 1742 – Schlesische Zeitung begins publication.
- 1757 – Austrians in power, succeeded by Prussians.
- 1760 – City besieged.
- 1800 – Hospital of the Order of Saint Lazarus converted into a nursing home for elderly people.

== 19th century ==
- 1806 – December: City besieged by forces of the Confederation of the Rhine.
- 1807 – Old fortifications dismantled.
- 1808 – City limits expanded by including Przedmieście Oławskie and Przedmieście Świdnickie.
- 1810 – Lazarist monastery secularised.
- 1811 – Schlesische Friedrich-Wilhelm-Universität established.
- 1813 – Mobilization against Napoleon of France.
- 1815 – Royal Museum of Art and Antiquity established.
- 1817 – Polonia Polish resistance organization founded by Polish students.
- 1822 – Arrests of members of the Polonia organization and searches of their homes by the Prussian police.
- 1823 – Population: 76,813.
- 1824 – Exchange built.
- 1829 – White Stork Synagogue opens.
- 1830 – Concert by Fryderyk Chopin.
- 1833 – Horse racing in Szczytnicki Park begins.
- 1836 – Slavonic Literary Society founded.

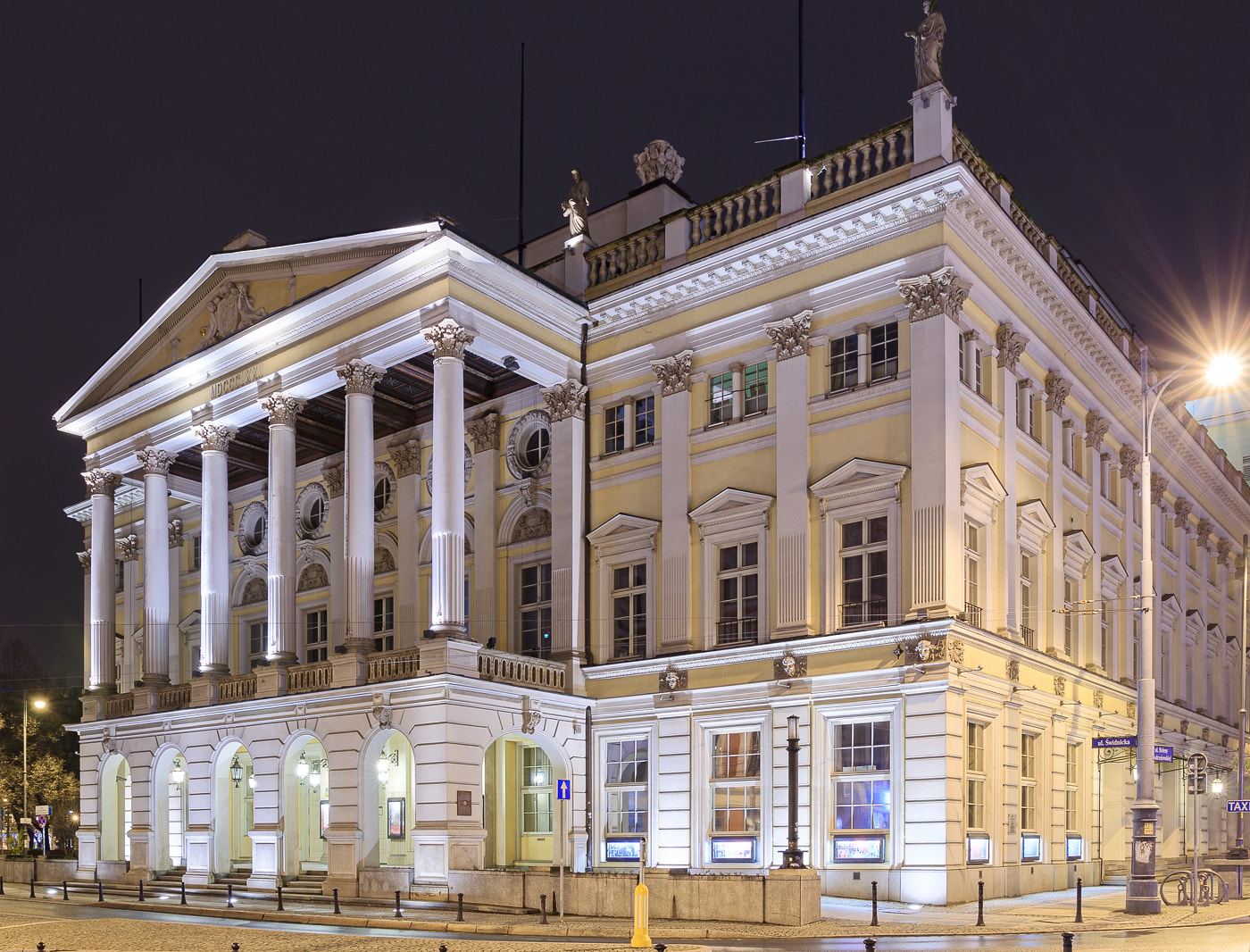
Wrocław Opera

- 1841 – Opera House opens.
- 1842 – Upper Silesian train station built.
- 1846 – Royal Palace building renovated.
- 1848
  - Many local Polish students joined the Greater Poland uprising against Prussia.
  - 5 May: Convention of Polish activists from the Prussian and Austrian partitions of Poland.
  - 9 May–8 July: Stay of Polish national poet Juliusz Słowacki, during which he met his mother for the first time in nearly 20 years and the last time.
- 1854 – Jewish Theological Seminary founded.
- 1856 – Jewish Cemetery established in Gabitz.
- 1857 – Central Station opens.
- 1861
  - Local Poles join Polish national mourning after the massacre of Polish protesters by Russian troops in Warsaw in February 1861.
  - City becomes an important center of preparations for the Polish January Uprising in the Russian Partition of Poland.
  - Orchestral Society founded.
- 1863
  - Mass searches of Polish homes by the Prussian police after the outbreak of the January Uprising.
  - June: City officially becomes the seat of secret Polish insurgent authorities.
  - New City Hall built.
- 1864 – January: Arrests of several members of the Polish insurgent movement by the Prussian police.
- 1865
  - Zoological Garden opens.
  - Theatre built.
- 1868 – City limits expanded by including Gajowice, Huby, Nowa Wieś, Dworek, Rybaki and Szczytniki.
- 1871
  - City becomes part of German Empire.
  - New Church of St. Michael consecrated.
  - Opera house rebuilt.
- 1872
  - New Synagogue consecrated.
  - Piast Brewery in business.
- 1873 – Population: 208,025.
- 1880 – Silesian Museum of Fine Arts established.
- 1883
  - St. Mauritius Bridge constructed.
  - Lutheran Theological Seminar opens.
- 1884 – Polish newspaper Nowiny Szląskie begins publication.
- 1886 – Viadrina (Jewish student society) formed.
- 1887 – "Government offices" built.
- 1889 – Tumski Bridge constructed.
- 1890 – Population: 335,186.
- 1891 – Concert by Ignacy Jan Paderewski.
- 1892 – Monopol Hotel built.

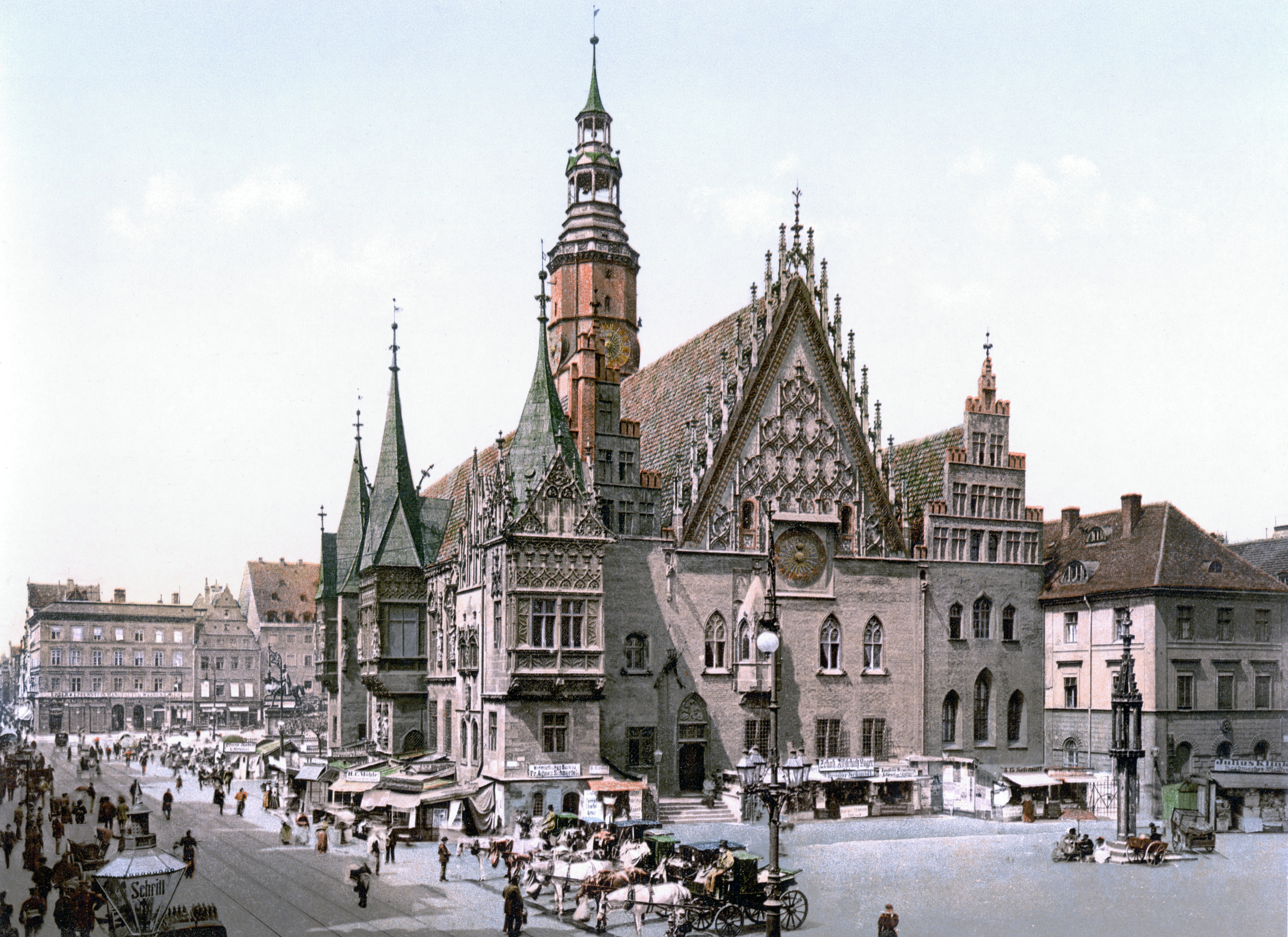
Market Square with the Old Town Hall around 1900

- 1894
  - Merchants Club built.
  - "Sokół" Polish Gymnastic Society established, as the first branch of the organization in Silesia.
- 1896 – Kleinburg (Dworek) and Pöpelwitz (Popowice) villages become part of city.
- 1897 – Zwierzyniecki Bridge constructed.
- 1899 – Silesian Museum of Applied Arts established.

== 20th century ==
=== 1900–1939 ===
- 1901 – Concert by Ignacy Jan Paderewski.
- 1903 – Flood.
- 1904
  - Herdain (Gaj) and Morgentau (Rakowiec) villages become part of city.
  - Barasch Brothers' Department Store opens.
- 1905
  - Population: 470,751.
  - Wrocław water tower built.

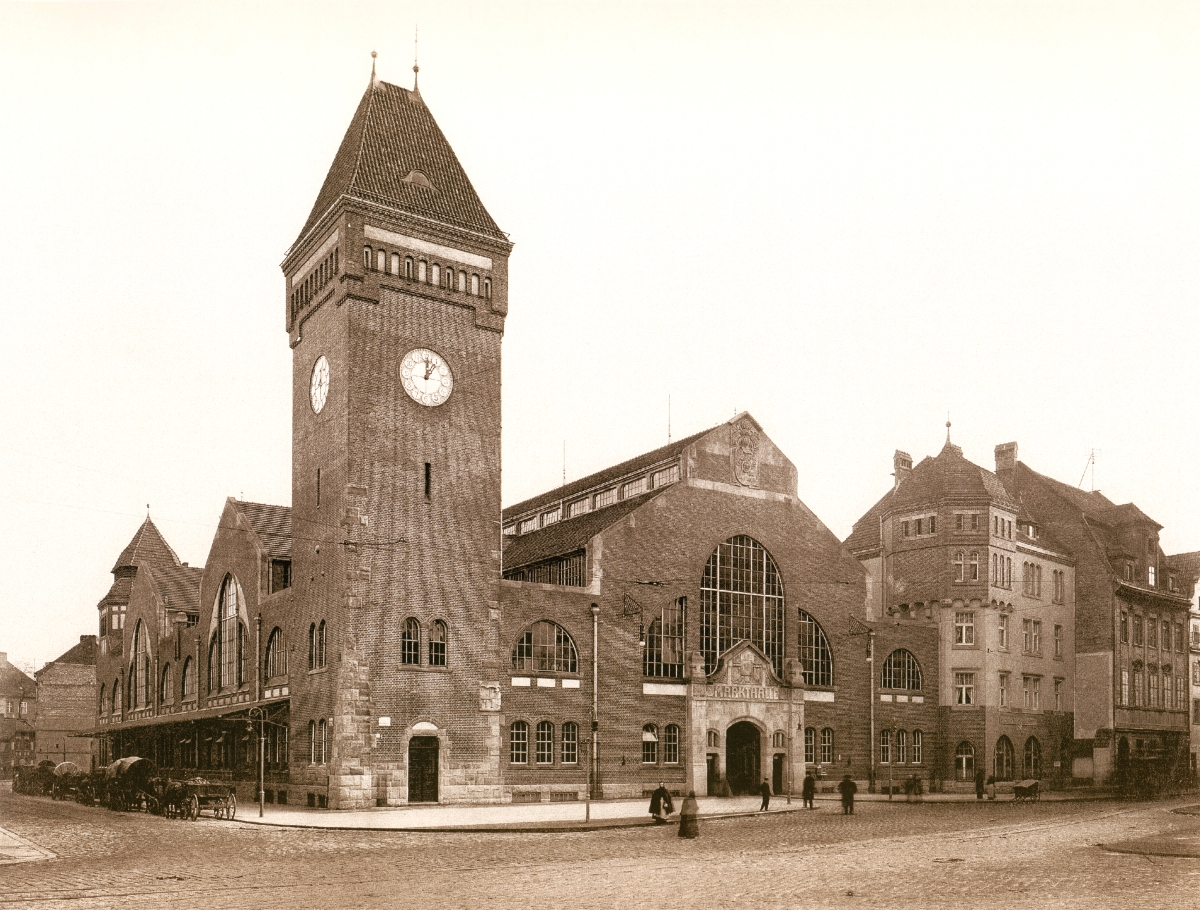
Wrocław Market Hall in 1909

- 1908 – Market Hall built.
- 1909
  - Theatre built.
  - Jan Mikulicz-Radecki monument unveiled.
- 1910
  - Grunwaldzki Bridge built.
  - Technische Hochschule was founded.
- 1911 – Gräbschen (Grabiszyn) village becomes part of city.
- 1913
  - Centennial Hall and Exhibition Grounds built.
  - Union of Jewish Liberal Youth organized.
- 1916 – Turnip winter (food rationing).
- 1919 – City becomes capital of Province of Lower Silesia.
- 1920
  - May – Consulate of the Republic of Poland opened.
  - August – Polish consulate attacked and demolished by a German nationalist militia.
- 1924 – Local branch of the Union of Poles in Germany founded.
- 1926 – Palace Museum opens.
- 1927 – Polish scout troop founded.
- 1928 – City limits largely expanded.
- 1929 – Workplace and House Exhibition held.

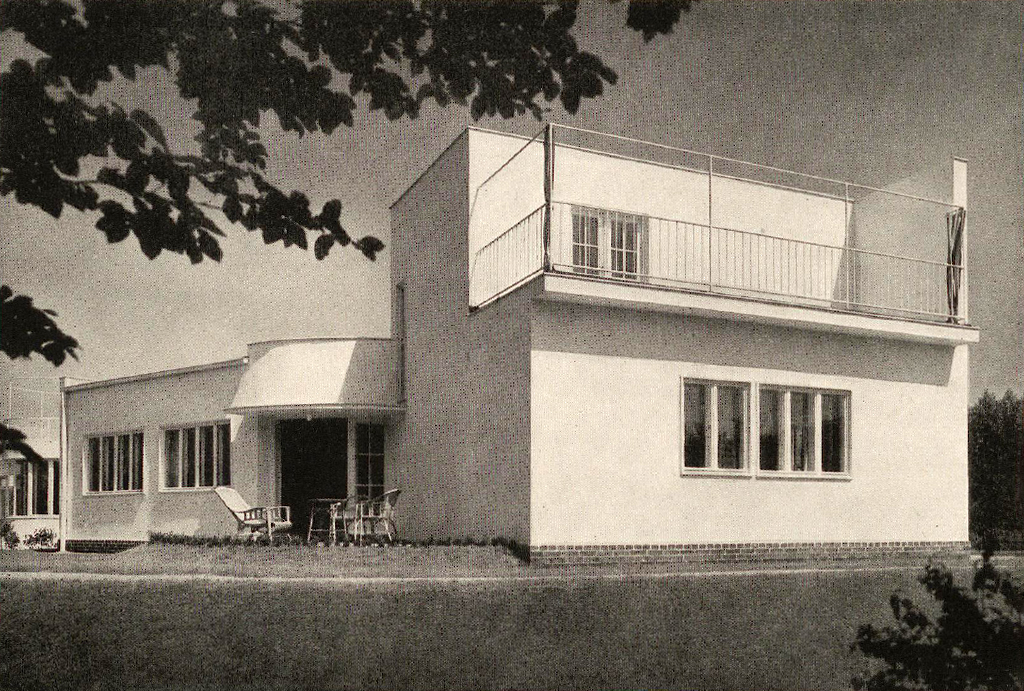
Part of the Workplace and House Exhibition

- 1930
  - Wertheim Department Store opens.
  - June: City hosts Deutsche Kampfspiele.
  - 12 September: Hitler gives campaign speech at the Centennial Hall.
- 1931 – Stahlheim rally, at which its German activists declared their disapproval of the interwar German-Polish order and expressed irredentist claims towards Poland and Lithuania.
- 1932 – Conflict between Communists and Nazis.
- 1933
  - January: Riots.
  - March: KZ Dürrgoy, one of the first Nazi concentration camps, established in the present-day district of Tarnogaj.
  - August: KZ Dürrgoy disestablished.
- 1938
  - July: Deutsches Turn- und Sportfest 1938 held.
  - November 9–10: Kristallnacht pogrom against Jews.
  - Airport built.
- 1939
  - June: Expulsion of Polish students from the university.
  - August: Headquarters of several local Polish organizations, known as the Polish House, searched by the Gestapo and closed down.

=== World War II (1939–1945) ===
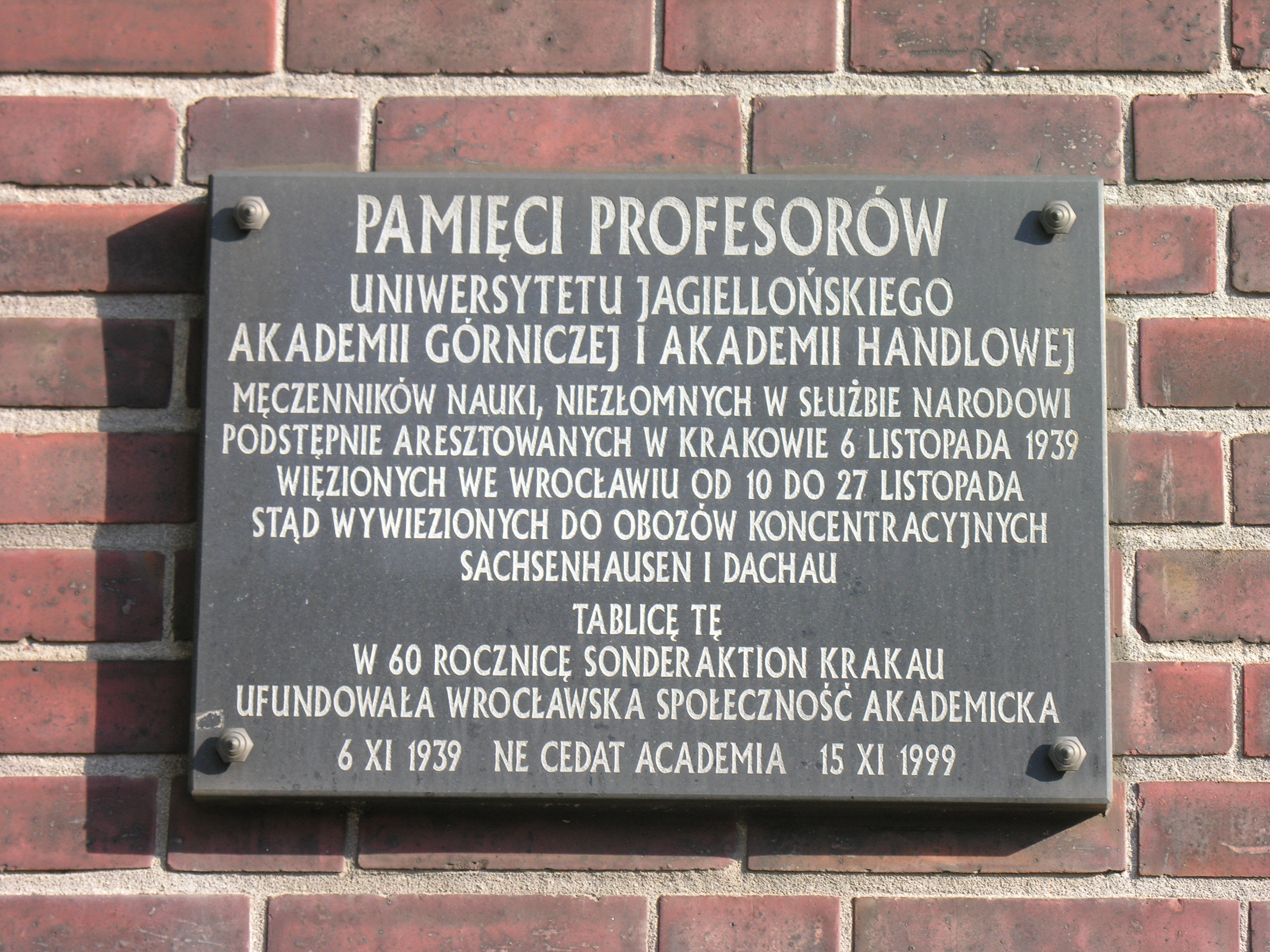
Memorial plaque to imprisoned Polish professors and lecturers from Kraków

- 1939
  - September: City made the headquarters of the southern district of the Selbstschutz, led by SS-Oberführer Fritz Katzmann, which task was to commit atrocities against Poles during the German invasion of Poland.
  - September: Mass arrests of Polish activists, Polish organizations banned.
  - 10 November: 173 Polish professors and lecturers of the Jagiellonian University, AGH University of Kraków and Kraków University of Economics imprisoned in the city (see Sonderaktion Krakau).
  - 27 November: Polish professors and lecturers of the Jagiellonian University, AGH University of Kraków and Kraków University of Economics deported to the Sachsenhausen concentration camp.
- 1940
  - Ausländer-Auffanglager forced labour camp established by the Germans; its prisoners were mostly Poles, but also Frenchmen, Czechs, Ukrainians, Hungarians, Yugoslavs, Greeks, etc. (mostly men, but also women and children)
  - Rheinmettal–Borsig forced labour camp established by the Germans; its prisoners were mostly Poles (men and women), but also Czechs (men and women), French POWs, Soviet POWs and Jews.
  - Forced labour camp in Sołtysowice established by the Germans; it housed between 4,000 and 10,000 prisoners, mostly Poles, but also Czechs, Ukrainians, Yugoslavs, Frenchmen, Englishmen, Dutchmen and Russians.
  - 20 April: Forced labour camp for Jewish men established by the Germans in the present-day district of Jerzmanowo.
  - September: Forced labour camp for Jews established by the Germans in Żerniki.

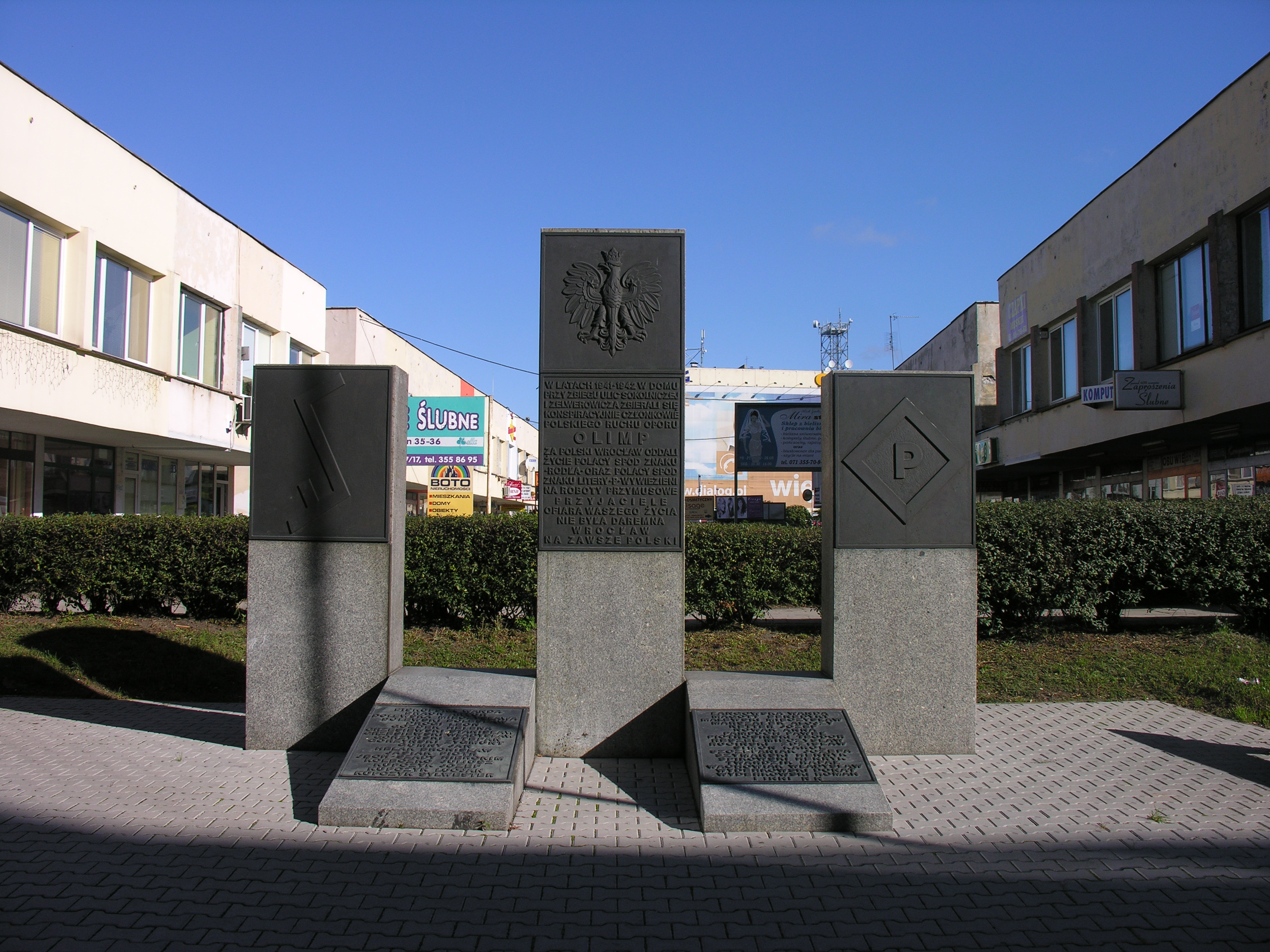
Monument to the Polish Olimp resistance organization in Wrocław

- 1941 – Olimp underground Polish resistance organization formed.
- 1942
  - 15 February: Forced labour camp for Jewish men in Jerzmanowo dissolved.
  - 15 July: Execution of Leon Kmiotek, commander of the Wojskowa Organizacja Ziem Zachodnich (Military Organization of the Western Lands) Polish resistance organization by the Germans.
  - August: AL Breslau-Lissa subcamp of the Gross-Rosen concentration camp established by the Germans, its prisoners were mostly Poles, but also Russians, Ukrainians, Germans, Frenchmen, Czechs, Yugoslavs.
- 1943
  - April 23: Polish Zagra-Lin attacks Nazi German troop transport.
  - Dulag 410 transit camp for Allied prisoners of war established by the Germans.
- 1944
  - March: Forced labour camp for Jews in Żerniki dissolved.
  - August: City declared a Nazi fortress.
  - Three more subcamps of the Gross-Rosen concentration camp established, for prisoners of various nationalities, including one subcamp for women.
  - Deportations of Poles from Warsaw to the forced labour camp in Sołtysowice following the Warsaw Uprising.
  - Prisoners of the Rheinmettal–Borsig forced labour camp evacuated to the Gross-Rosen concentration camp in a death march.

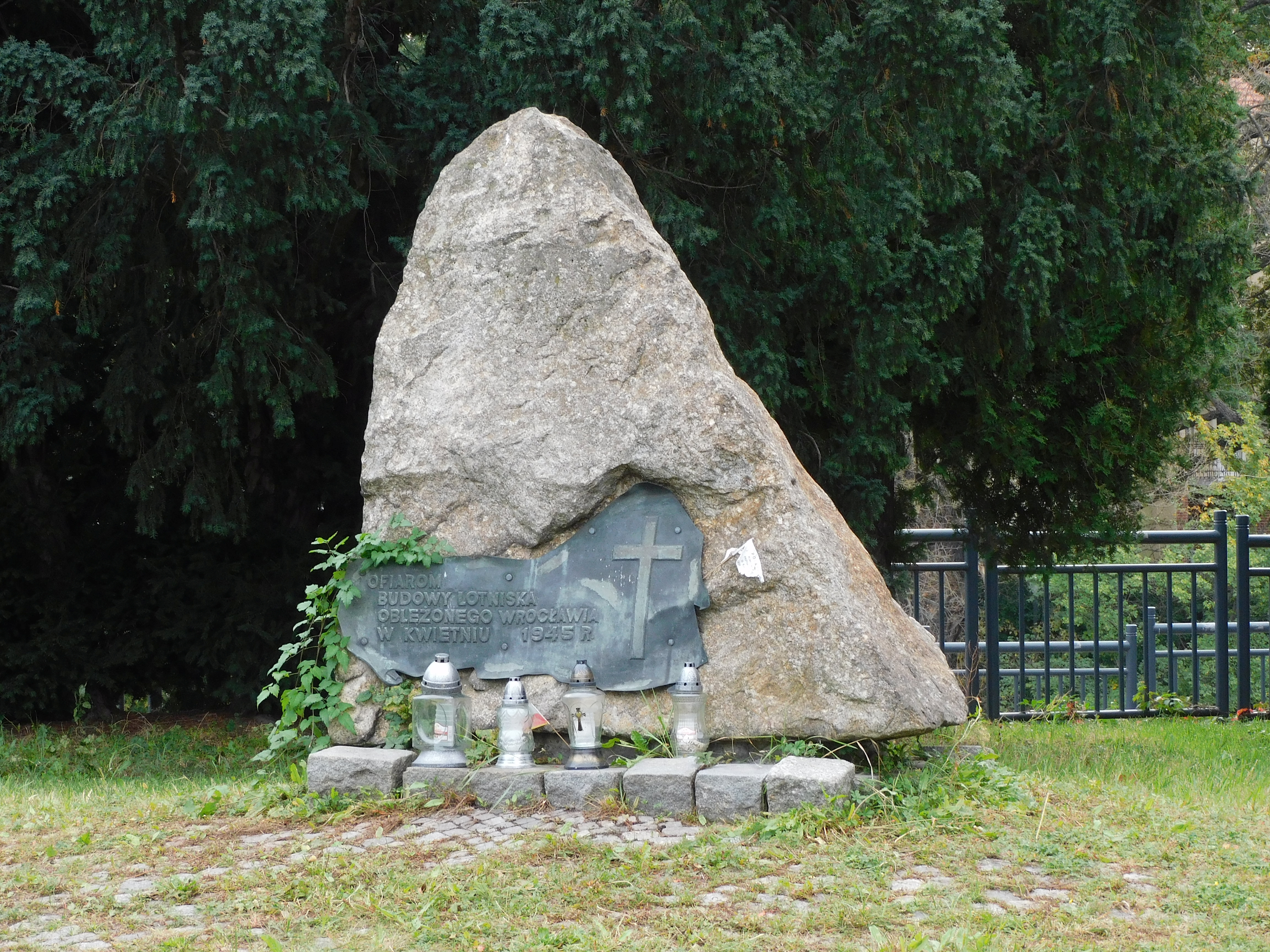
Memorial to those killed during the construction of a temporary airport in 1945

- 1945
  - January: evacuation of the prisoners of the Gross-Rosen subcamps to the main camp in death marches.
  - 20 January: Rheinmettal–Borsig forced labour camp dissolved.
  - January–April: Construction of a temporary airport, during which thousands of forced labourers were killed.
  - An AGSSt assembly center for Allied POWs established by the Germans.
  - February 13-May 6: Siege of Breslau.
  - April: Bombing of the Ausländer-Auffanglager forced labour camp; death of many prisoners.
  - May 7: Forced labour camp in Sołtysowice dissolved.
  - Polish Boleslaw Drobner becomes mayor.
  - Expulsion of Germans in accordance with the Potsdam Agreement begins.
  - June: Deportation of captured German POWs to the Soviet Union by the Russians.
  - 8 June: Nasz Wrocław, first post-war Polish newspaper of Wrocław begins publishing.
  - A Polish anti-communist resistance organization founded by Bohdan Gotowski nom-de-guerre Kanarek.

=== 1946–1990s ===
- 1946
  - Ossolineum relocates to Wrocław from Lviv.
  - Academy of Fine Arts and Academy for the Dramatic Arts established.
  - Wrocław Puppet Theater active.
  - Celiński Group, Frankowski Group and Młodzież Wielkiej Polski (Youth of Great Poland) Polish anti-communist resistance organizations founded.
  - 10 June: Wrocław Scientific Society founded.

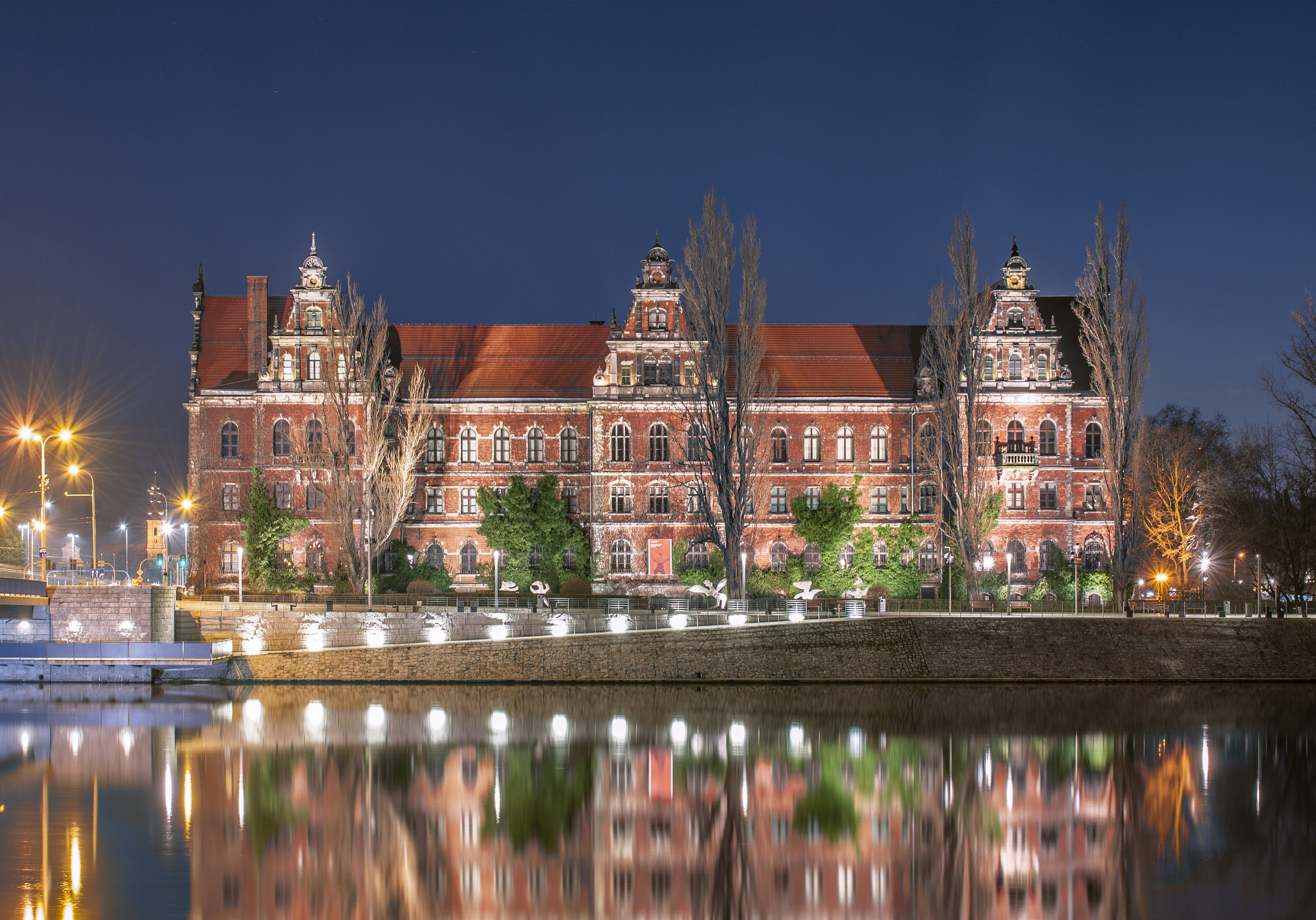
National Museum, Wrocław

- 1947
  - National Museum, Wrocław, and Trade College established.
  - A Polish military anti-communist resistance organization founded by Tadeusz Okoński, known as the Okoński Group.
- 1948
  - Iglica installed.
  - Rajczyk Group, Polska Organizacja Młodzieżowa (Polish Youth Organization) and Prywatna Sieć Kontrwywiadu (Private Counterintelligence Network) Polish anti-communist resistance organizations founded.
  - 17–18 July: Związek Akademickiej Młodzieży Polskiej (transl. Association of Polish Academic Youth) founded.
  - September: Anti-communist Polska Podziemna Organizacja Wojskowa (Polish Underground Military Organization) founded.
- 1949 – Młodzieżowy Ruch Oporu (Youth Resistance Movement) and Polska Armia Podziemna (Polish Underground Army) anti-communist resistance organizations founded.
- 1950 – Wrocław Medical University established.
- 1951
  - Bieńkowice, Brochów, Jagodno, Klecina, Lamowice Stare, Miłostków/Marzanów, Muchobór Wielki, Ołtaszyn, Oporów, Sołtysowice, Wojnów, Wojszyce, Zakrzów, Zgorzelisko villages become part of city.
  - Agricultural University established.
- 1956
  - Pantomima established.
  - Mass raising of medical supplies and blood donation for the Hungarian Revolution of 1956.
- 1958 – Śląsk Wrocław wins its first Polish handball championship.
- 1959
  - Wojewódzki Bridge constructed.
  - Memorial to the Victims of Nazi Terror erected near the former forced labour camp in Sołtysowice.
- 1963 – Wrocław hosts the EuroBasket 1963.

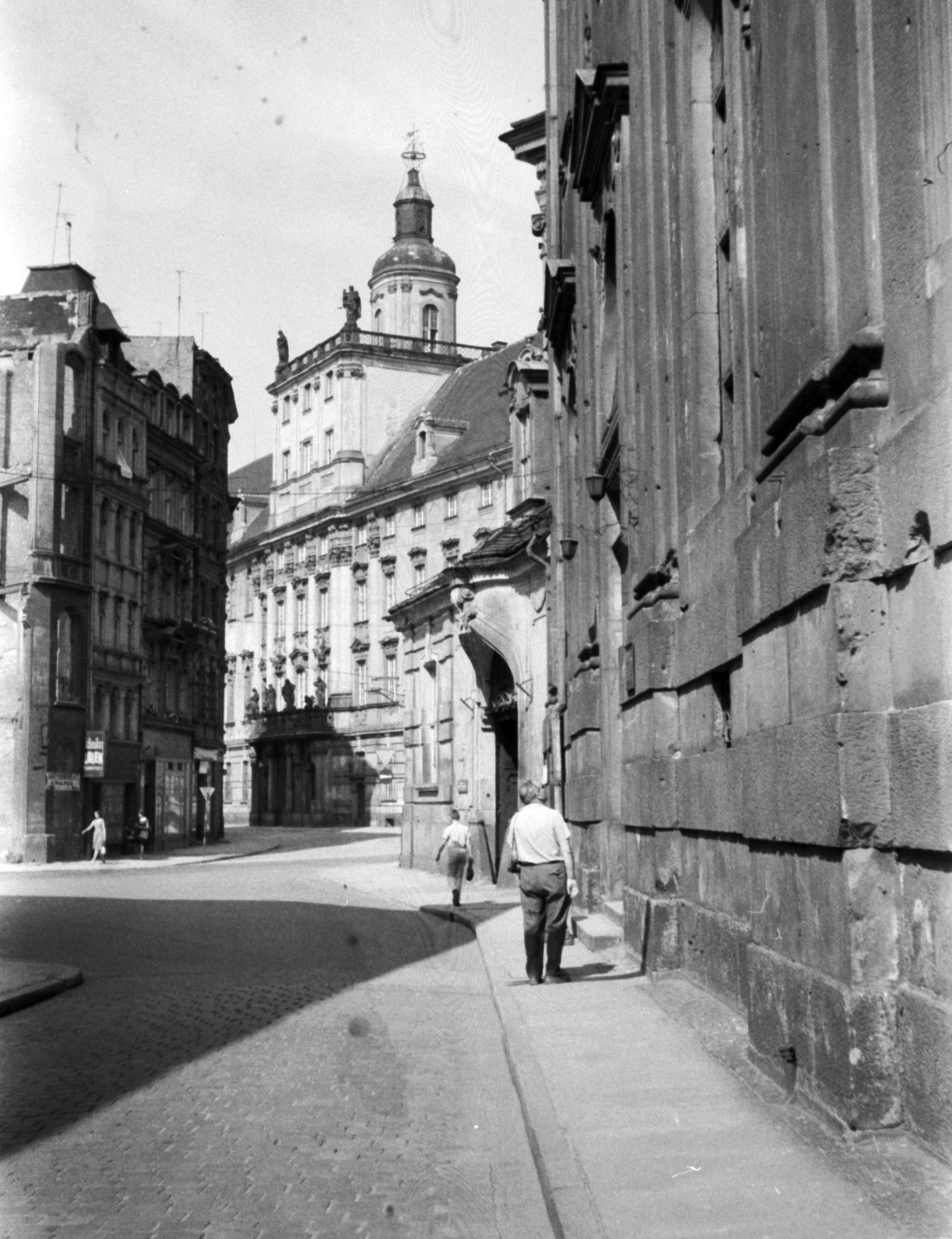
Wrocław in 1964

- 1964 – Unveiling of the monument to Polish professors from Lwów, murdered by the Germans during the occupation of Poland in 1941 (see also: Massacre of Lwów professors).
- 1965
  - Museum of Architecture established.
  - Teatr Laboratorium active.
  - Śląsk Wrocław wins its first Polish basketball championship.
- 1973 – 1 January: City limits sizeably expanded by including Jarnołtów, Jerzmanowo, Osiniec, Strachowice, Kłokoczyce, Lipa Piotrowska, Marszowice, Mokra, Polanowice, Rędzin, Świniary, Widawa and Żar.
- 1974
  - Nicolaus Copernicus monument unveiled.
  - Population: 565,000.
- 1975
  - City becomes capital of Wrocław Voivodeship.
  - Śląsk Wrocław wins its tenth Polish handball championship.
- 1977 – Śląsk Wrocław wins its first Polish football championship.
- 1980 – Gwardia Wrocław wins its first Polish volleyball championship.
- 1982 – Fighting Solidarity organization founded.
- 1984 – Juliusz Słowacki monument unveiled.
- 1985 – Raclawice Panorama re-opens.
- 1986 – Stefan Skapski becomes mayor.
- 1988 – Scientific Society of Environmental Law founded.
- 1991 – Sister city partnership signed between Wrocław and Breda, Netherlands.
- 1993
  - Śląsk Wrocław wins its tenth Polish basketball championship.
  - Sparta Wrocław wins its first Polish speedway championship.
- 1994 – Constitution of 3 May 1791 monument unveiled.
- 1995 – May 10: Wrocław hosts the first Speedway Grand Prix event in history, won by Tomasz Gollob.

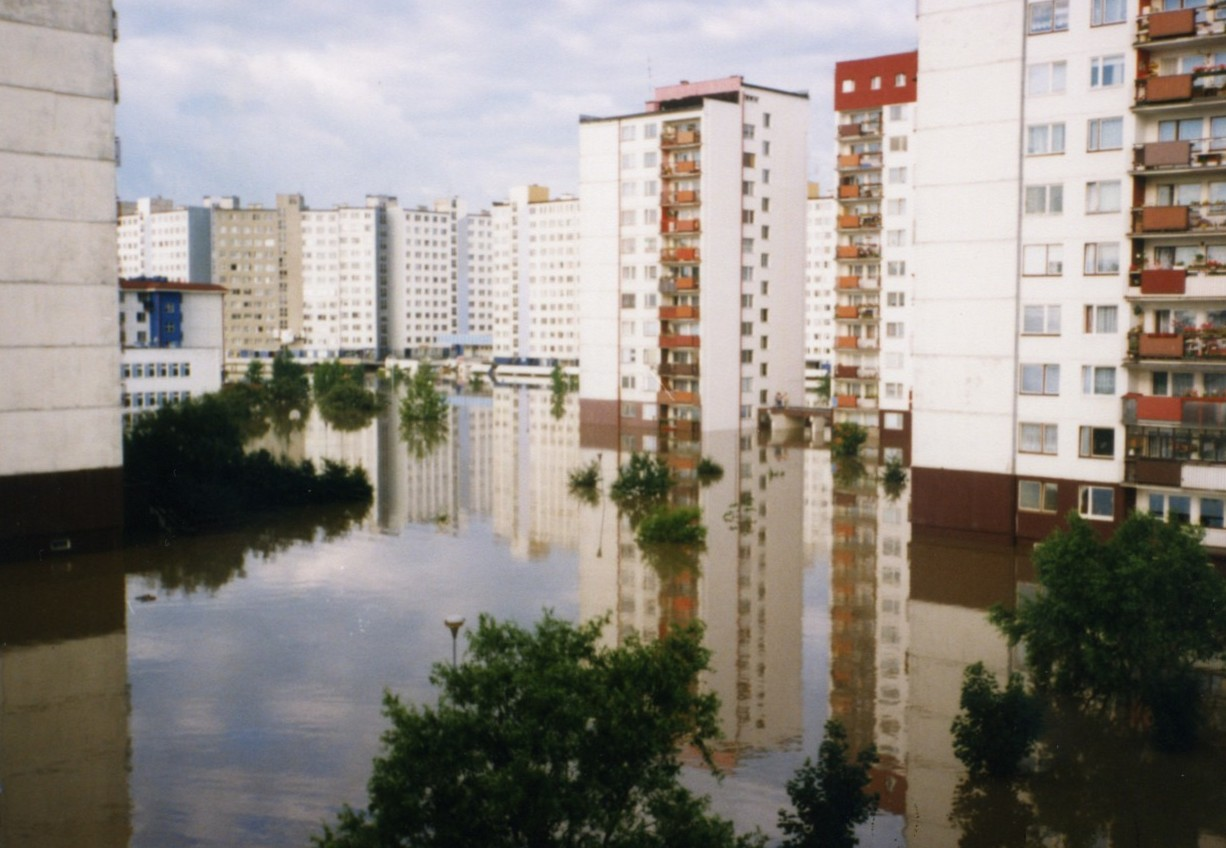
1997 Central European flood in Wrocław

- 1997
  - May: Visit of Pope John Paul II.
  - July: Millennium Flood.
- 1999 – City becomes capital of Lower Silesian Voivodeship.
- 2000 – May: Wrocław hosts the 2000 European Judo Championships.

== 21st century ==
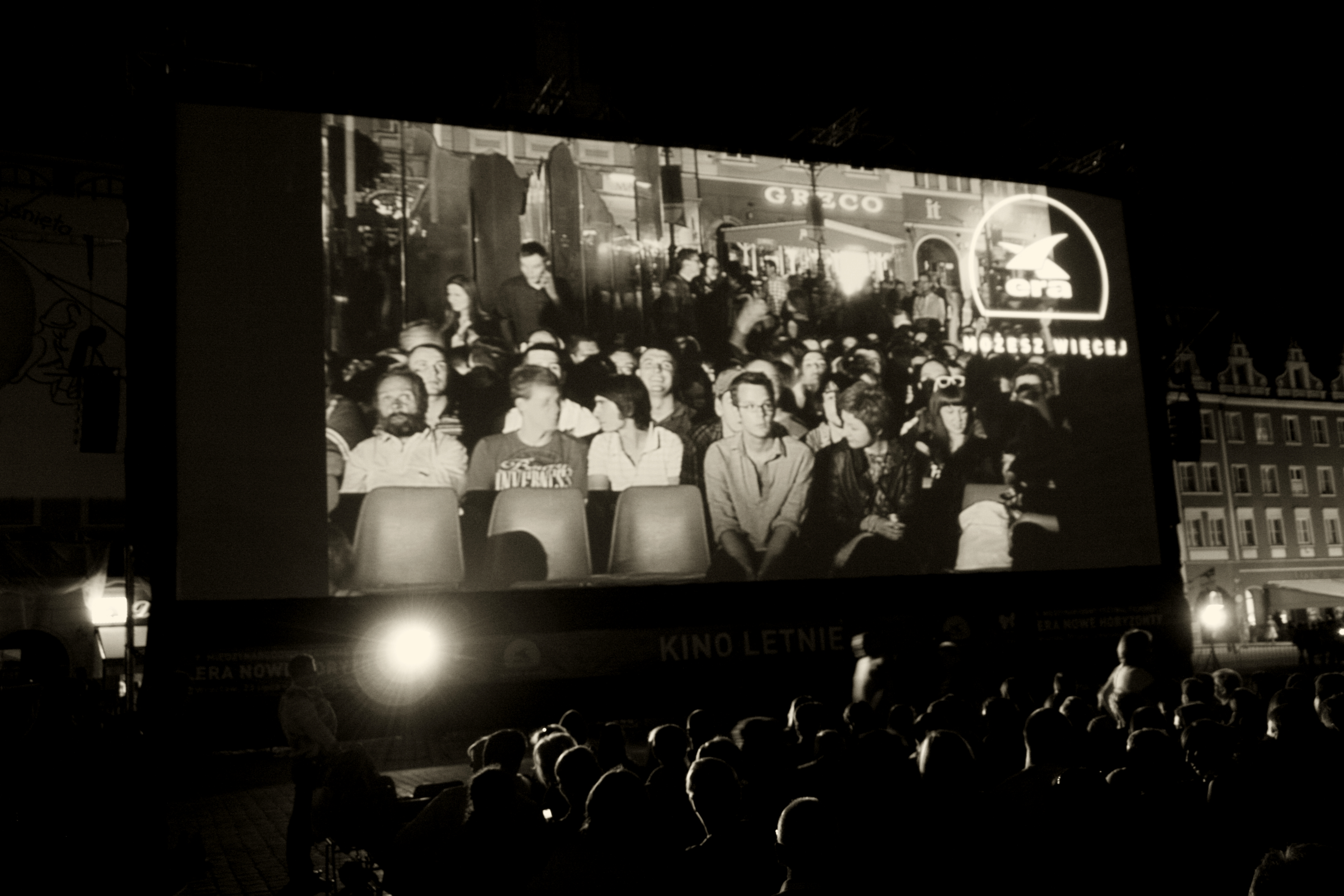
New Horizons Film Festival, 2009

- 2001 – New Horizons Film Festival begins.
- 2002
  - Rafal Dutkiewicz becomes mayor.
  - Land Forces Military Academy established.
- 2003 – March 30: Football riot.
- 2004 – Fryderyk Chopin monument unveiled.
- 2006 – Monument to the heroes of the Hungarian Revolution of 1956 unveiled.
- 2007 – Polish-Czech Scientific Society founded.
- 2009
  - April 25: Renoma department store re-opens.
  - June 4: Multimedia Fountain installed.
  - September: Wrocław co-hosts the EuroBasket 2009.
- 2010
  - July: Wrocław hosts the 2010 Acrobatic Gymnastics World Championships.
  - October: American Film Festival begins.

Stadion Miejski

- 2011
  - Redzinski Bridge and Municipal Stadium open.
  - May 25: Monument to Witold Pilecki unveiled.
  - Population: 631,235.
- 2012
  - June: City co-hosts the UEFA Euro 2012.
  - September: Khachkar unveiled.
- 2013 – Wrocław hosts the 2013 World Weightlifting Championships.
- 2014
  - August–September: Wrocław co-hosts the 2014 FIVB Volleyball Men's World Championship.
  - November: Wojciech Korfanty monument unveiled.

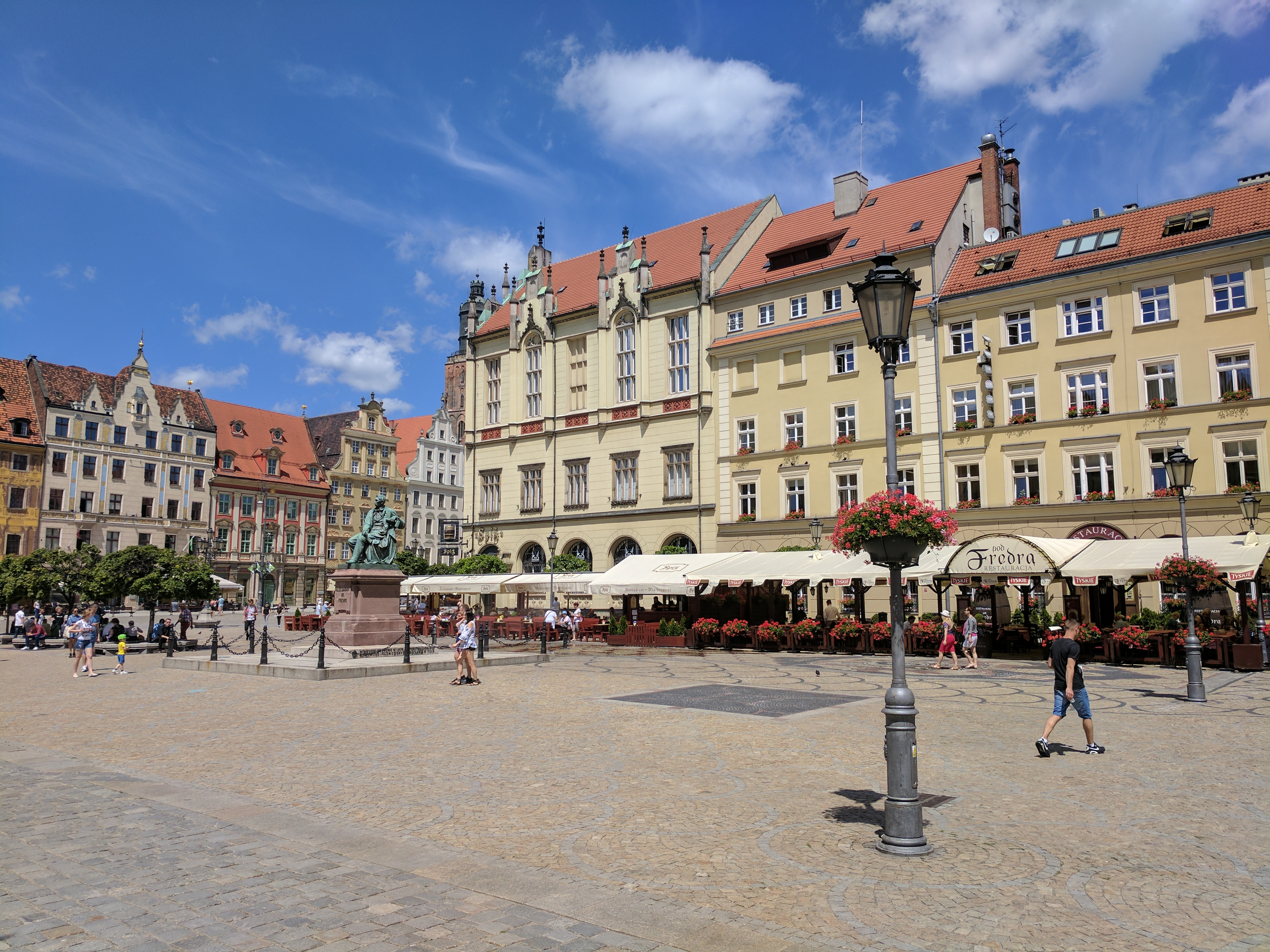
Wrocław Old Town in 2017

- 2016
  - City named World Book Capital by UNESCO.
  - January 12: Honorary Consulate of Latvia opened (see also: Latvia–Poland relations).
  - January 15–31: Wrocław co-hosts the 2016 European Men's Handball Championship.
  - April: Honorary Consulate of Norway opened (see also: Norway–Poland relations).
- 2017 – Wrocław hosts the 2017 World Games.
- 2018
  - June: Ignacy Jan Paderewski monument unveiled.
  - 3 October: Sister city partnership signed between Wrocław and Oxford, United Kingdom.
- 2019 – Honorary Consulate of Estonia opened (see also: Estonia–Poland relations).
- May 2019 – St John's Fair
- 2023 – June–July: Wrocław co-hosts the 2023 European Games.
- 2024 – September: Marszowice, Stabłowice and Złotniki neighborhood was partially flooded during the 2024 Central European floods, however, for the most part, houses and apartment blocks were spared thanks to anti-flood embankments built in the meantime.

== See also ==
- History of Wrocław
- List of mayors of Wrocław
- List of bishops of Wrocław
- Category:Timelines of cities in Poland (in Polish)
- History of Wrocław after 1945

== Bibliography ==
=== In English ===
- "Breslau", Northern Germany (5th ed.), Coblenz: Karl Baedeker, 1873, OCLC 5947482
- George Bradshaw (1898), "Breslau", Bradshaw's Illustrated Hand-book to Germany, London: Adams & Sons
- "Breslau" . Encyclopædia Britannica. Vol. 4 (11th ed.). 1910. pp. 498–499.
- Robert E Dickinson (1951). "Structure of the German City: Breslau". West European City: a Geographical Interpretation. Routledge. ISBN 978-1-136-25970-8.
- George Lerski (1996). "Wroclaw". Historical Dictionary of Poland, 966-1945. Greenwood. ISBN 978-0-313-03456-5.
- Piotr Wróbel (1998). "Wroclaw". Historical Dictionary of Poland 1945-1996. Fitzroy Dearborn. ISBN 978-1-135-92694-6.
- Laurențiu Rădvan (2010), "Towns in the Kingdom of Poland: Wroclaw and Krakow", At Europe's Borders: Medieval Towns in the Romanian Principalities, Translated by Valentin Cîrdei, Leiden: Brill, p. 47+, ISBN 9789004180109

=== In other languages ===
- "Breslau". Allgemeine Deutsche Real-Encyclopädie für die Gebildeten Stände (in German) (7th ed.). Leipzig: Brockhaus. 1827.
- "Breslau". Biblioteca geographica: Verzeichniss der seit der Mitte des vorigen Jahrhunderts bis zu Ende des Jahres 1856 in Deutschland (in German). Leipzig: Wilhelm Engelmann. 1858. (bibliography)
- Wrocław w liczbach 2000 (PDF) (in Polish). Wrocław: Urząd Statystyczny we Wrocławiu. 1999. ISBN 83-911967-7-1. Archived (PDF) from the original on 29 August 2020 – via Śląska Biblioteka Cyfrowa.
- Ludwig Sittenfeld (1909), Geschichte des Breslauer Theaters von 1841 bis 1900 [History of the Breslau Theatre from 1841 to 1900] (in German), Breslau: Preusz, OL 23360659M
- P. Krauss; E. Uetrecht, eds. (1913). "Breslau". Meyers Deutscher Städteatlas [Meyer's Atlas of German Cities] (in German). Leipzig: Bibliographisches Institut.
- Pater, Mieczysław (1976). "Polska poezja okolicznościowo-rewolucyjna we Wrocławiu (1812–1822)". Śląski Kwartalnik Historyczny Sobótka (in Polish). XXXI (2). Wrocław: Zakład Narodowy im. Ossolińskich, Wydawnictwo Polskiej Akademii Nauk.
- Pater, Mieczysław (1963). "Wrocławskie echa powstania styczniowego". Śląski Kwartalnik Historyczny Sobótka (in Polish). XVIII (4). Wrocław: Zakład Narodowy im. Ossolińskich.
- Institut für vergleichende Städtegeschichte, ed. (1989), Breslau, Deutscher Städteatlas (in German), vol. 4, ISBN 978-3891150009
- Wolfgang Adam; Siegrid Westphal, eds. (2012). "Breslau". Handbuch kultureller Zentren der Frühen Neuzeit: Städte und Residenzen im alten deutschen Sprachraum (in German). De Gruyter. ISBN 978-3-11-029555-9.
