= Aleksander Wachniewski =

Polish politician and engineer (1891–1976)

Government plenipotentiary in Wrocław
- In office 13 June 1945 – 15 February 1947
- Preceded by: Bolesław Drobner (as mayor)
- Succeeded by: Bronisław Kupczyński (as mayor)

Personal details
- Born: 1891
- Died: 1976 (aged 84–85)
- Resting place: Bródno Cemetery, Warsaw, Poland
- Party: Polish Workers' Party
- Occupation: Engineer, politician

Aleksander Wachniewski (Polish: [a.lɛkˈsan.dɛr vaxˈɲɛf.ski]; 1891–1976) was a Polish engineer and politician. He was a member of the Polish Workers' Party, and served as the government plenipotentiary in Wrocław, Poland from 13 June 1945 to 15 February 1947, which was an equivalent to an office of the mayor.

== Biography ==
Aleksander Wachniewski was born in 1891. He worked as an engineer.

Wachniewski was a member of the Polish Workers' Party, and on 13 June 1945, he was appointed the government plenipotentiary in Wrocław, which was an equivalent to an office of the mayor. He replaced Bolesław Drobner, who was dismissed following political conflict with the commander of the local garrison of the Red Army. Wachniewski remained in office until 15 February 1947, when he was replaced by Bronisław Kupczyński.

Aleksander Wachniewski died in 1976, at the age of 84 or 85, and was buried on 14 July at the Bródno Cemetery in Warsaw, Poland.

== Awards and decorations ==
- Gold Cross of Merit (1946)
