= Bronisław Kupczyński =

Polish politician (1908–1994)

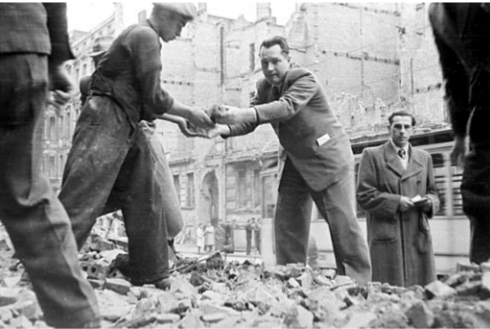
- Kupczyński helping at a construction site in Wrocław.

Mayor of Wrocław
- In office 15 February 1947 – June 1950
- Preceded by: Aleksander Wachniewski (as the government plenipotentiary)
- Succeeded by: Józef Barczyk (as the chairperson of the Presidium of the City National Council)

Personal details
- Born: August 26, 1908 Nowa Wieś, Kalisz Governorate, Kingdom of Poland, Russian Empire (now part of Poland)
- Died: December 29, 1994 (aged 86) Wrocław, Poland
- Resting place: Osobowice Cemetery, Wrocław, Poland
- Occupation: Politician

Bronisław Kupczyński (Polish: [brɔˈɲi.swaf kupˈt͡ʂɘ̟ɲ.ski]; 26 August 1908 – 29 December 1994) was a Polish politician. He served as the mayor of Wrocław, Poland from 15 February 1947 to June 1950.

== Biography ==
Bronisław Kupczyński was born on 26 August 1908 in the village of Nowa Wieś, then located in the Kalisz Governorate in the Kingdom of Poland within the Russian Empire, and now in the Greater Poland Voivodeship, Poland.

Kupczyński was a part of a Polish delegation sent by the government to the city of Wrocław after it was captured by the Red Army in 1945 during the Second World War. On 15 February 1947, he was appointed as the mayor of the city, replacing Aleksander Wachniewski. During his term, he oversaw the preparations to the Recovered Territories Exhibition, an art exhibition hosted in the city in 1948. He remained in office until June 1950, when it was abolished, and replaced by the chairperson of the Presidium of the City National Council of Wrocław.

In 1956, he co-founded the Association for the Development of the Western Lands, and was also active in the Society of Friends of Wrocław.

Kupczyński died on 29 December 1994 in Wrocław at the age of 86. He was buried at the Osobowice Cemetery in Wrocław.
