= Bogdan Suchodolski =

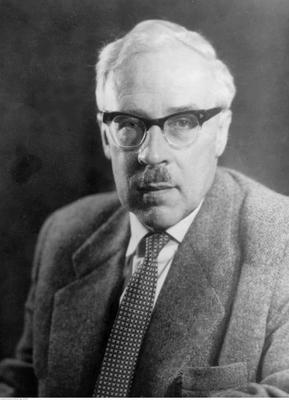
- Suchodolski in 1968

9th Term Marszałek senior
- In office 13 October 1985 – 3 June 1989

Personal details
- Born: December 27, 1903 Sosnowiec, Poland
- Died: October 2, 1992 (aged 88) Konstancin-Jeziorna, Poland
- Occupation: Writer, philosopher, historian and teacher

Bogdan Suchodolski (27 December 1903 – 2 October 1992) was a Polish philosopher, historian of science and culture and teacher. He served as a senior marshal of the Sejm from 1985 to 1989.

== Biography ==
Bogdan Suchodolski was born in Sosnowiec, Poland, on 27 December 1903. He was a professor at the University of Lviv in 1938 and at the University of Warsaw from 1946 to 1970. He was also university director of the Institute of Pedagogical Sciences 1958–68.

He was a member of the Polish Academy of Learning (PAU) since 1946, and later the Polish Academy of Sciences (PAN). From 1965 to 1970, he worked as deputy secretary of PAN, and from 1958 to 1974, he was chairman of the Academy of Pedagogical Sciences, in 1969–1980 a member of the presidium.

On 20 December 1982 Suchodolski was appointed chairman of the National Council of Culture, and from 1985 to 1989 he served as senior marshall in Sejm.

Suchodolski was the founding director of the Institute of Pedagogical Sciences at the Faculty of Education of the University of Warsaw for 1958–1968.

He received an honorary degree from the University of Berlin, Lomonosov Moscow State University, University of Padova, the Academy of Pedagogical Sciences in E Pedagogical University of Opole and Silesian University.

In 1968, he became a member of the Front of National Unity (FJN), and in 1983 became a member of its successor the Patriotic Movement for National Rebirth (PRON) created to demonstrate unity and support for the communist Poland's both government and governing party Polish United Workers' Party (PZPR) in the aftermath of the 1981–1983 martial law in Poland, in 1985–1989 a member and a Senior Marshal of the communist Poland's Parliament, in 1982–1989 the chairman of the National Council of Culture created by the martial law's main author Wojciech Jaruzelski.

Suchodolski authored papers dealing with education, history of Polish science and philosophy. He died in Konstancin-Jeziorna on 2 October 1992.

== Bibliography ==
- Wychowanie moralno-społeczne (1936)
- Uspołecznienie kultury (1937)
- Skąd i dokąd idziemy? Przewodnik po zagadnieniach kultury współczesnej (1943/1999), pierwsze wydanie pod pseudonimem R. Jadźwing.
- Wychowanie dla przyszłości (1947/1968)
- O pedagogikę na miarę naszych czasów (1958)
- Narodziny nowożytnej filozofii człowieka (1963)
- Rozwój nowożytnej filozofii człowieka (1967)
- Trzy pedagogiki (1970)
- Komisja Edukacji Narodowej (1972)
- Problemy wychowania w cywilizacji współczesnej (1974)
- Komeński (1979)
- Kim jest człowiek? (1985)
- Wychowanie mimo wszystko (1990)
