= Senior Marshal =

Senior marshal (Polish: marszałek senior or marszałek-senior) is an officer in the Sejm or Senate of Poland, presiding over the first sitting of the parliament house, appointed by the President of Poland. It is their role to conduct taking an oath by MPs and carry out election of the permanent leader of the house, who then takes the lead.

In the Sejm, senior marshal is appointed out of the oldest MPs, and it is also their duty to open the first sitting. Whereas in the Senate, the eldest senator-elect is nominated for the office and it is the President who starts the proceedeing.

== Senior Marshals of the Sejm ==
=== Polish People's Republic ===
- I Sejm – Lucjan Rudnicki (PZPR)
- II Sejm – Bolesław Drobner (PZPR)
- III Sejm – Bolesław Drobner (PZPR)
- IV Sejm – Bolesław Drobner (PZPR)
- V Sejm – Jarosław Iwaszkiewicz (non-partisan)
- VI Sejm – Jarosław Iwaszkiewicz (non-partisan)
- VII Sejm – Jarosław Iwaszkiewicz (non-partisan)
- VIII Sejm – Jerzy Ziętek (PZPR)
- IX Sejm – Bogdan Suchodolski (non-partisan)
- X Sejm – Zbigniew Rudnicki (SD), July 4, 1989

=== Third Republic ===
- I Sejm – Aleksander Małachowski (SP), November 25, 1991
- II Sejm – Aleksander Małachowski (UP), October 14, 1993
- III Sejm – Józef Kaleta (SLD), October 20, 1997
- IV Sejm – Aleksander Małachowski (UP), October 19, 2001
- V Sejm – Józef Zych (PSL), October 19–24, 2005
- VI Sejm – Zbigniew Religa (PiS), November 5, 2007
- VII Sejm – Józef Zych (PSL), November 8, 2011
- VIII Sejm – Kornel Morawiecki (WiS), November 12, 2015
- IX Sejm – Antoni Macierewicz (PiS), November 12, 2019
- X Sejm – Marek Sawicki (PSL), November 13 2023

== Senior Marshals of the Senate ==
=== Polish People's Republic ===
- I Senate – Stanisław Stomma (Solidarity), July 4, 1989

=== Third Republic ===
- II Senate – Jan Tomasz Zamoyski (ZChN), November 26, 1991
- III Senate – Jan Mulak (PPS), October 15, 1993
- IV Senate – Władysław Bartoszewski (UW), October 21, 1997
- V Senate – Andrzej Wielowieyski (UW), October 20, 2001
- VI Senate – Kazimierz Kutz (Independent), October 20, 2005
- VII Senate – Ryszard Bender (PiS), November 5, 2007
- VIII Senate – Kazimierz Kutz (Independent), November 8, 2011
- IX Senate – Michał Seweryński (PiS), November 12, 2015
- X Senate – Barbara Borys-Damięcka (KO), November 12, 2019
- XI Senate – Michał Seweryński (PiS), November 13, 2023

== See also ==
- Dean of the House
- Father of the House
