= List of mayors of Wrocław =

City mayor of Wrocław
- Coat of arms of Wrocław

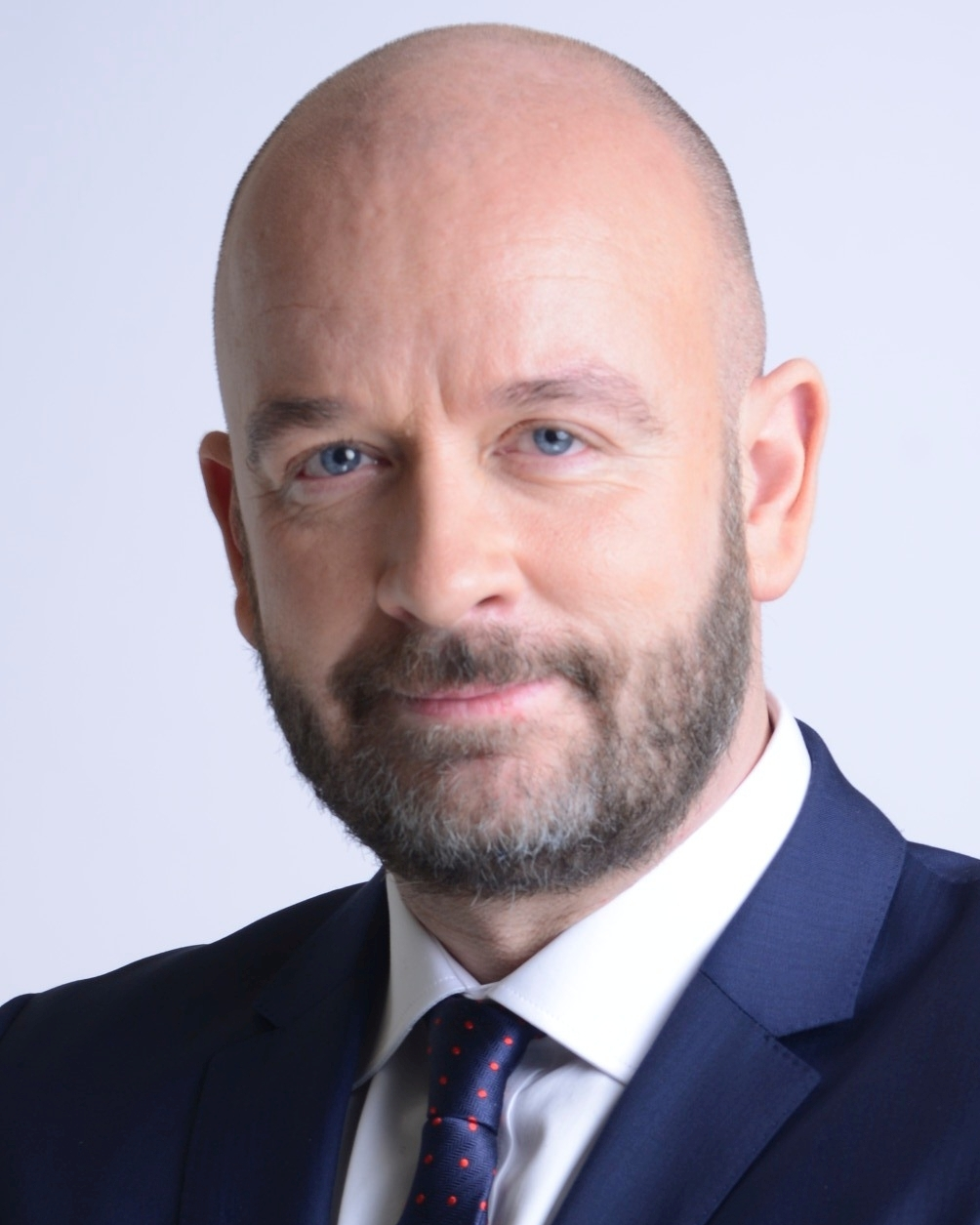
- Incumbent; Jacek Sutryk since 19 November 2018
- Inaugural holder: Bolesław Drobner
- Formation: 1809 (Breslau); 1945 (Wrocław)
- Website: wroclaw.pl

The city mayor of Wrocław (Polish: prezydent miasta Wrocławia) serves as the head of Wrocław municipal executive. Before 1945, Wrocław, known back then as Breslau, was governed by Bürgermeister.

== List of city mayors (1809-1945) ==
#	Image	Bürgermeister	Term of office	Party
1		Benjamin Gottlieb Müller	1809–1812	
2	Friedrich August Karl von Kospoth	Friedrich August Carl von Kospoth	1812–1832	
3	Gottlieb Donatus Menzel	Gottlieb Donatus Menzel	1833–1838	
4	Karl Gottlieb Lange	Karl Gottlieb Lange	1838–1842	
5	Julius Pinder	Julius Pinder	1843–1848	
6	Julius Alexander Elwanger	Julius Elwanger	1851–1863	
7	Arthur Hobrecht	Arthur Hobrecht	1863–1872	
8	Max von Forckenberg	Max von Forckenbeck	1872–1878	
9	Ferdinand Julius Friedensburg	Ferdinand Julius Ernst Friedensburg	1879–1891	
10	Georg Bender	Georg Bender	1891–1912	
		Paul Matting	1912–1919	
11		Otto Wagner	1919–1933	
12		Helmut Rebitzki	1933–1934	NSDAP
13		Hans Fridrich	1934–1945	NSDAP
14		Ernst Leichtenstern	1944–1945 kommissarisch	NSDAP

== List of city mayors (1945-present) ==
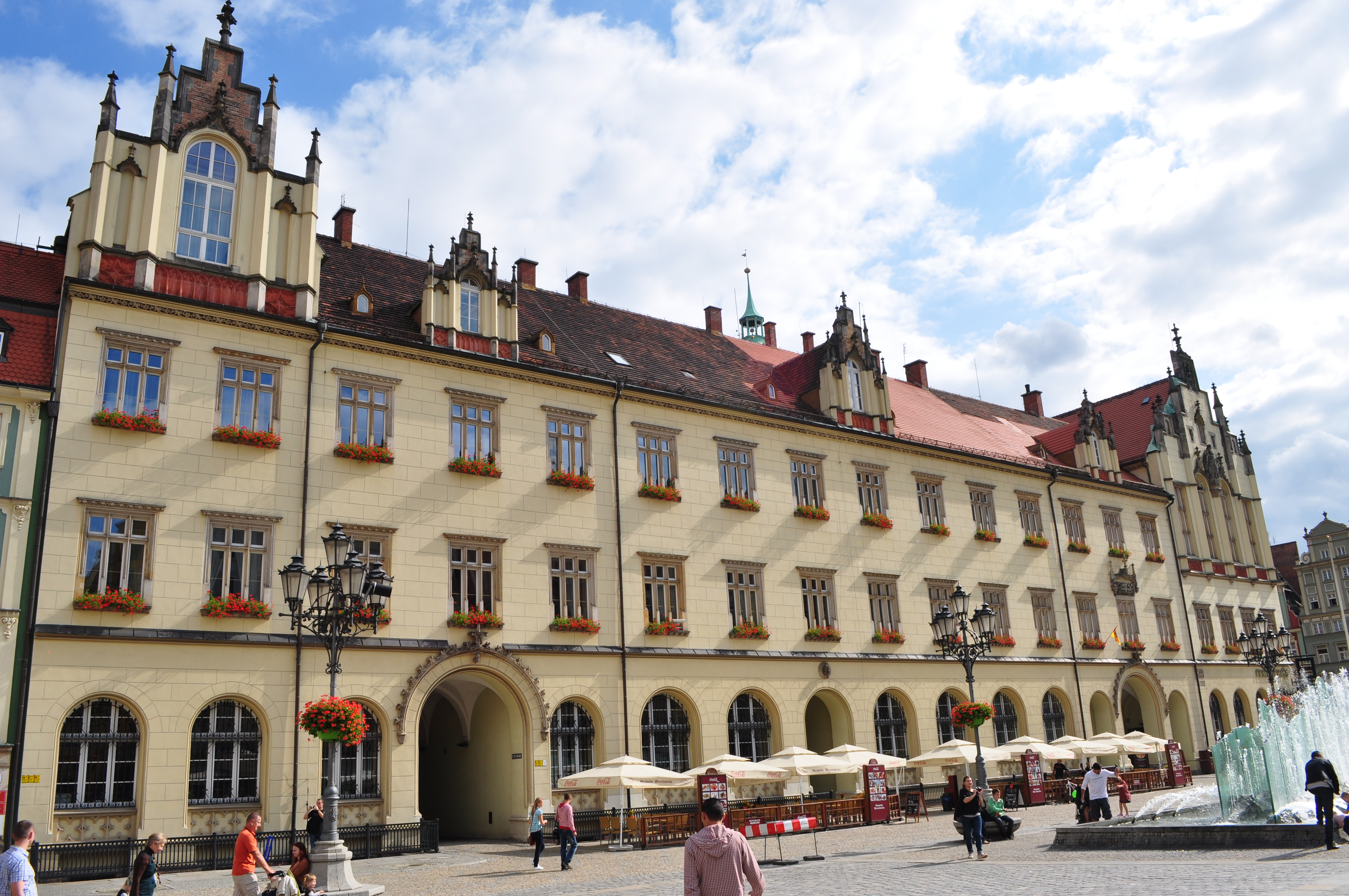
Wrocław New City Hall, the seat of the city mayor

1. Bolesław Drobner (14 March 1945 – 9 June 1945)
2. Aleksander Wachniewski (13 June 1945 – 15 February 1947)
3. Bronisław Kupczyński (15 February 1947 – June 1950)
4. Marian Czuliński (6 December 1973 – 31 May 1975)
5. Stanisław Apoznański (25 May 1984 – 13 December 1985)
6. Stefan Skąpski (26 March 1986 – 4 June 1990)
7. Bogdan Zdrojewski (5 June 1990 – 8 May 2001)
8. Stanisław Huskowski (8 May 2001 – 19 November 2002)
9. Rafał Dutkiewicz (19 November 2002 – 19 November 2018)
10. Jacek Sutryk (since 19 November 2018)

=== Chairman of the MRN Bureau ===
1. Józef Barczyk (June 1950 – November 1952)
2. Marian Dryll (November 1952 – April 1956)

=== Chairman of the Council ===
1. Eugeniusz Król (4 April 1956 – 2 February 1958)
2. Bolesław Iwaszkiewicz (2 February 1958 – 7 June 1969)
3. Stanisław Panek (7 June 1969 – 6 December 1972)
4. Marian Czuliński (6 December 1972 – 6 December 1973)

=== Voivodes ===
1. Zbigniew Nadratowski (1975 – 1979)
2. Janusz Owczarek (1979 – 1984)

== See also ==
- Timeline of Wrocław
