= Nowa Wieś, Gmina Sompolno =

Nowa Wieś
- Village
- Location within Poland
- Coordinates: 52°20′29″N 18°30′58″E
- Country: Poland
- Voivodeship: Greater Poland
- County: Konin
- Gmina: Sompolno
- Population: 540

Nowa Wieś [ˈnɔva ˈvjɛɕ] is a village in the administrative district of Gmina Sompolno, within Konin County, Greater Poland Voivodeship, in west-central Poland.
