= Olimp (organization) =

Polish anti-Nazi organization in Wrocław during World War II

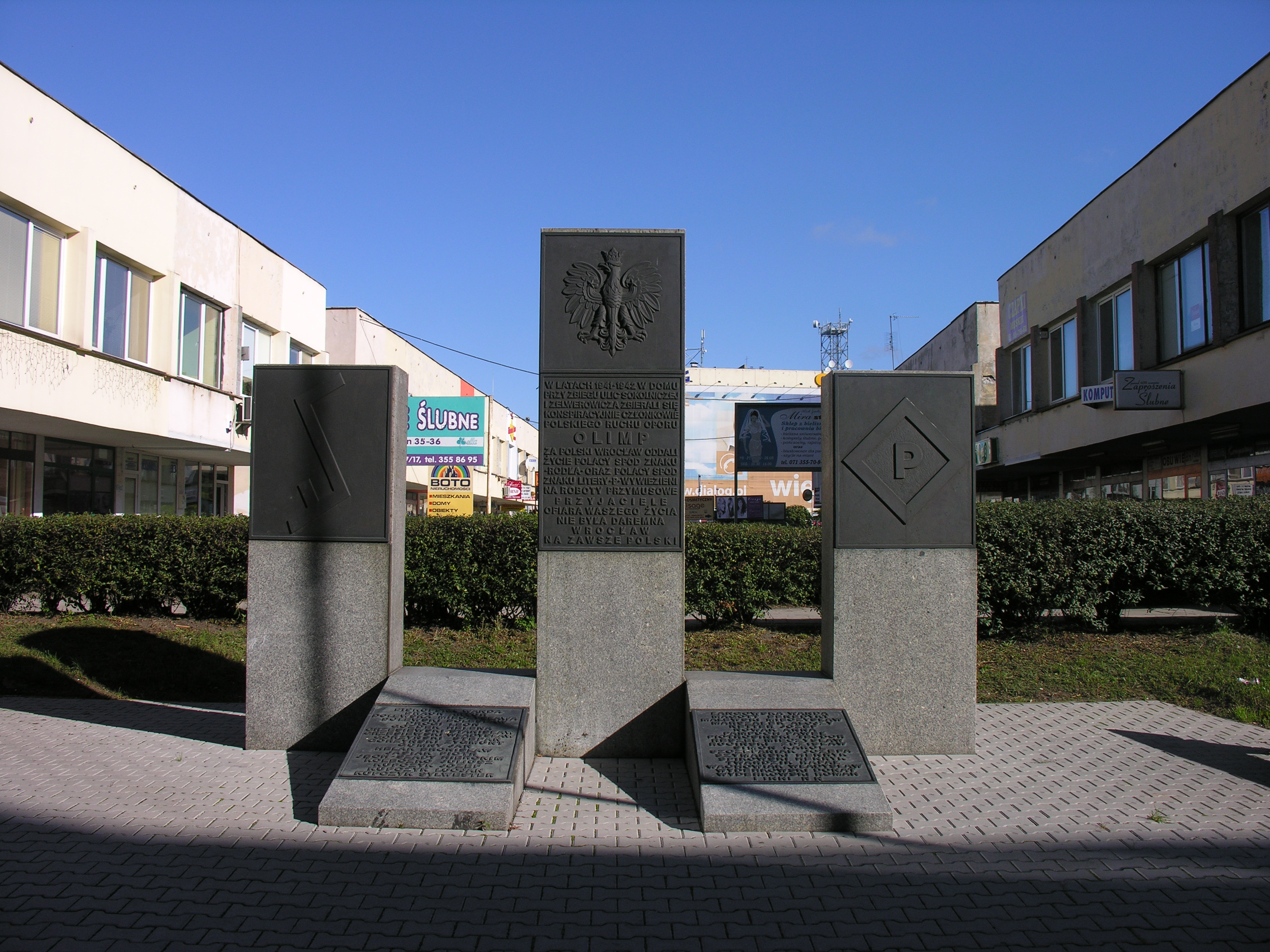
Monument to Olimp group in Wrocław, on the corners of the Zelwerowicza i Sokolnicza street. The inscription states: In the years 1941-1942 in the house on the corners of Sokolnicza and Zelwerowicza street members of the Polish resistance group Olimp gathered in secrecy. Poles from Rodło and Poles with the sign of P were deported for forced labour gave their lives for Polish Wrocław. Friends-your sacrifice was not in vain-Wrocław Polish forever.

Olimp was a Polish anti-Nazi resistance organization active in Breslau (Wrocław) during World War II.

== History ==
Olimp was formed in 1941 by members of the Polish minority in Germany located in Breslau and Poles from Upper Silesia. It later included Poles from Greater Poland (Wielkopolska) who were present in the city as forced laborers, as well as those who had escaped from nearby German camps. Some of the members had previously taken part in the September campaign, fighting against the Germans.

The organization was established for the purpose of gathering intelligence and information, carrying out sabotage actions and organizing aid for Polish slave workers. It was connected to the Katowice Inspectorate of the ZWZ (Polish: Związek Walki Zbrojnej, Union of Armed Struggle), a precursor organization to the Polish Home Army. In fact in some German sources of the time, Olimp itself is referred to as ZWZ.

About twenty members of the organizations were later sent to the Gross-Rosen concentration camp, forty to Auschwitz and ten to Mauthausen.

The main meeting place for the conspirators was at an apartment located on Jahnstrasse 19, at the crossing of the present day Zelwerowicz and Sokolnicza streets. Some of the members of the organization included Stanisław Grzesiewski, Rafał Twardzik, Wyderkowscy brothers Jan and Roman, Alojzy Marszałek, Edward Damczyk and Felicyta Podlakówna-Damczyk. The coming and going of so many people at the apartment was masked by the fact that it was located above a popular restaurant. The name of the organization in fact came from the locale - the apartment was located on the fifth floor of the building, and according to memoirs of Felicyta Damczyk, early on someone had commented that "it's far to this place like to Mount Olympus!". "Olimp" being Polish for Olympus, the name stuck.

The organization also helped to hide Poles who had escaped from transports to concentration camps, such as Gross Rosen. Ever more repressive measures against Poles by the German authorities led the organization to expand its operations. In addition to helping victims of persecution, Olimp began gathering information on German troop movements, rail and water transports and investigated the placement of German munitions and supply depots. Members also gathered documents on the production factories of Linke-Hoffmann and Famo-Werke and took photographs of objects of strategic importance. Much of the information was gathered by slave workers in various German factories, who passed it on to Olimp's activists. The reports were compiled and passed on to the Polish underground in Łódź and Kraków, from where they were sent through Vienna and Switzerland to England.

In 1942 the Breslau Gestapo in coordination with the Katowice unit, obtained information about the organization and its operations. A trap was organized and as a result 400 members were arrested. Men were transported to the prison at Łąkowa street, while women were taken to the one on Świebodzka. Both groups were then tortured by the Gestapo - some of the members suffering mental trauma as a result. After half a year of torture and interrogations, 20 Olimp members were sent to the Gross Rosen camp with death sentences, 40 were sent to Auschwitz-Birkenau and 10 to Mauthausen. Even those who did not have an explicit death sentence were selected out for specially severe treatment and almost all died shortly after their arrival in the camps, usually within a month. One Olimpian, Stanisław Ruciński, survived until May 1944 because the Gestapo believed him to be in possession of information about other underground units, and as such he was left alive until the conclusion of the investigation.

Out of the whole group only a few survived. Maria Wyderkowska lived through Auschwitz, while her brother in law, Jan, managed to escape and joined the anti-Nazi partisans in the Lublin region. Felicyta Podlak and Edward Damczyk also lived through the war and afterwards married in a Wrocław church. Thanks to the efforts of Felicja, a monument to the group was established in Wrocław honouring the group.

== Monument in Wroclaw ==
The monument commemorating the "Olymp" organization was unveiled in 1989. It was erected in the place where before the war the tenement house where the members of the organization gathered was located (then Jahnstrasse 19). The author of the monument is Janusz Kucharski.

In 2005, the Szczepin Housing Estate Council placed the monument under its care, commissioning cleaning and conservation works to restore it to its former appearance.

At the monument, local patriotic ceremonies are organized every year, commemorating the pre-war German Polish community and the forced workers deported to Germany during the war. It is present in city guides and is often visited during patriotic-educational events.

== Bibliography ==
- Polska grupa konspiracyjna "Olimp" w wojennym Wrocławiu (Polish underground organization "Olimp" in wartime Wrocław). Alfred Konieczny. Wydawn. Dolnośląskie, 1989
- Niewolnicy w Breslau, wolni we Wrocławiu: wspomnienia Polaków wojennego Wrocławia (Slaves in Breslau, free in Wrocław: memoirs of Poles in wartime Wrocław). Anna Kosmulska, Wratislavia 1995
