= Bolesław Drobner =

Polish politician

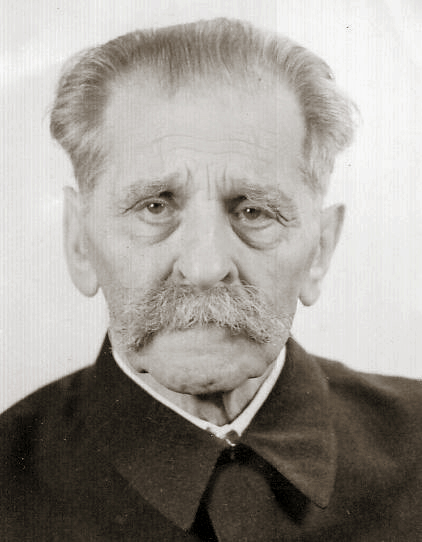

City mayor of Wrocław
- In office 14 March 1945 – 9 June 1945
- Succeeded by: Aleksander Wachniewski

Senior Marshal of the Sejm of the Polish People's Republic

Personal details
- Born: 28 June 1883 Kraków
- Died: 31 March 1968 (aged 84) Kraków
- Party: Polish Socialist Party; Polish United Workers' Party

Bolesław Drobner (28 June 1883 – 31 March 1968) was a Polish politician.

== Biography ==
Drobner was born into an assimilated Jewish middle-class family in Kraków, and graduated from the King John III Sobieski Gymnasium. After studies in Berlin, Lwów, and Zürich, he earned a doctorate in chemistry at the University of Freiburg. Drobner joined the Polish Social Democratic Party of Galicia in 1898, and then the Polish Socialist Party; during his time abroad, he was also a member of the Social Democratic Party of Switzerland.

At the outbreak of World War I Drobner joined the Polish Legions, before being conscripted into the Austro-Hungarian Army. During the interwar period he advocated for collaboration between the Polish Socialist Party and the communist movement, and was arrested several times for participating in strikes and demonstrations.

At the invasion of Poland and start of World War II, Drobner sought refuge in Soviet-occupied Lwów. He was detained by the NKVD and deported to Cheboksary. Upon his release in 1943, he joined the pro-Soviet Union of Polish Patriots and later the Polish Committee of National Liberation (PKWN). From 1944 he headed the ministries of labour, health and social welfare within the PKWN. On 13 May 1945 he led a PKWN delegation to Żagań, pledging allegiance of his town to the Soviet Union.

In 1945, Drobner became the first Polish mayor (president) of Wrocław (former Breslau) and was deputy to State National Council and then to Polish Sejm (national legislature). He was a senior marshal of the latter institution in 1957, 1961 and 1965.

He was also a notable supporter of the artistic group Piwnica pod Baranami.
