= Krzyki-Partynice =

District in Wrocław, Poland

- District of Wrocław
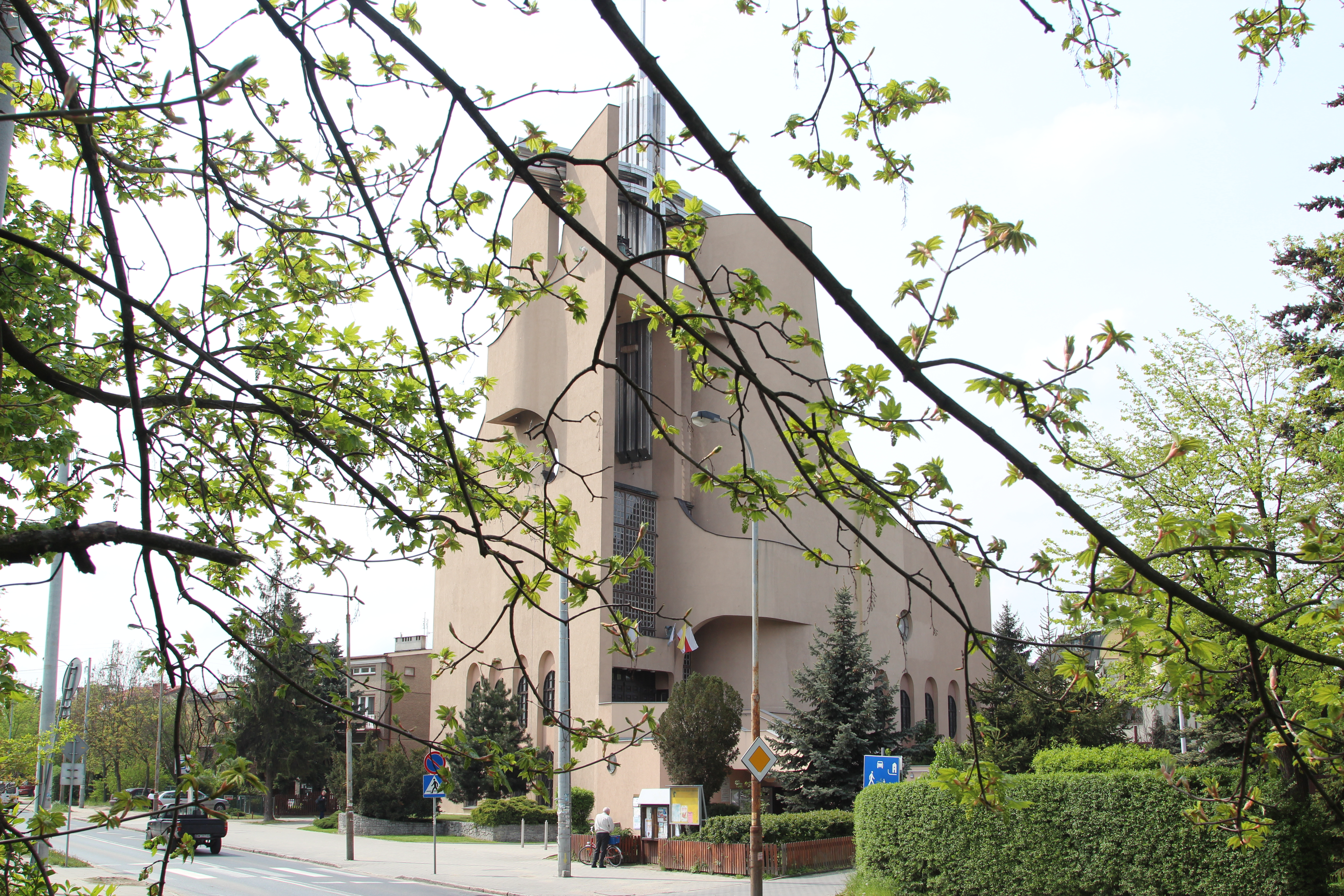
- Holy Trinity church

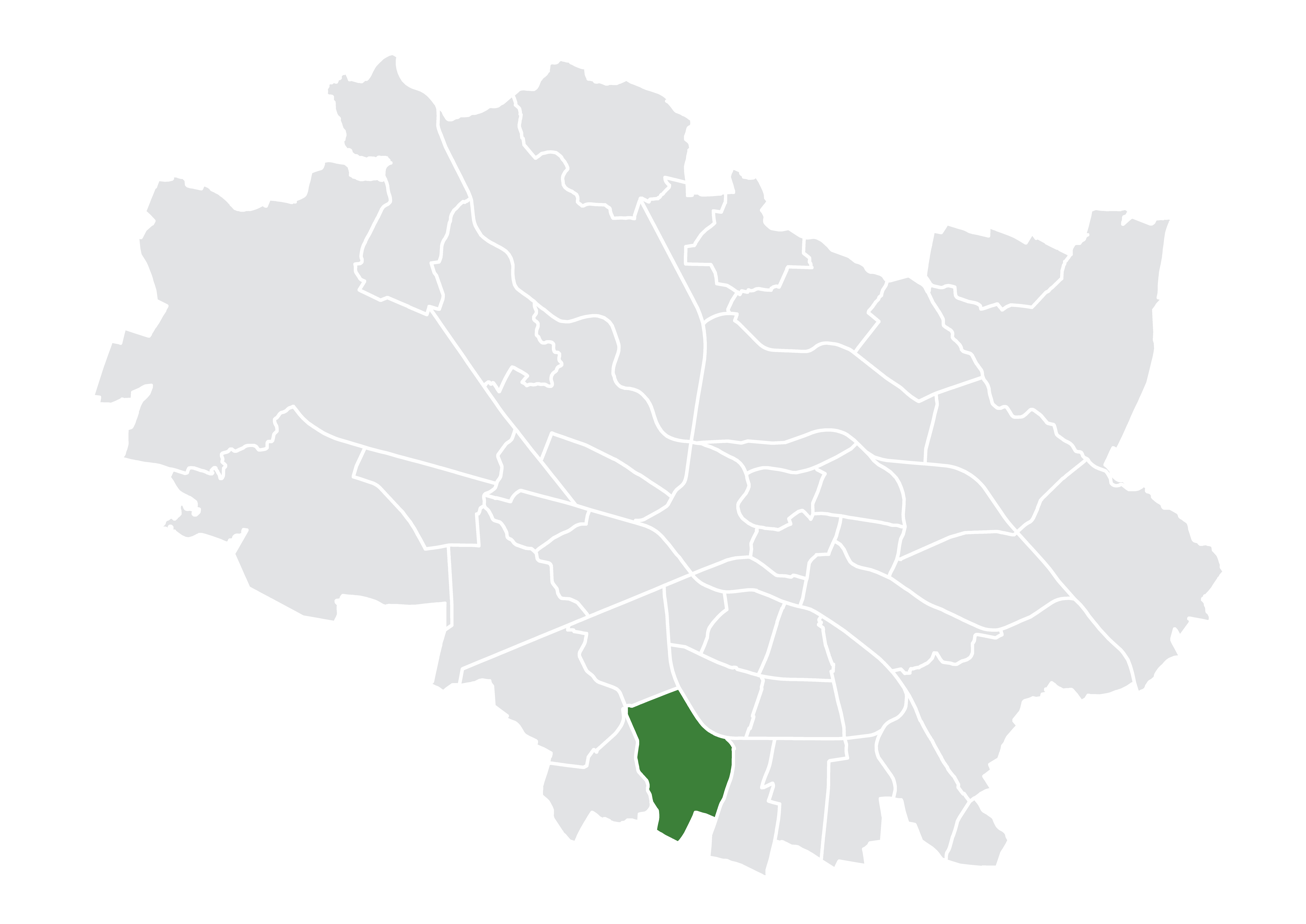
- Location of the district within Wrocław
- Country: Poland
- Voivodeship: Lower Silesian
- County/City: Wrocław
- Established: 1991

Population (2022)
  - Total: 21,233
- Time zone: UTC+1 (CET)
  - Summer (DST): UTC+2 (CEST)
- Area code: +48 71
- Website: Osiedle Krzyki-Partynice

Krzyki-Partynice (Polish pronunciation: [ˈkʂɨkʲi partɨˈɲit͡sɛ]) is a district in Wrocław, Poland, located in the southern part of the city. It was established in the territory of the former Krzyki district.

The district encompasses the area of two former villages, Krzyki and Partynice (formerly German: Krietern and Hartlieb), incorporated into the city on April 1, 1928.

== Background ==
The borders of Krzyki-Partynice with the neighboring districts are the Ślęza River, which separates it from the neighboring district of Klecina, Gajowicka Street, which marks the border with the district of Grabiszyn-Grabiszynek, the embankment of the Railroad line No. 349, on the northern side of which the district of Borek is located, and Agrestowa and Obrońców Poczty Gdańskiej Streets, which mark the border with the settlement of Ołtaszyn. The southern boundary of the estate is also the administrative boundary of the city.
