= Strachocin-Swojczyce-Wojnów =

District in Wrocław, Poland

- District of Wrocław
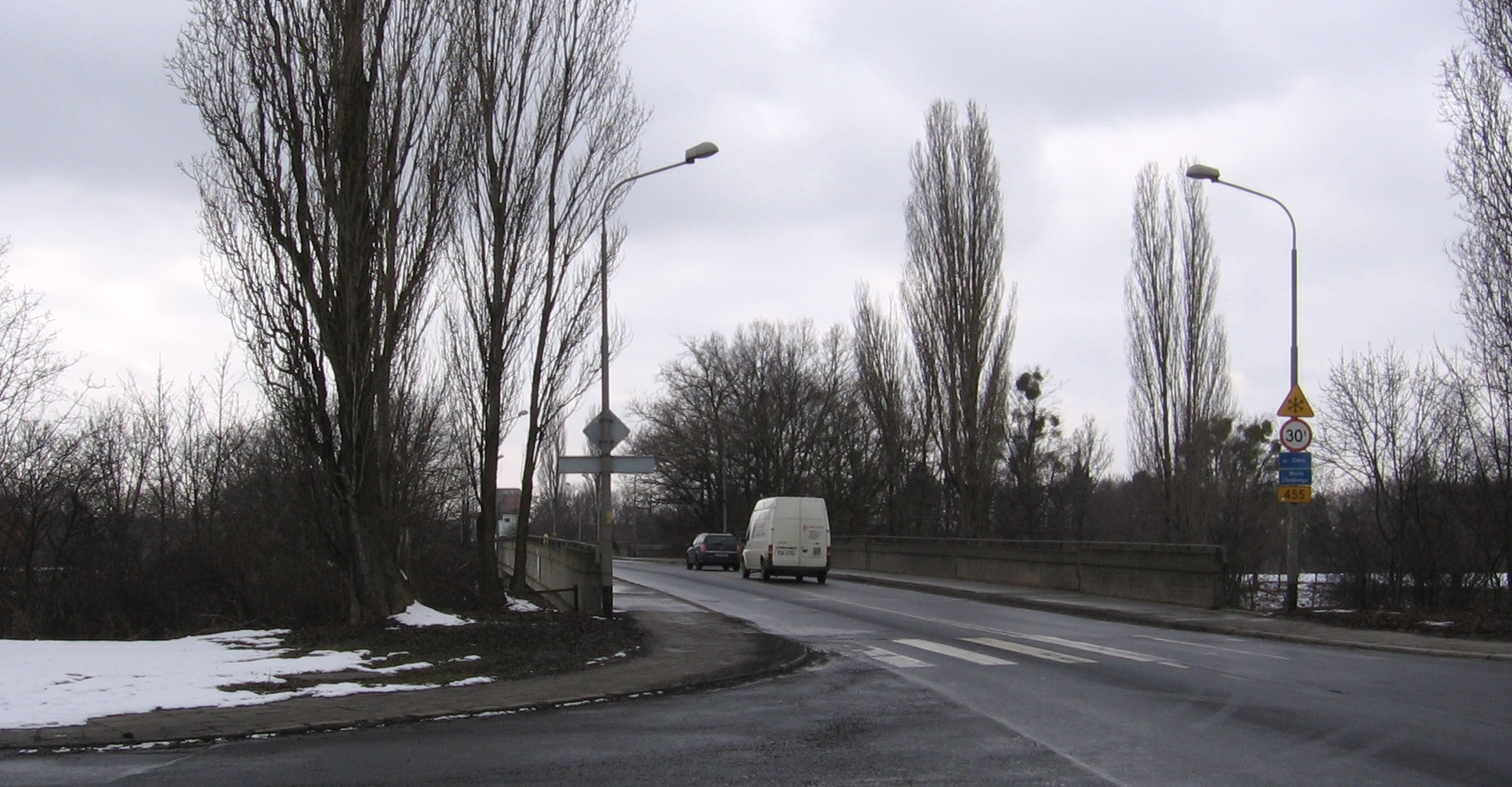

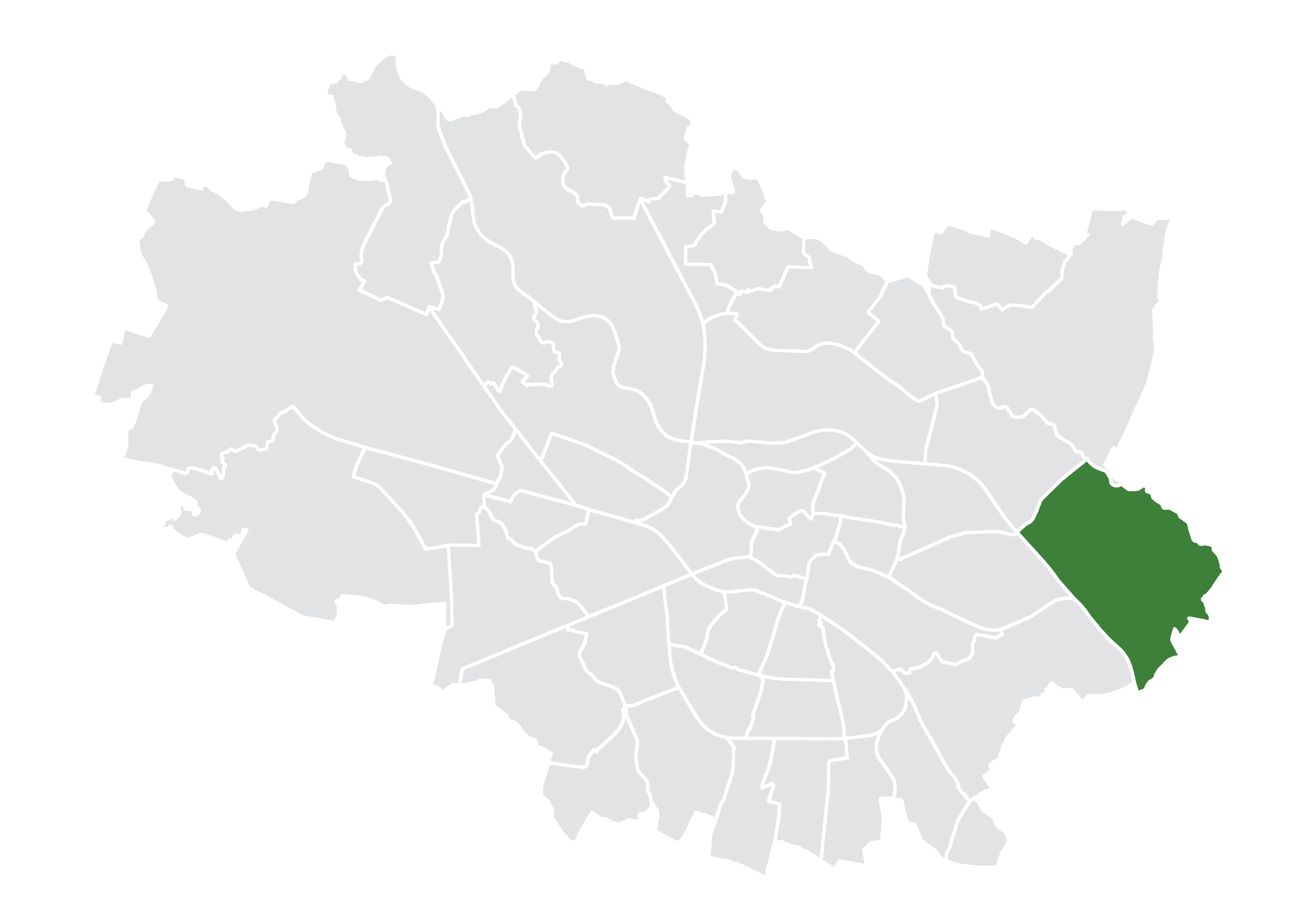
- Location of the district within Wrocław
- Country: Poland
- Voivodeship: Lower Silesian
- County/City: Wrocław
- Established: 1991

Population (2022)
  - Total: 8,414
- Time zone: UTC+1 (CET)
  - Summer (DST): UTC+2 (CEST)
- Area code: +48 71

Strachocin-Swojczyce-Wojnów (Polish pronunciation: [straˈxɔt͡ɕin sfɔjˈt͡ʂɨt͡sɛ ˈvɔjnuf]) is a district in Wrocław, Poland, located in the eastern part of the city. It was established in the territory of the former Psie Pole district.

The district consists of the neighborhoods of Swojczyce and Strachocin, incorporated into the city on April 1, 1928, and Wojnów and Popiele, incorporated into the city on January 1, 1951.

In 1991, after reforms in the administrative division of Wrocław, Strachocin-Swojczyce-Wojnów became one of the city's 48 districts.
