= Tarnogaj =

District in Wrocław, Poland

- District of Wrocław
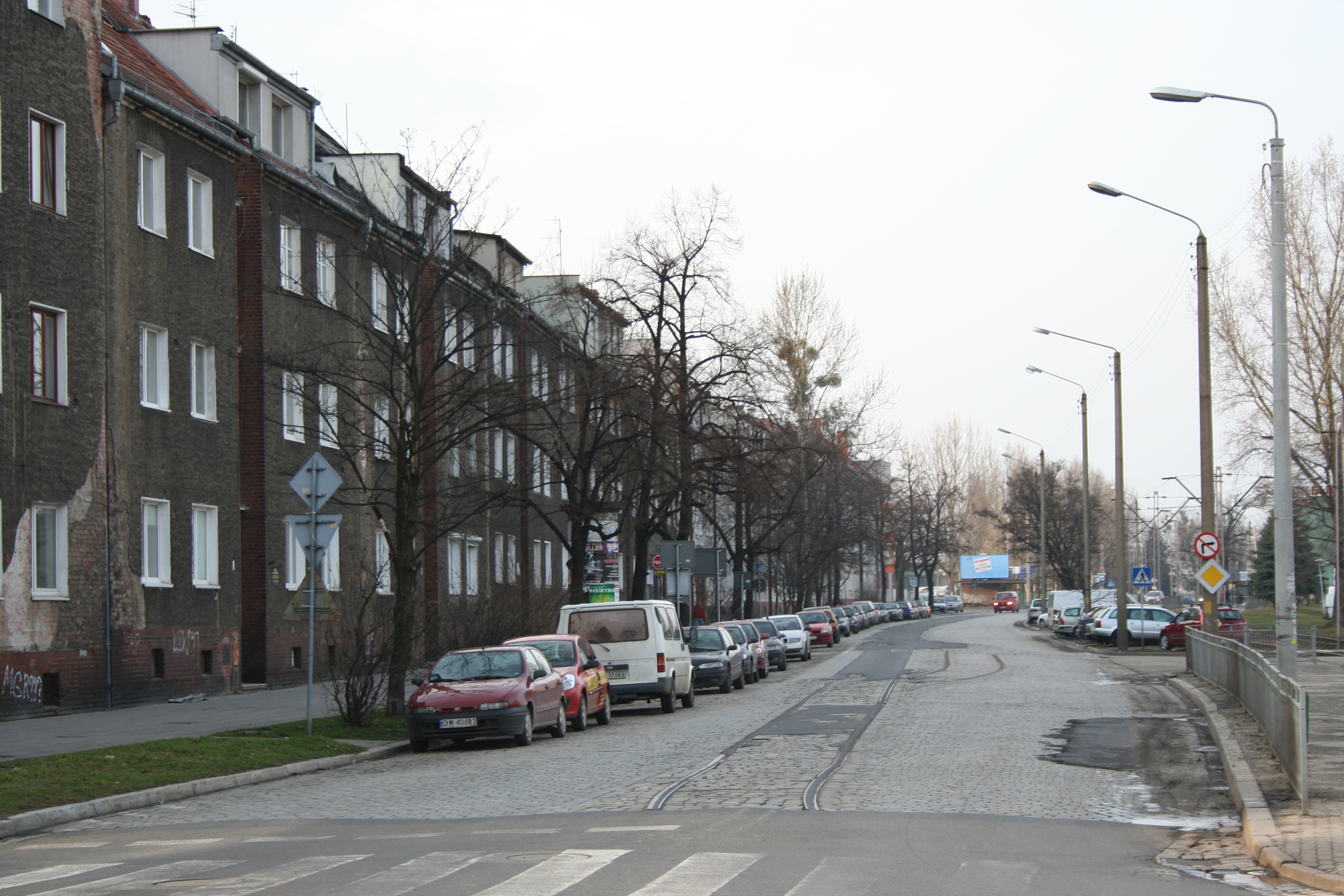

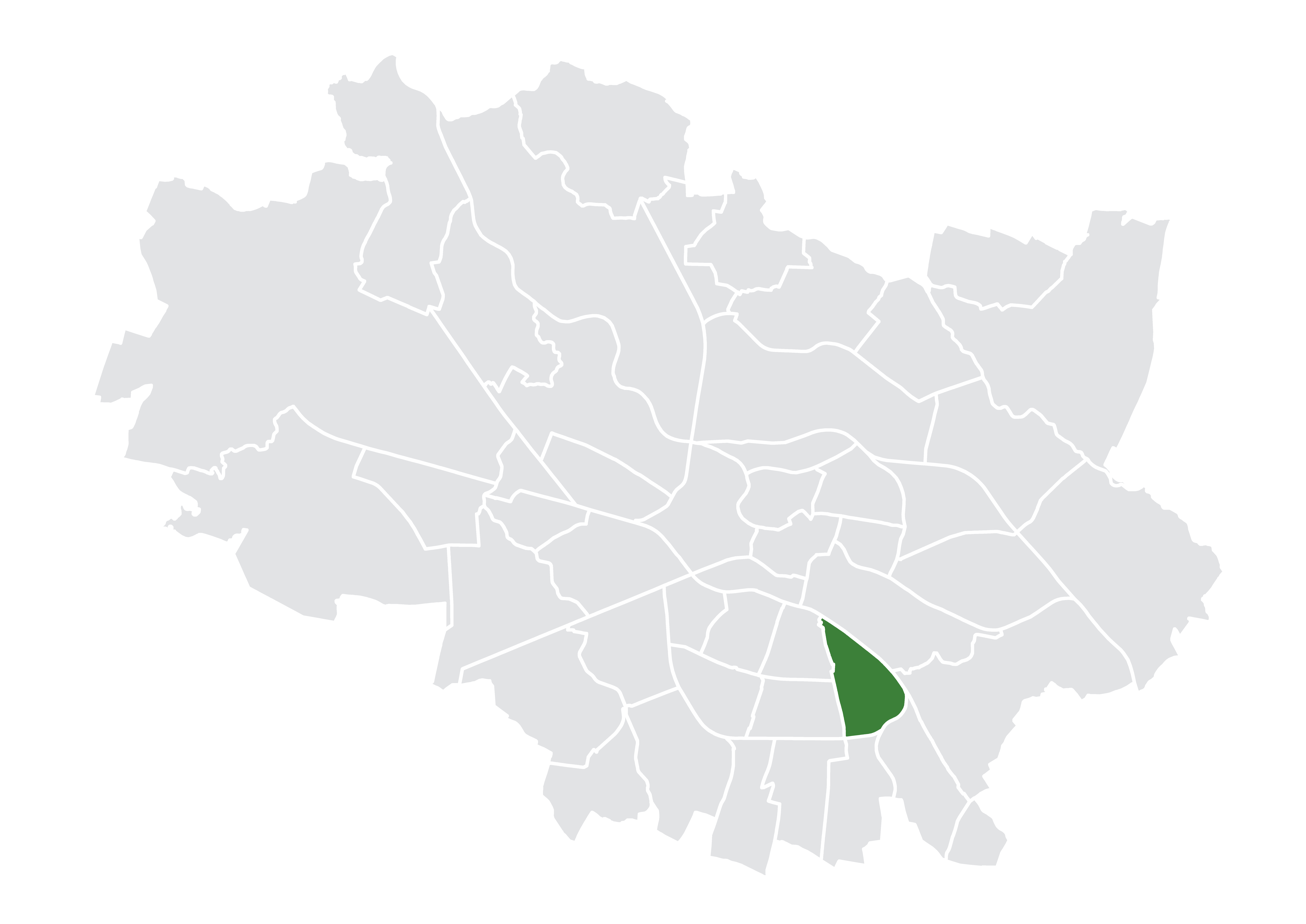
- Location of Tarnogaj within Wrocław
- Country: Poland
- Voivodeship: Lower Silesian
- County/City: Wrocław
- First mentioned: 1288
- Incorporated into the city: 1904
- Established the modern-day district: 1991

Population (2022)
  - Total: 9,108
- Time zone: UTC+1 (CET)
  - Summer (DST): UTC+2 (CEST)
- Area code: +48 71
- Website: Osiedle Tarnogaj

Tarnogaj (Polish pronunciation: [tarˈnɔgaj], German: Dürrgoy, [ˈdʏɐ̯gɔɪ̯]) is a district in Wrocław, Poland, located in the central part of the city. It was established in the territory of the former Krzyki district.

== Name ==
According to German linguist Heinrich Adamy, the name of the village derives from the Polish word 'gaj' ('grove'). In his work on local names in Silesia, published in 1888 in Breslau, he mentions Gay as the oldest name of the locality, giving its meaning as "trockenes Wäldchen" ("little, dry forest"). The original name was later phonetically Germanized by the Germans to Dürrgoy, losing its original meaning.

The settlement was mentioned by the names Gay (1311), Gaya (1316), Gay (1320, 1374), Dirngay (1579), Dürgay (1638), Dirgai (1669), and Dürrgoy (1904). In 1945, following the war, its name was briefly changed to Cierniogaj. Since 1948, it has been known as Tarnogaj.

== History ==
The earliest records of the settlement can be traced back to 1288. The village has a history of ownership, dating back to 1336 when it was received by Jan of Głogów from Margaret, the widow of Peter of Głogów. Over the years, it changed hands and was eventually owned by the Wrocław missionaries from the Holy Cross from 1385 until secularization in 1810.

By 1845, its population had grown to 230. During this time, the village thrived, with 144 residents engaged in growing vegetables for Breslau, and living in 21 houses. The Lower Silesian District Gasworks, located in Dürrgoy, has been in operation since the early 1900s to supply the city.

The settlement was incorporated into Breslau (Wrocław) in 1904.

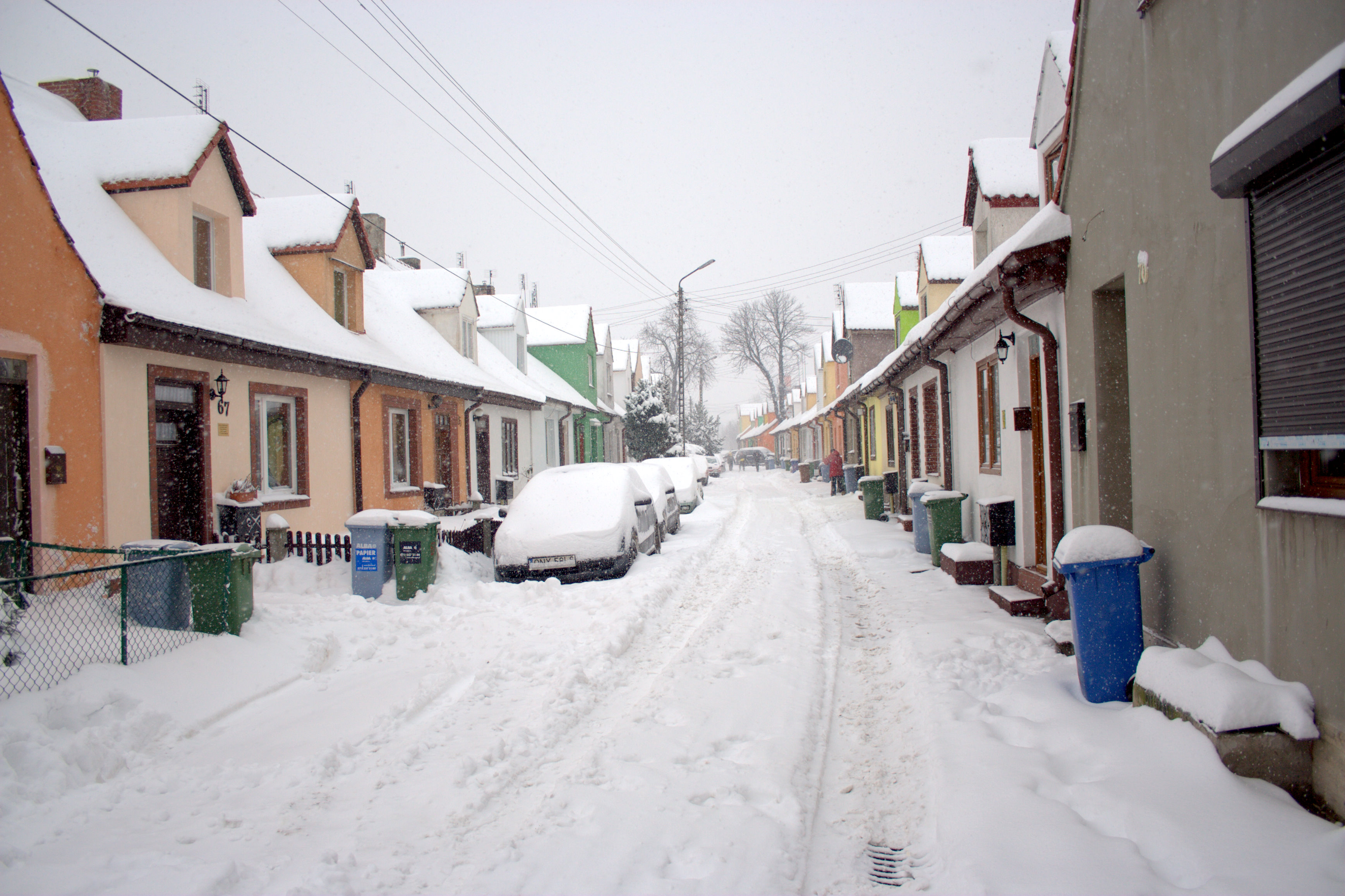
Modernist estate for gas plant workers

To the south of the district a housing complex was built in 1919 for the employees of the gas plant. The complex covers an area of 11 hectares and is rectangular in shape, divided by three parallel streets. The designers aimed to create the appearance of a colony of single-family houses with gardens, surrounded by a screen of taller buildings.

In March 1933, the Breslau-Dürrgoy concentration camp was established in the district by the Nazis for political prisoners. It was closed later that same year. During World War II, the E125 forced labour subcamp of the Stalag VIII-B/344 prisoner-of-war camp for Allied POWs was located in the district. During the siege of Breslau in 1945, the mill that had been present since the Middle Ages was destroyed due to the intense fighting in the area, which caused significant damage.

In 1991, after reforms in the administrative division of Wrocław, Tarnogaj became one of the city's 48 districts.

As a result of the significant war damage, the district is undergoing a process of modernization, which includes the construction of contemporary multi-family apartment blocks in addition to the original settlements. A significant portion of the district is railroad land.
