= Districts of Wrocław =

Administrative districts of Wrocław, Poland

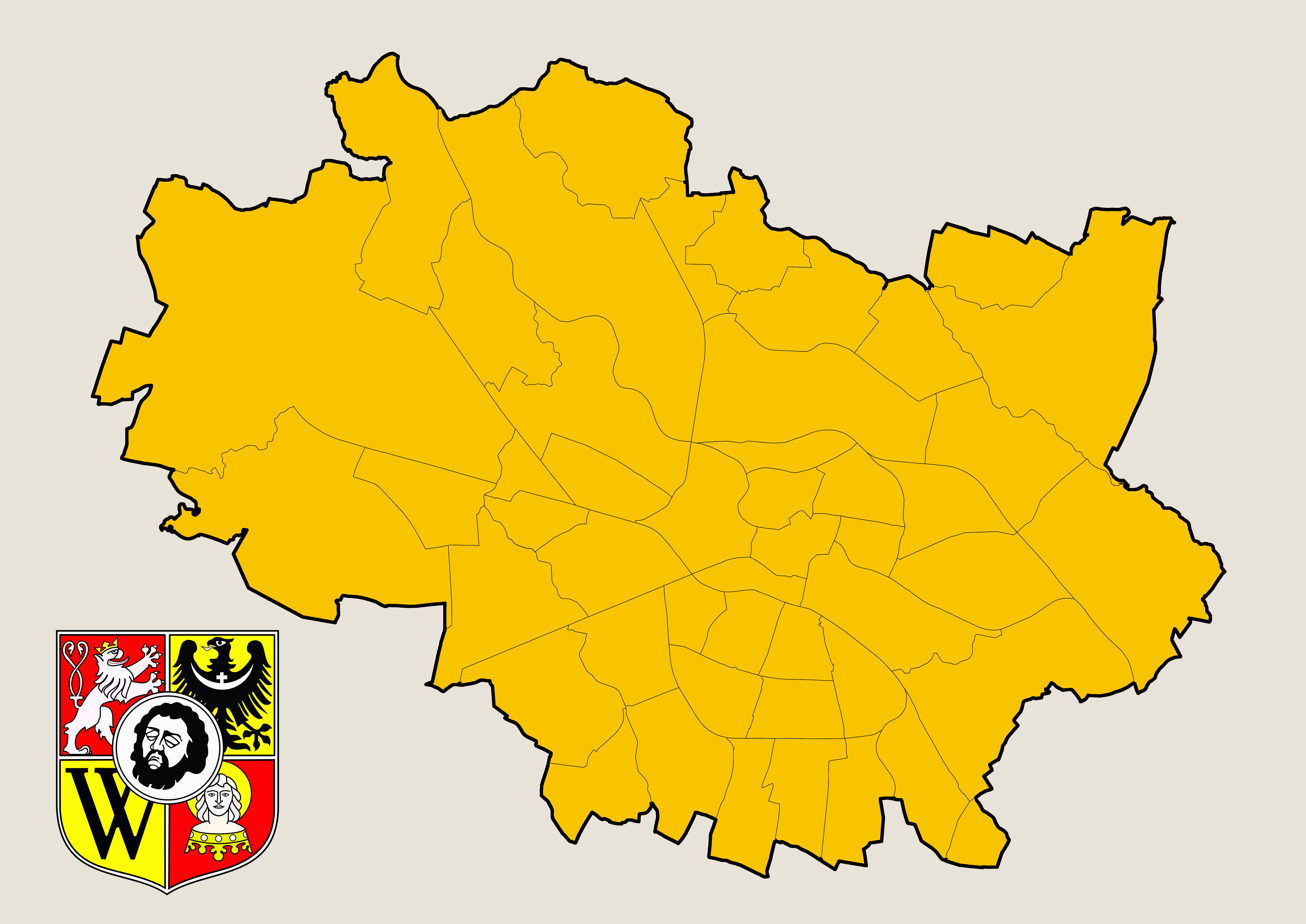
- The forty-eight Wrocław districts
- Category: Osiedla
- Location: Wrocław, Poland
- Created by: Resolution XX/110/91 of the City Council of Wrocław
- Created: March 21, 1991
- Number: 48
- Populations: 500–35,000
- Government: District council (Rada osiedla)

The districts of Wrocław (Polish: osiedla Wrocławia) are the 48 local authority districts that make up the administrative area of Wrocław, Poland. Each is governed by a district council (rada osiedla). The present Wrocław districts were all created on March 21, 1991 by the Resolution XX/110/91 of the City Council of Wrocław and are a type of local government district.

On February 13, 2016, the Resolution XX/419/16 of the City Council of Wrocław revised and established unambiguous and precise boundaries of Wrocław's districts, defining them in digital form.

The current division system replaced the one from 1952, when Wrocław was divided into five main boroughs (dzielnice). Although they were abolished in 1991 and have not existed as public administration units since then, areas of borders and names similar/identical to the former districts still exist in the practice of operation of various types of authorities and administrations (e.g. as divisions of territorial competencies of courts, prosecutors' offices, tax offices, etc.).

The former settlements that were incorporated into the city form some of Wrocław's current districts. Some districts may also consist of multiple former neighborhoods that have been combined into a larger district. A few, such as Grunwald Square or Powstańców Śląskich, were established and named after streets in the area.

As of 2022, Leśnica is the most populous district in the city, with a population of 31,971 people living in the area. The least populous district in Wrocław is Bieńkowice, with a population of 577 inhabitants.

== List ==
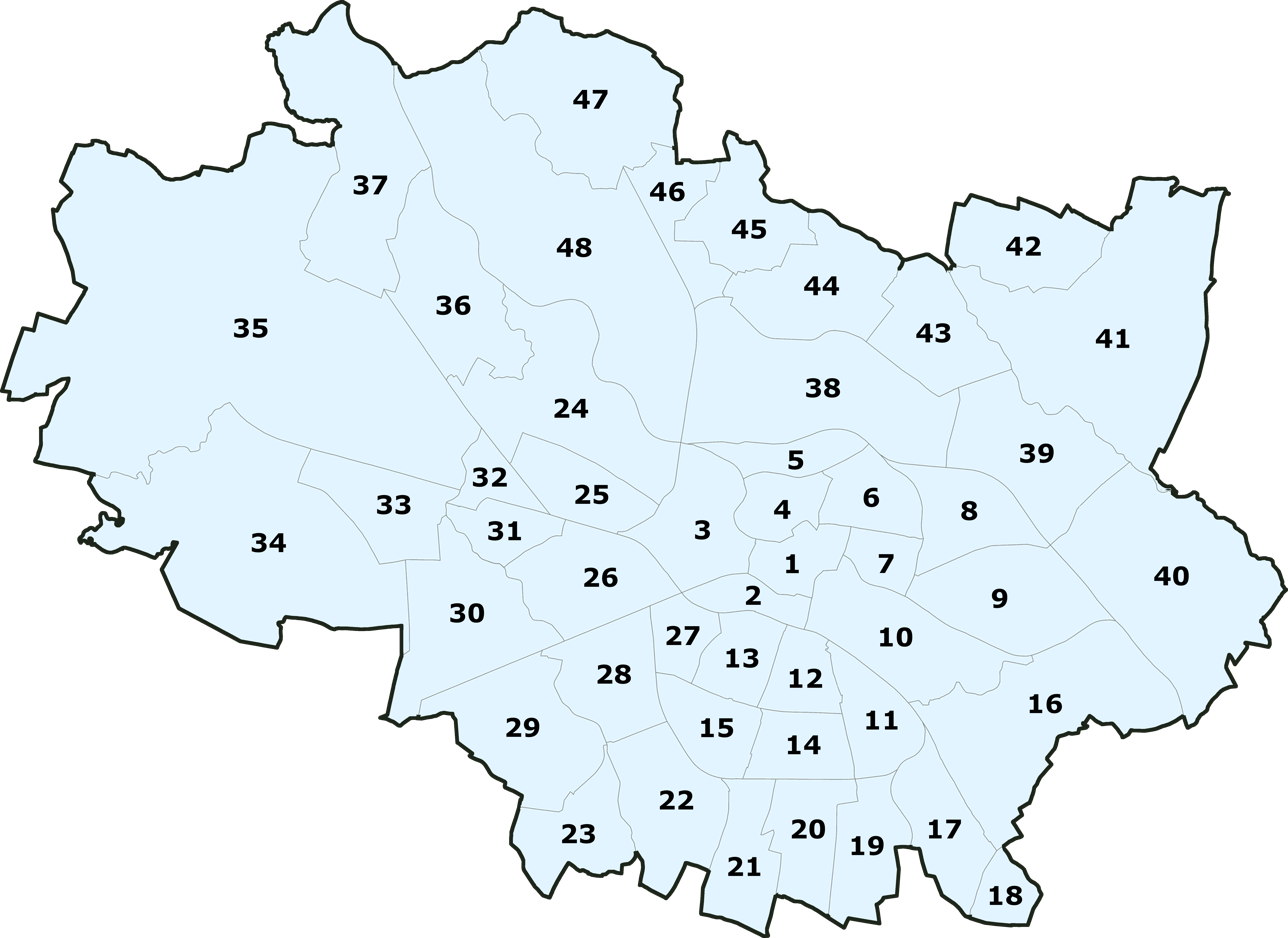
1. Old Town
2. Old Town
3. Przedmieście Świdnickie
4. Szczepin
5. Downtown
6. Nadodrze
7. Kleczków
8. Ołbin
9. Grunwald Square
10. Zacisze-Zalesie-Szczytniki
11. Biskupin-Sępolno-Dąbie-Bartoszowice
12. Krzyki
13. Przedmieście Oławskie
14. Tarnogaj
15. Huby
16. Powstańców Śląskich
17. Gaj
18. Borek
19. Księże
20. Brochów
21. Bieńkowice
22. Jagodno
23. Wojszyce
24. Ołtaszyn
25. Krzyki-Partynice
26. Klecina
24. Fabryczna
25. Pilczyce-Kozanów-Popowice Płn.
26. Gądów-Popowice Płd.
27. Muchobór Mały
28. Gajowice
29. Grabiszyn-Grabiszynek
30. Oporów
31. Muchobór Wielki
32. Nowy Dwór
33. Kuźniki
34. Żerniki
35. Jerzmanowo-Jarnołtów-Strachowice-Osiniec
36. Leśnica
37. Maślice
38. Pracze Odrzańskie
39. Psie Pole
40. Karłowice-Różanka
41. Kowale
42. Strachocin-Swojczyce-Wojnów
43. Psie Pole-Zawidawie
44. Pawłowice
45. Sołtysowice
46. Polanowice-Poświętne-Ligota
47. Widawa
48. Lipa Piotrowska
49. Świniary
50. Osobowice-Rędzin

== Historical divisions ==
=== Districts before 1945 ===
Until 1945, Wrocław (then Breslau) was divided in two levels: into Stadtteile ('city parts') corresponding to the former settlements, while these were divided into Viertel ('neighborhoods, quarters'), sometimes administratively combined with each other, derived from the original division of the medieval city into four parts.

Altstadt
- Schloßviertel
- Taschenviertel
- Neumarktviertel
- Elisabethviertel
Oder-Stadtteil
- Matthiasviertel
- Bürgerwerder
- Schießwerderviertel
- Elbing
- Kletschkau
- Polinke
Sand-Stadtteil
- Domviertel
- Hochschulviertel
- Neu-Scheitnig
- Sternviertel
- Michaelisviertel
- Scheitnig
- Leerbeutel
Ohlauer Stadteil
- Mauritiusviertel
- Ohleviertel
- Morgenau
- Parschner Viertel
Strehlener Stadteil
- Teichäckern
- Lehmgruben
- Herdain
- Huben
- Dürrgoy
Schweidnitzer Stadtteil
- Tauentzienviertel
- Siebenhufen
- Gabitz
- Neudorf
- Kleinburg
- Kaiser-Wilhelm-Viertel
Nikolai-Stadteil
- Friedrich-Wilhelm-Viertel
- Märkisches Viertel
- Tschepine
- Pöpelwitz
- Zankholz

=== Districts in 1945–1952 ===
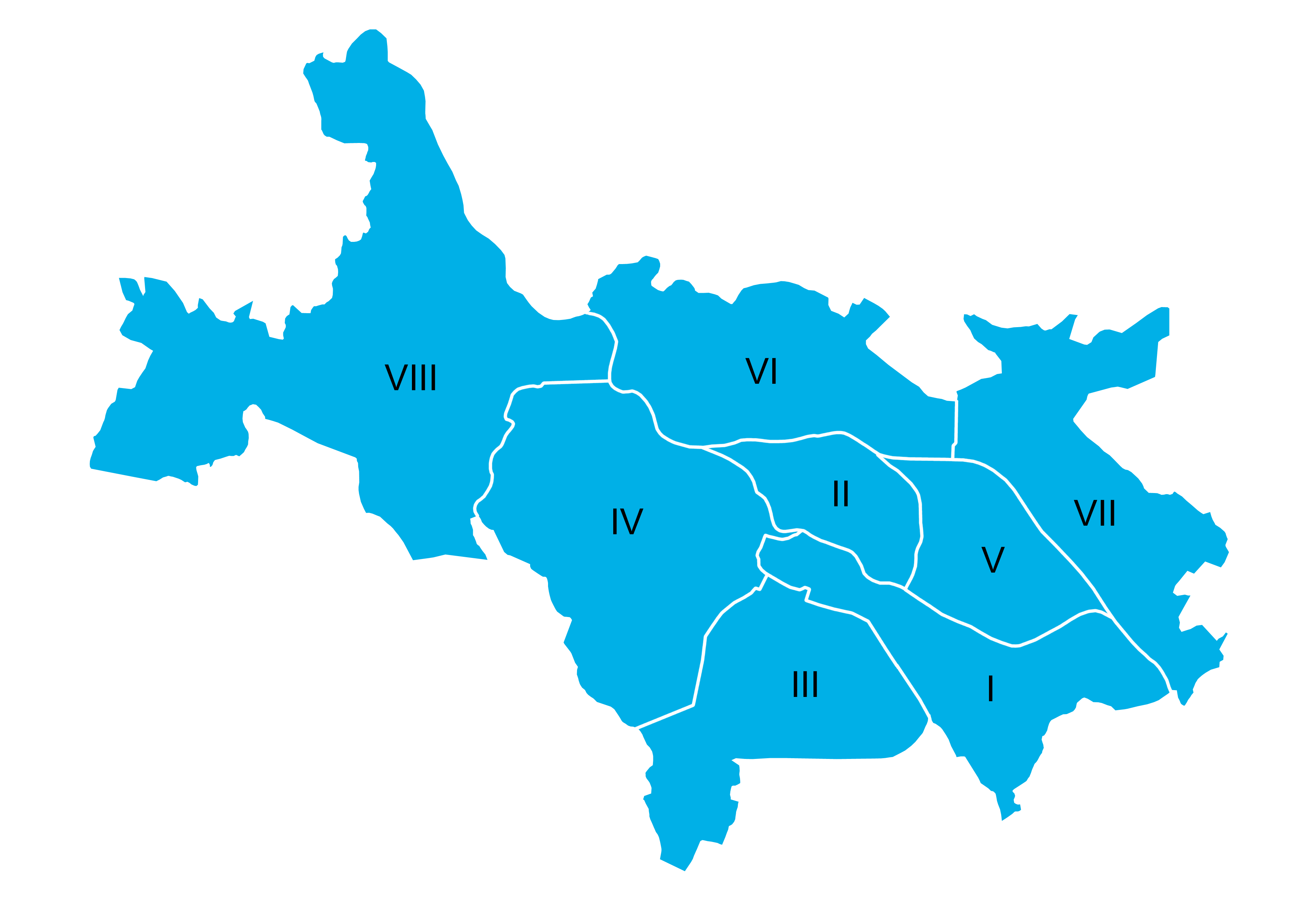
Administrative division of Wrocław in 1946–1951

The Polish administration's seizure of power in Wrocław in 1945 led to changes in the city's administrative division. The previous German division was replaced by a new division into twelve districts. By 1946, the number of districts was reduced to eight.

Each of the eight districts was overseen by the Municipal District Office, an auxiliary unit of the City Board. In 1951, the city's four districts expanded with the annexation of new neighborhoods. The division of Wrocław into eight districts ended in 1952, when they were replaced by five boroughs. The boundaries of the newly introduced districts partially overlapped with those of the former ones.

=== Districts in 1952–1991 ===
Wrocław was previously subdivided into five boroughs (Polish: dzielnice). Although they do not exist as public administration units anymore, they remained in use, mainly for statistical and administrative purposes.

The boroughs used to be divided into smaller districts, mainly based on older settlements that were incorporated into the city. The date in the brackets indicates the year the settlement was incorporated into Wrocław.

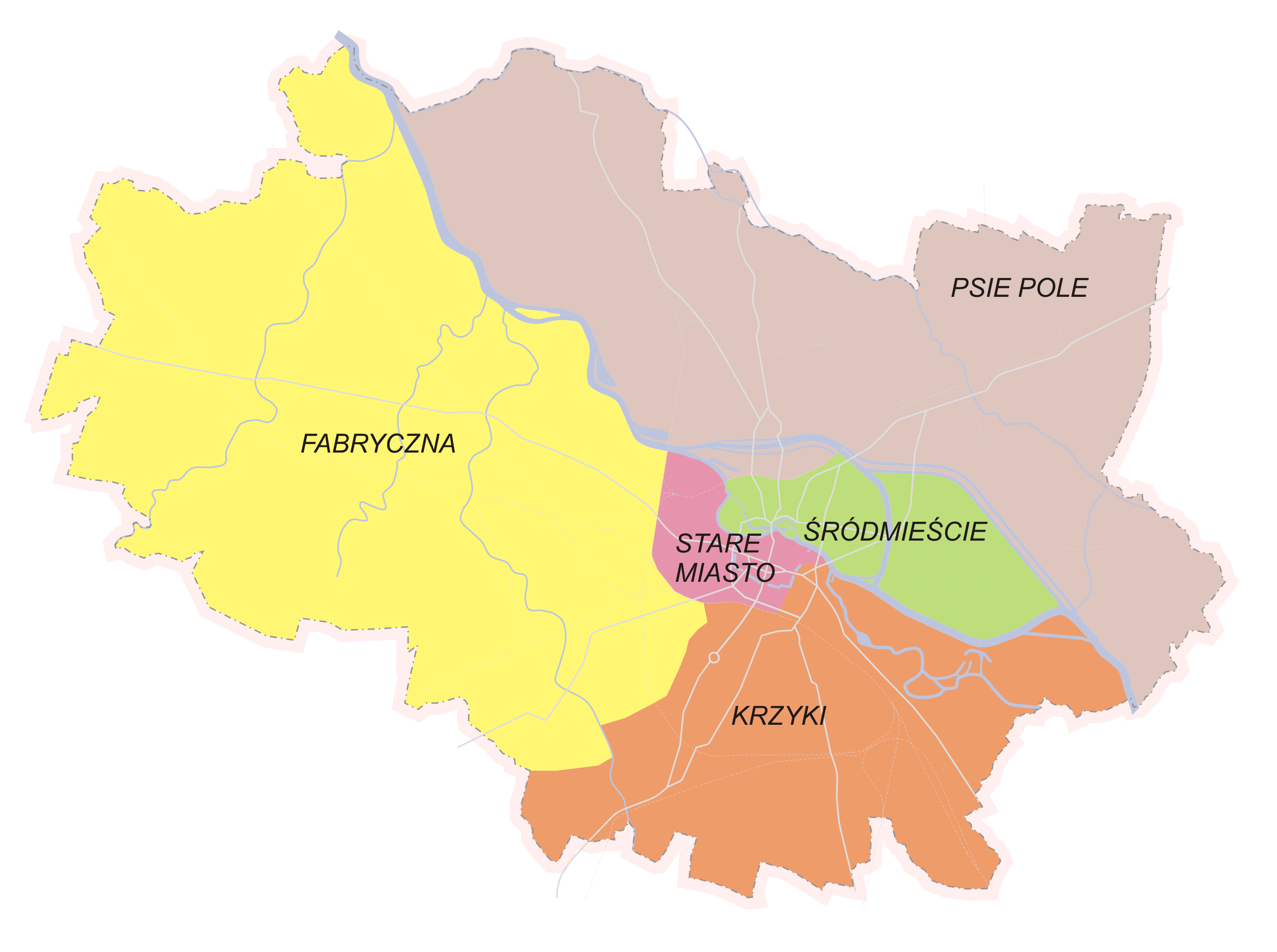

Old Town

- Stare Miasto
- Przedmieście Świdnickie (1808)
- Szczepin (1808)

Downtown

- Bartoszowice (1928)
- Biskupin (1928)
- Dąbie (1928)
- Nadodrze (1991)
- Ołbin (1808)
- Plac Grunwaldzki (1991)
- Sępolno (1924)
- Zacisze (1928)
- Zalesie (1904)
- Szczytniki (1808 Stare Szczytniki; 1868 Nowe Szczytniki)

Krzyki

- Bieńkowice (1951)
- Bierdzany (1928)
- Borek (1897)
- Brochów (1951)
- Dworek (1868)
- Gaj (1904)
- Glinianki (1868)
- Huby (1868)
- Jagodno (1951)
- Klecina (1951)
- Krzyki (1928)
- Księże Małe and Wielkie (1928)
- Lamowice Stare (1951)
- Nowy Dom (1928)
- Ołtaszyn (1951)
- Opatowice (1928)
- Partynice (1928)
- Południe (1868)
- Przedmieście Oławskie (1808)
- Rakowiec (1904)
- Siedlec (1928)
- Świątniki (1928)
- Tarnogaj (1904)
- Wilczy Kąt (1808)
- Wojszyce (1951)

Psie Pole

- Karłowice (1928)
- Kleczków (1808)
- Kłokoczyce (1973)
- Kowale (1928)
- Lesica (1973)
- Ligota (1928)
- Lipa Piotrowska (1973)
- Miłostków/Marzanów (1951)
- Mirowiec (1928)
- Osobowice (1928)
- Pawłowice (1970)
- Polanka (1808)
- Polanowice (1973)
- Poświętne (1928)
- Pracze Widawskie (1973)
- Psie Pole (1928)
- Rędzin (1973)
- Różanka (1928)
- Sołtysowice (1951)
- Strachocin (1928)
- Swojczyce (1928)
- Świniary (1973)
- Widawa (1973)
- Wojnów (1951)
- Zakrzów (1951)
- Zgorzelisko (1951)

Fabryczna

- Gajowice (1868)
- Gądów Mały (1928)
- Grabiszyn (1911)
- Grabiszynek (1911)
- Janówek (1973)
- Jarnołtów (1973)
- Jerzmanowo (1973)
- Kozanów (1928)
- Kuźniki (1928)
- Leśnica (1928)
- Marszowice (1973)
- Maślice (1928)
- Mokra (1973)
- Muchobór Mały (1928)
- Muchobór Wielki (1951)
- Nowa Karczma (1928)
- Nowe Domy (1928)
- Nowy Dwór (1928)
- Osiniec (1973)
- Oporów (1951)
- Pilczyce (1928)
- Popowice (1897)
- Pracze Odrzańskie (1928)
- Pustki (1928)
- Ratyn (1928)
- Stabłowice (1928)
- Stabłowice Nowe (1928)
- Strachowice (1973)
- Złotniki (1928)
- Żar (1973)
- Żerniki (1928)

== See also ==
- Old Town, Wrocław
