= Przedmieście Świdnickie =

District in Wrocław, Poland

- District of Wrocław
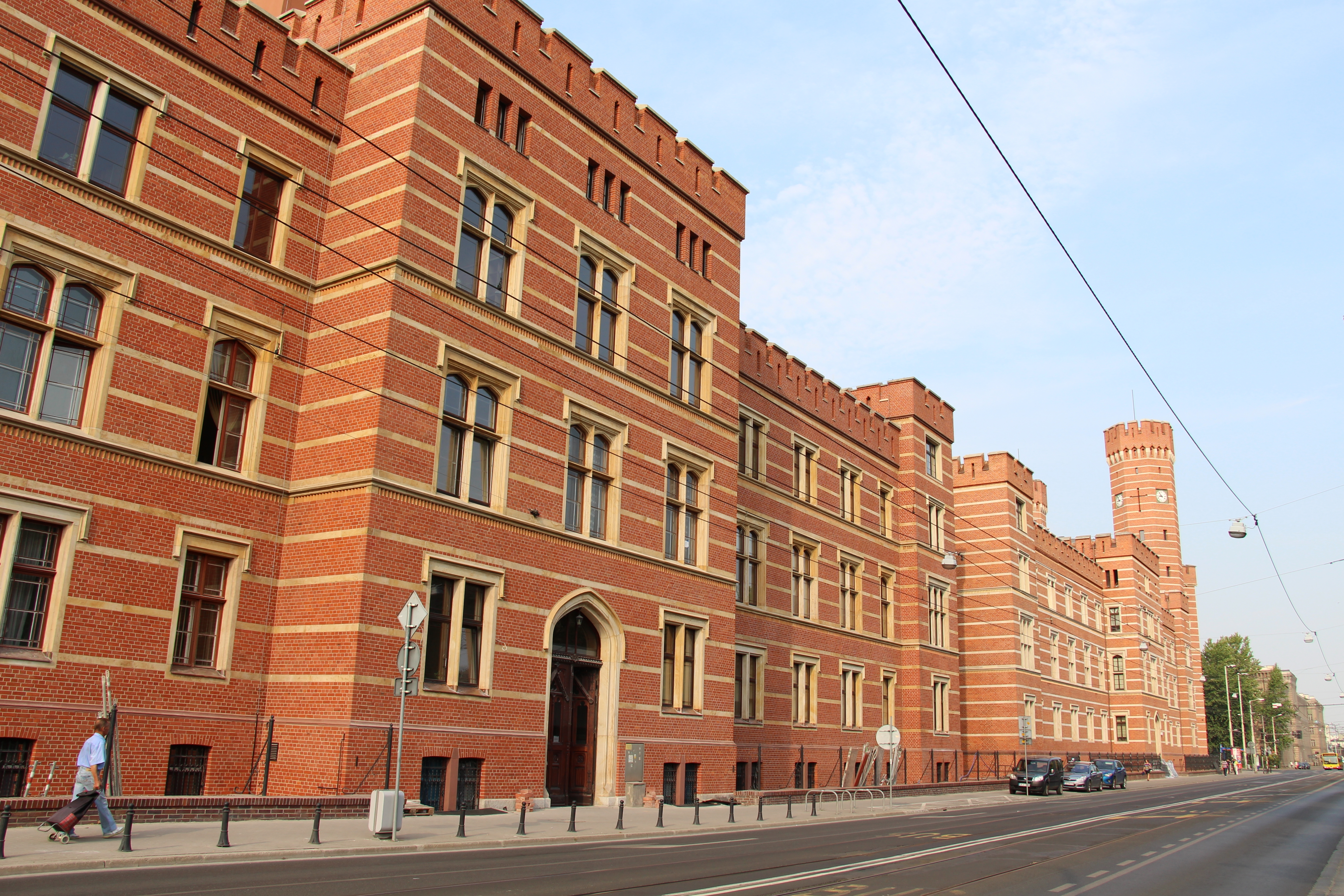
- Courthouse

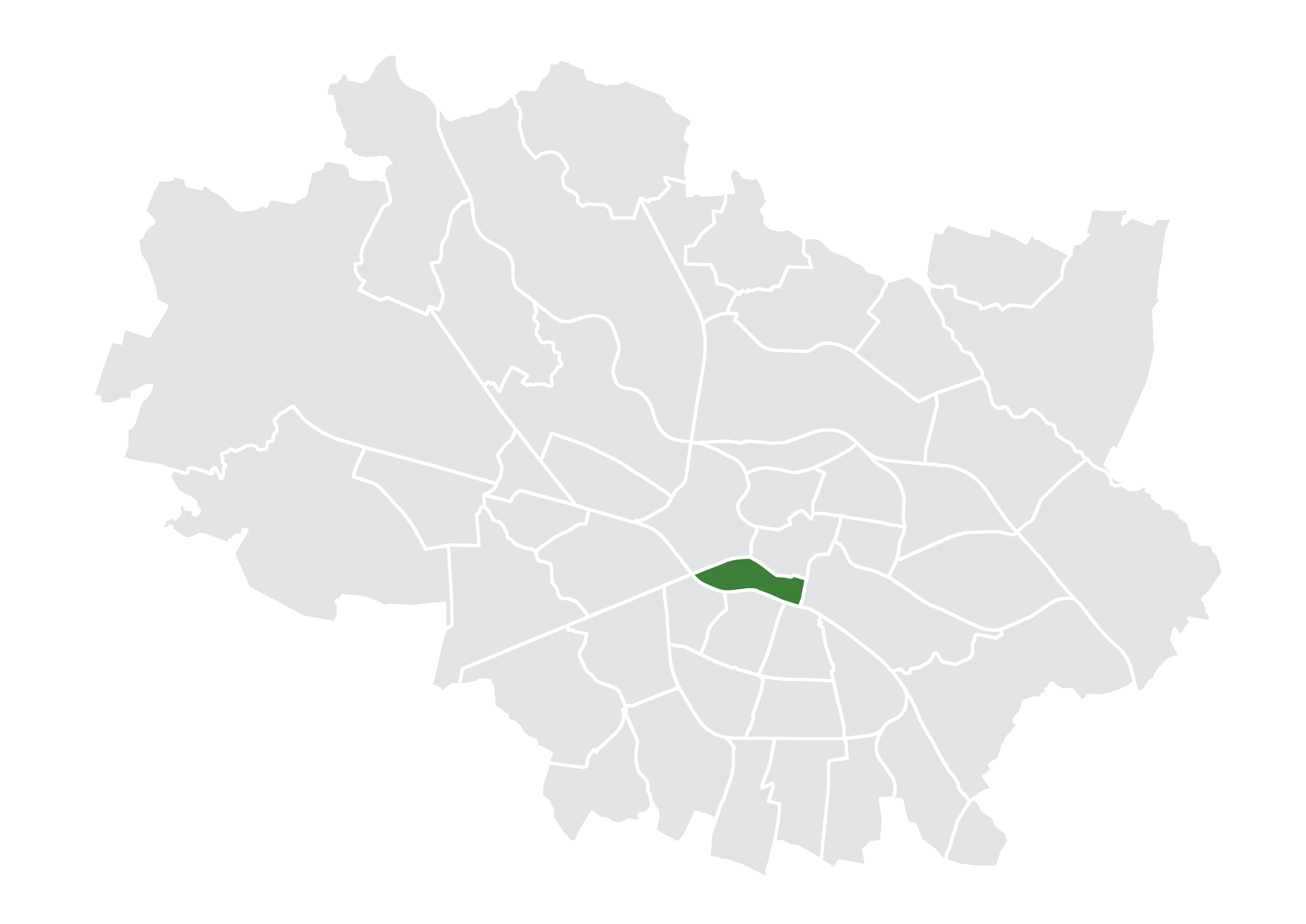
- Location of Przedmieście Świdnickie within Wrocław
- Country: Poland
- Voivodeship: Lower Silesian
- County/City: Wrocław
- Established the modern-day district: 1991

Population (2022)
  - Total: 13,870
- Time zone: UTC+1 (CET)
  - Summer (DST): UTC+2 (CEST)
- Area code: +48 71
- Website: Osiedle Przedmieście Świdnickie

Przedmieście Świdnickie (Polish: [pʂɛdˈmjɛɕt͡ɕɛ ɕfidˈɲit͡skʲɛ]; German: Schweidnitzer Vorstadt [ˈʃvaɪtnɪtsɐ ˈfoːɐ̯ʃtat]; lit. 'Świdnica Suburb') is a district in Wrocław, Poland, located in the central part of the city. It was established in the territory of the former Old Town district.

The district owes its name to its location; it is situated in front of the former Świdnica Gate, which was within the city walls on the route from Wrocław's Market Square to Świdnica.

In 1991, after reforms in the administrative division of Wrocław, Przedmieście Świdnickie became one of the city's 48 districts.
