= Księże =

District in Wrocław, Poland

- District of Wrocław
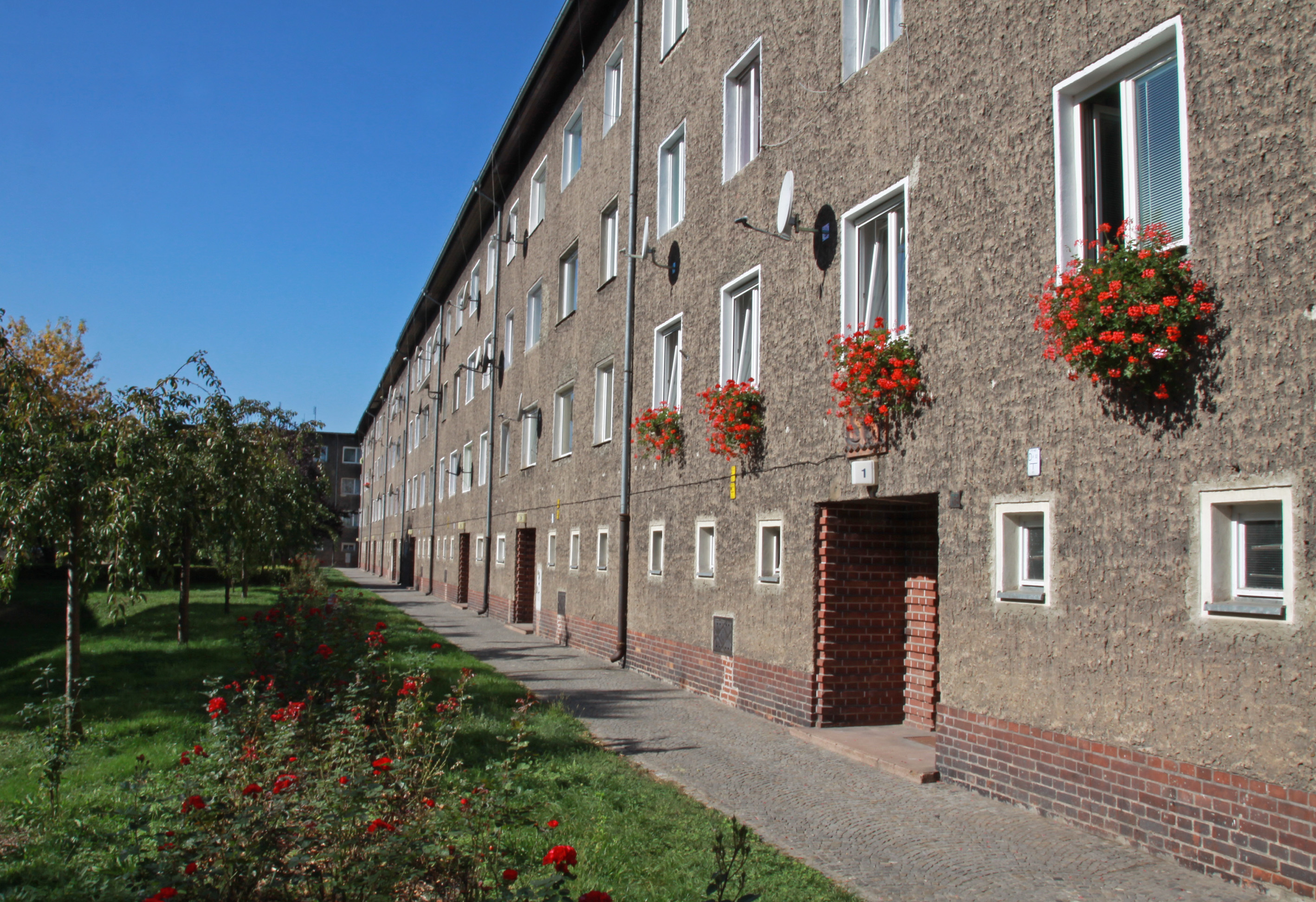

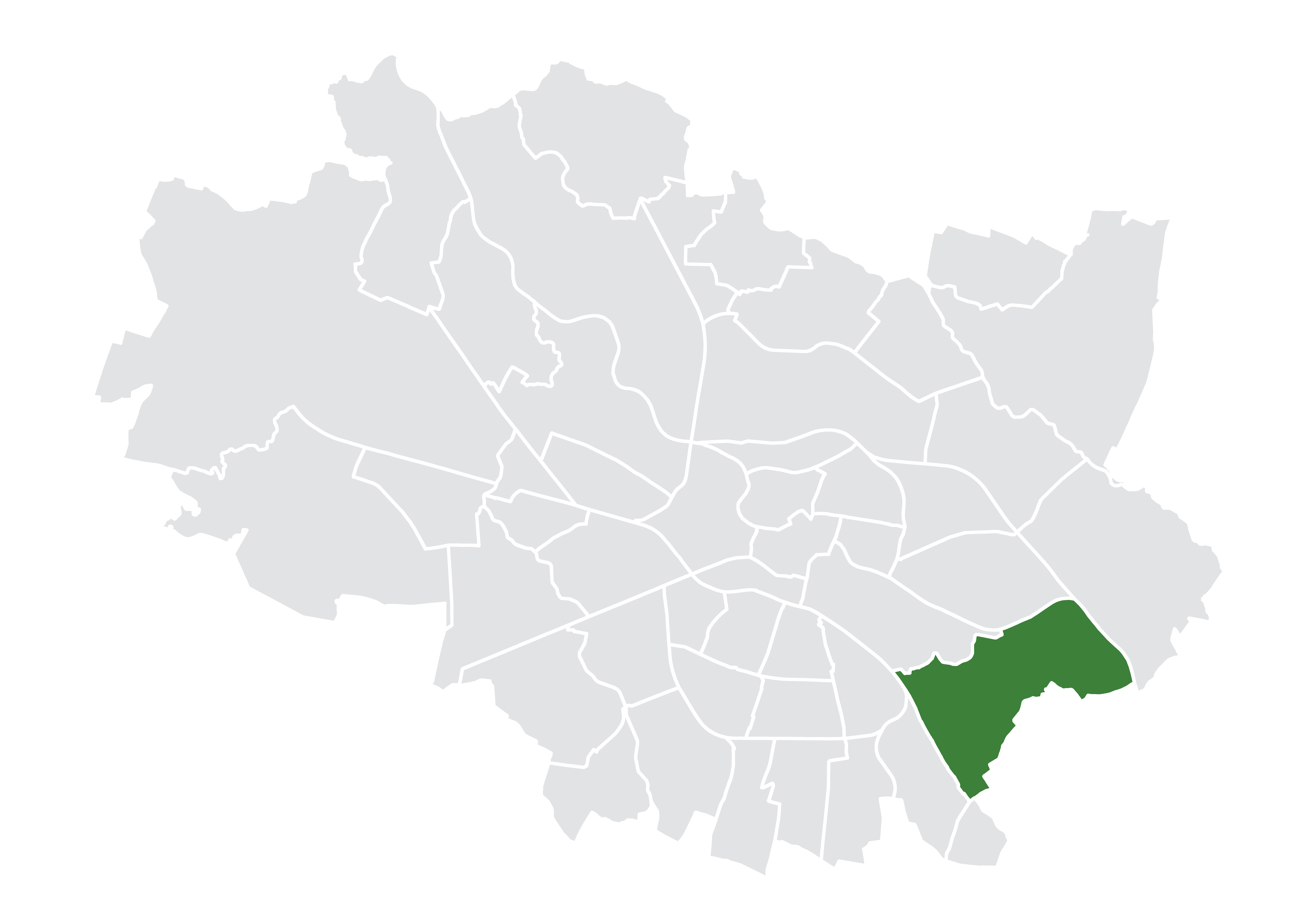
- Location of Księże within Wrocław
- Country: Poland
- Voivodeship: Lower Silesian
- County/City: Wrocław
- Established: 1991

Population (2022)
  - Total: 6,379
- Time zone: UTC+1 (CET)
  - Summer (DST): UTC+2 (CEST)
- Area code: +48 71
- Website: radaksieze.pl

Księże (Polish pronunciation: [ˈkɕɛw̃ʐɛ], German: Tschansch, [t͡ʃanʃ]) is a district in Wrocław, Poland, located in the southeastern part of the city. It was established in the territory of the former Krzyki borough.

The district includes the area of the former villages of Księże Małe, Księże Wielkie, Świątniki, Opatowice, Bierdzany and the settlement of Nowy Dom incorporated within city limits on April 1, 1928.

== Name ==
The settlement of Księże Wielkie was first recorded in the mid-12th century under the Latin names of Chenese, Kenese, Sansin, and Czanschin majus. The names Czanschin minus and paruum Czanschyn were used to refer to Księże Małe in the 14th century.

The names of the settlements come from the same root as the modern-day Polish word 'książę' ('prince'), resulting from the fact that the settlements belonged to the prince. Therefore, the original Polish name was Knięże, which later became Księżno and eventually Księże. The phonetically Germanised names of the settlements were Klein Tschansch and Groß Tschansch, which were later changed to Klein and Groß Ohlewiesen ('Oława meadows') during the Nazi era, in order to remove traces of their Polish origin.

For two years after the war, due to misconstruction of medieval records, the settlements of Tschansch were renamed to Mały Ciążyn and Wielki Ciążyn. The name was later reverted to Księże. The previous name Ciążyn remains to be used as a proper name of the wastewater treatment plant in the district.

== History ==
Works on the modernist housing estate in Tschansch began in 1924 with the creation of a master plan for Breslau at the City Development Office under the direction of Fritz Behrendt in cooperation with Heinrich Knipping. The final urban planning assumptions for Klein and Groß Tschansch were made in January 1925, followed by the final design of the settlement in Klein Tschansch on April 26, 1928.

Księże Małe estate is the only pre-war housing estate in Wrocław that was envisioned and executed entirely in line with modernist principles (WuWA and other estates were built as parts of districts, where Księże Małe estate was designed for the then unsettled Księże Małe neighbourhood). The estate consists of low-rise buildings with distressed concrete façades. As the estate was planned primarily for working class residents, who at the time were less literate than other social classes, each building featured a different relief above the entrance to help people differentiate buildings between each other, as they were mostly uniform in design. The estate features open green spaces, public playgrounds and services, and due to cost constraints, the dwellings originally did not feature bathrooms and drying rooms - instead each building had a shared bathroom and drying room space.

Księże historically has been, and still retains a reputation of a poorer, less affluent district than others. This is likely due to its working class and industrial history and subsequent loss of investment and urban decay. The district features on the list of "degraded areas of revitalisation", alongside many other southeast Wrocław districts.

Revitalisation efforts are in place, the district's main street (Opolska Street), subsequently an artery for southeast Wrocław is due to undergo a big revitalisation investment.

In 1991, after reforms in the administrative division of Wrocław, Księże became one of the city's 48 districts.

The district was heavily affected by the 1997 Central European flood.
