= Wojszyce =

District in Wrocław, Poland

- District of Wrocław
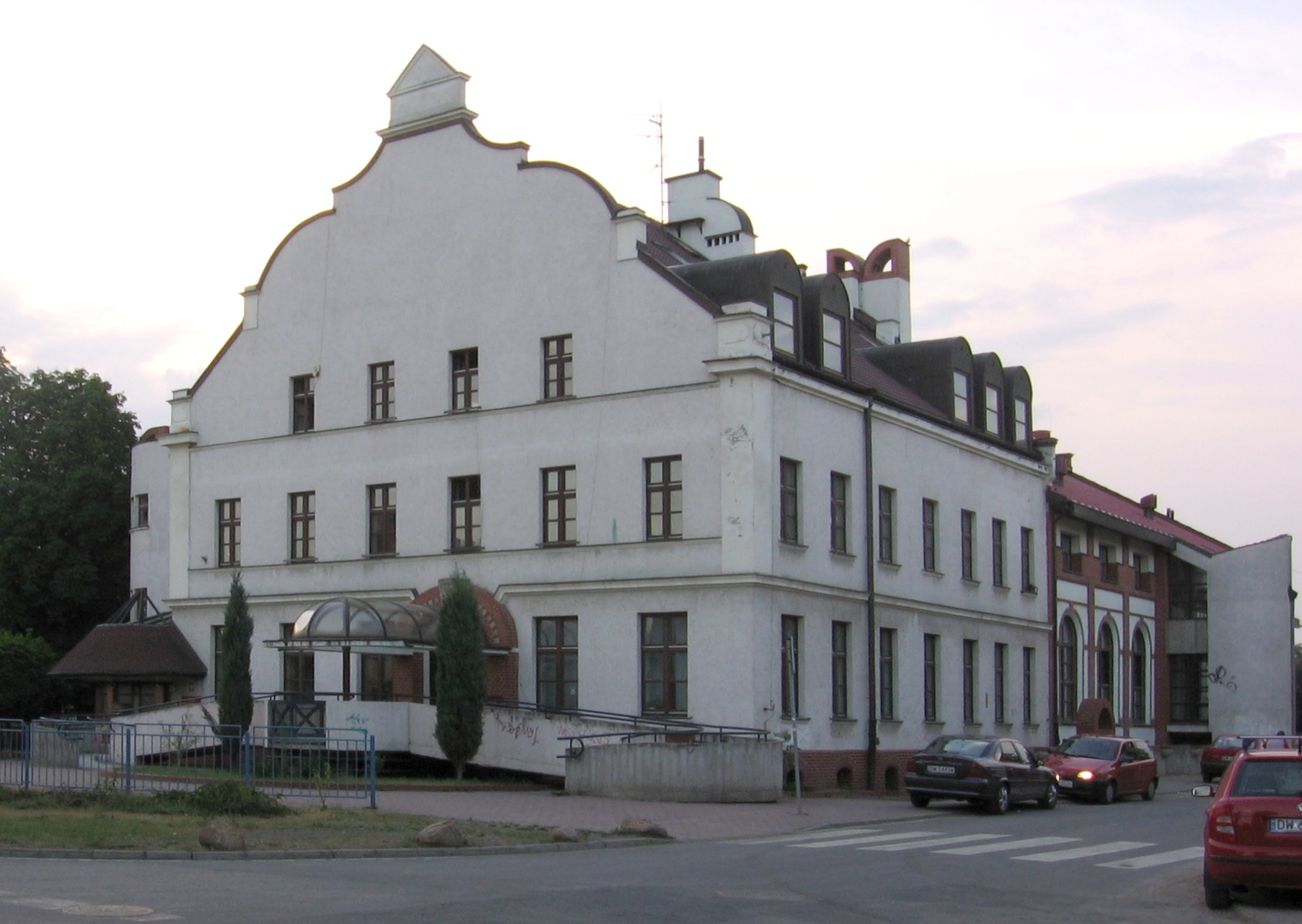

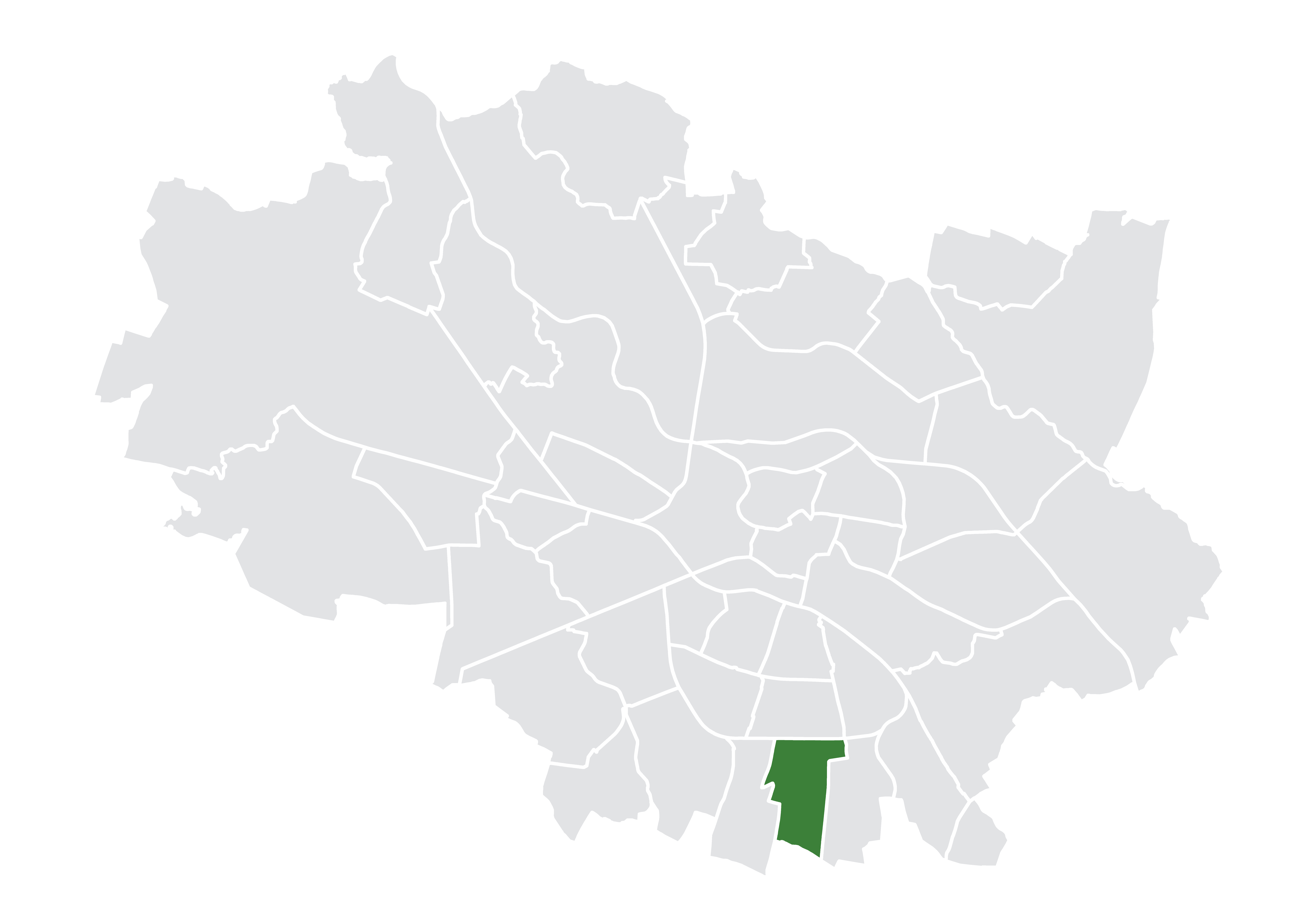
- Location of Wojszyce within Wrocław
- Country: Poland
- Voivodeship: Lower Silesian
- County/City: Wrocław
- First mentioned: 1249
- Incorporated into the city: 1951
- Established the modern-day district: 1991

Population (2022)
  - Total: 7,285
- Time zone: UTC+1 (CET)
  - Summer (DST): UTC+2 (CEST)
- Area code: +48 71
- Website: Osiedle Wojczyce

Wojszyce (Polish pronunciation: [vɔjˈʂɨt͡sɛ], German: Woischwitz, [ˈvɔɪ̯ʃvɪt͡s]) is a district in Wrocław, Poland, located in the southern part of the city. It was established in the territory of the former Krzyki district.

Initially a village, the settlement was incorporated into Wrocław in 1951.

== History ==
The settlement was first recorded in 1249. The name was later on Germanized to Woischwitz. In 1936, during the Nazi era, its name was changed to Hoinstein in order to remove traces of its Polish origin. Following the war, the settlement was renamed Uścimów, and later Wojszyce.

In 1991, after reforms in the administrative division of Wrocław, Wojszyce became one of the city's 48 districts.
