= Psie Pole-Zawidawie =

District in Wrocław, Poland

- District of Wrocław
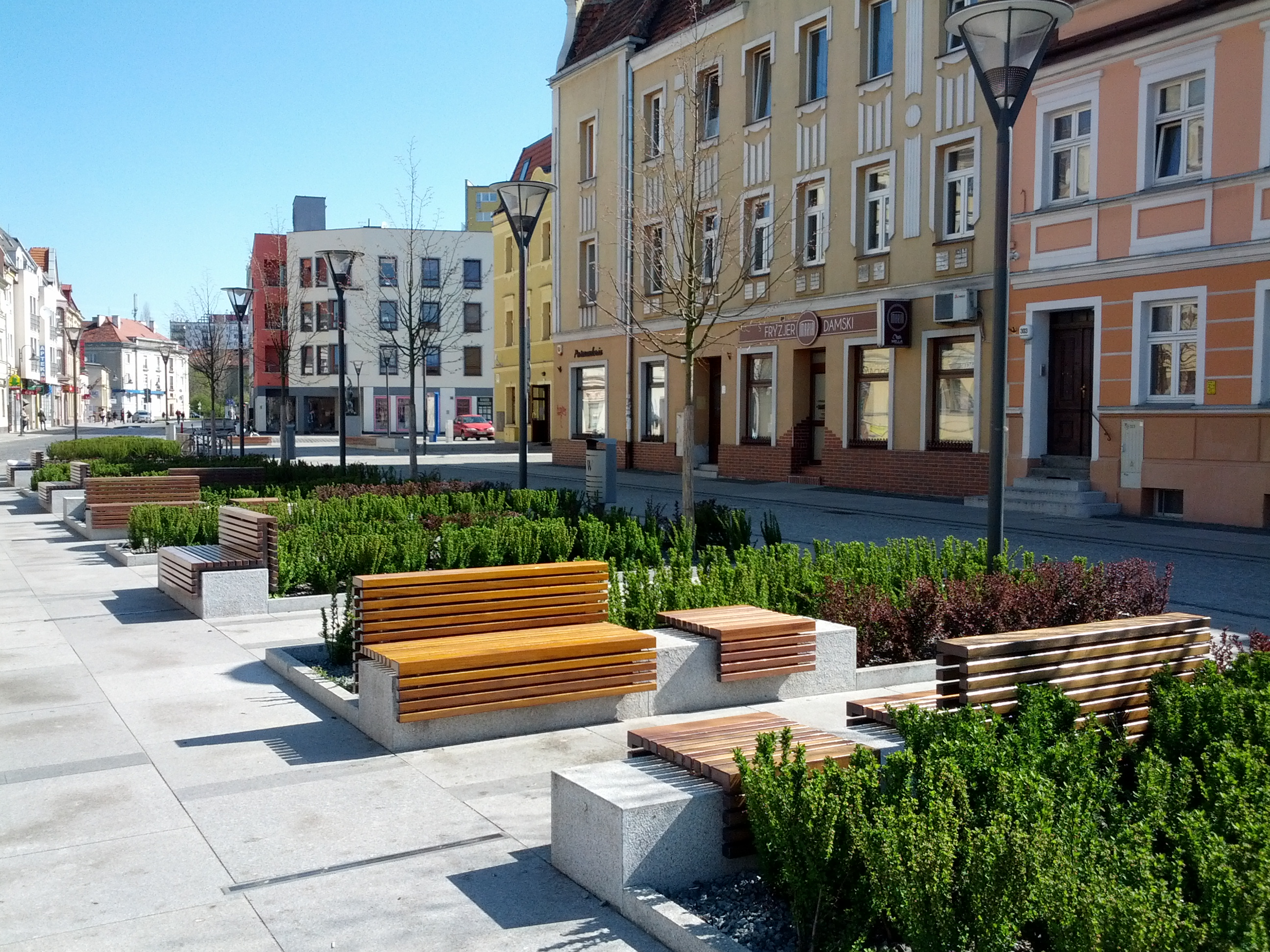

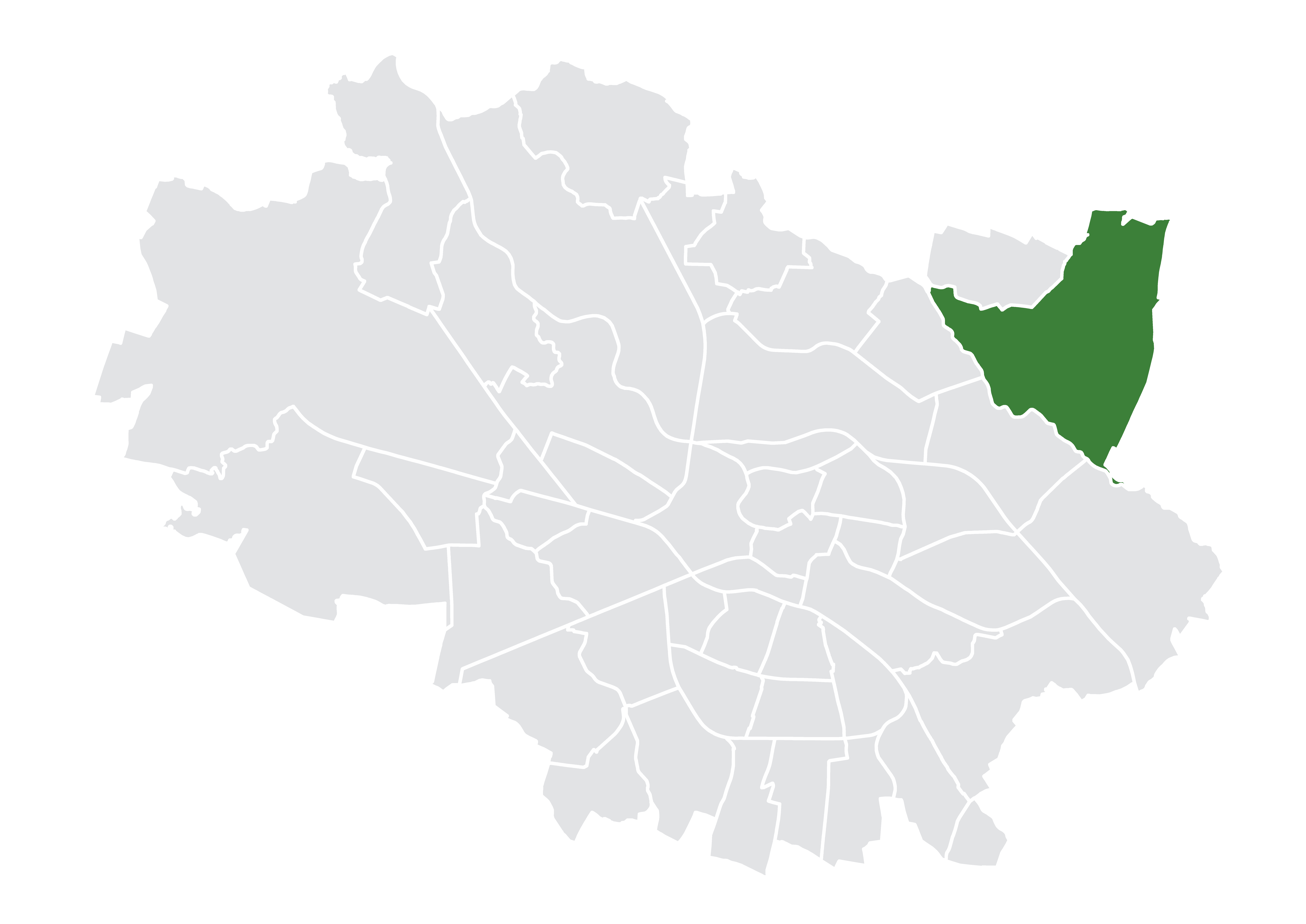
- Location of the district within Wrocław
- Country: Poland
- Voivodeship: Lower Silesian
- County/City: Wrocław
- Established: 1991

Population (2022)
  - Total: 29,606
- Time zone: UTC+1 (CET)
  - Summer (DST): UTC+2 (CEST)
- Area code: +48 71
- Website: Osiedle Zawidawie

Psie Pole-Zawidawie (Polish pronunciation: [pɕɛ ˈpɔle zaviˈdavjɛ], literally "Dogs' Field-Zawidawie") are self-goverening osiedles (a type of neighborhood) in Wrocław, Poland, located in the north-eastern part of the city. It was established in the territory of the former Psie Pole city district. It consists of the neighborhoods of Psie Pole, Zakrzów, Zgorzelisko, and Kłokoczyce.

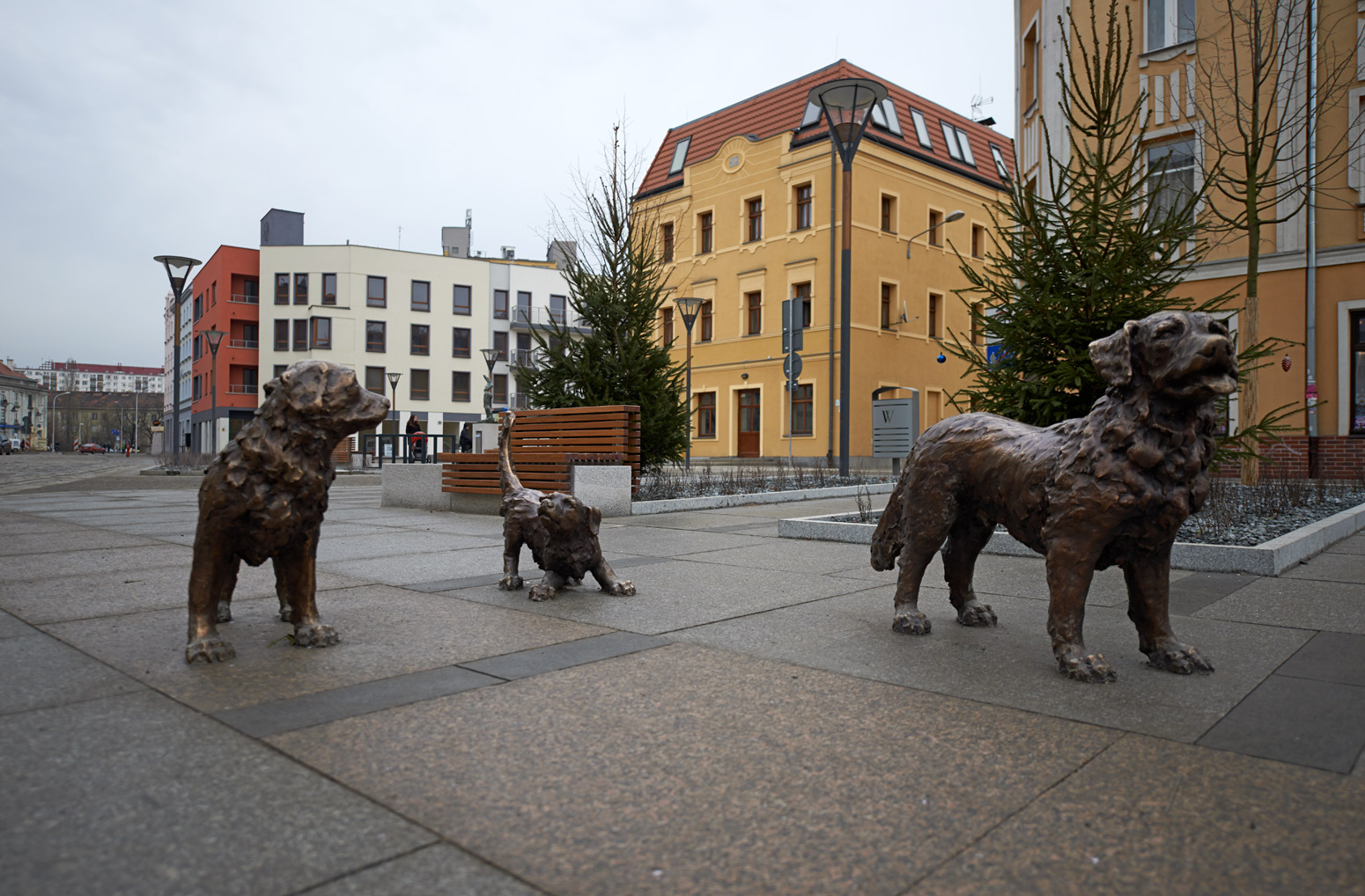
Dog statues in "Dogs' Field"

The Psie Pole neighborhood is in the place of the former independent city Psie Pole known as the place of the Battle of Psie Pole of 1109, in which the Poles defeated invading Germans.

In 1991, after reforms in the administrative division of Wrocław, Psie Pole-Zawidawie became one of the city's 48 districts.
