= Gajowice =

District in Wrocław, Poland

- District of Wrocław
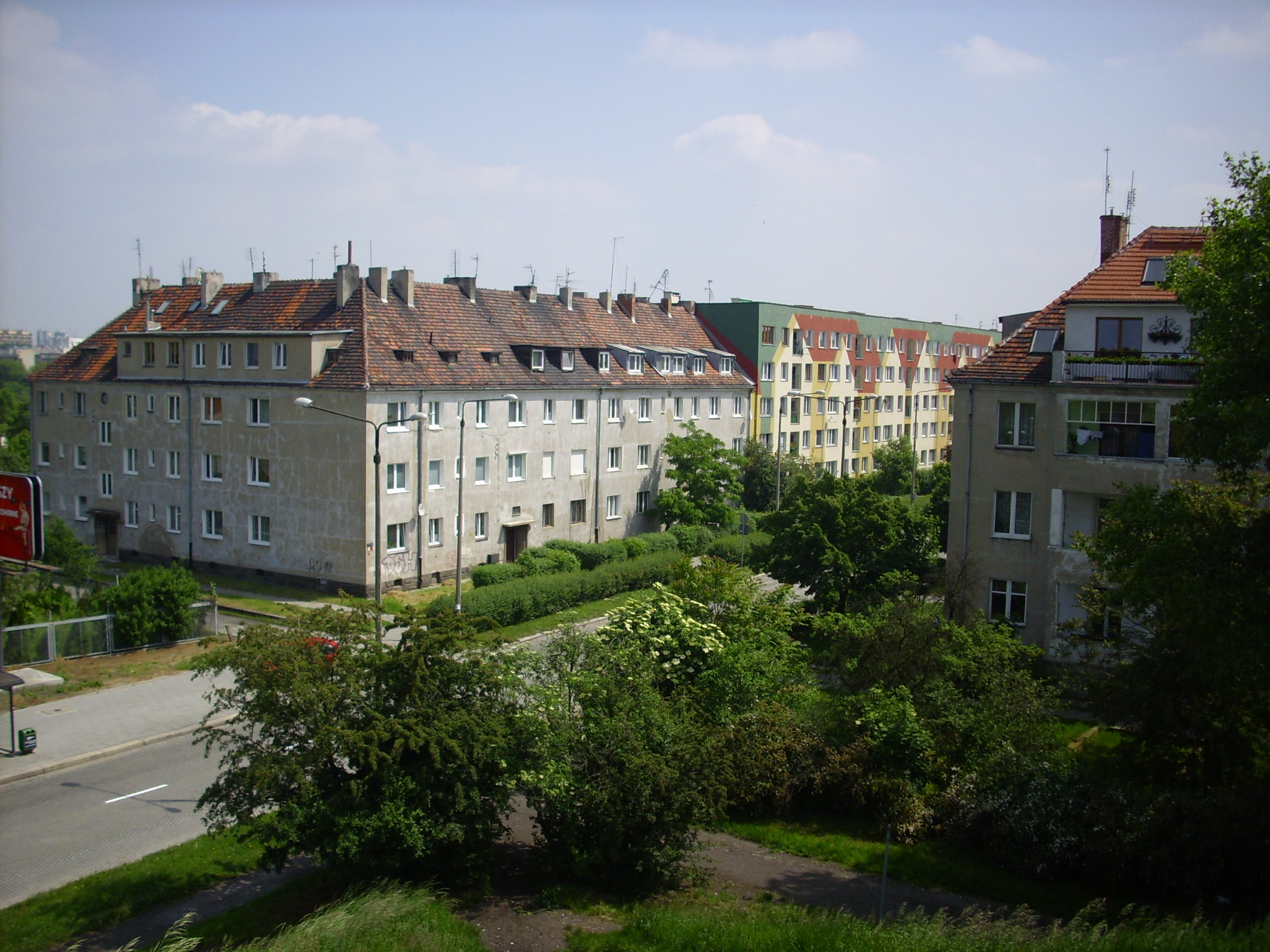

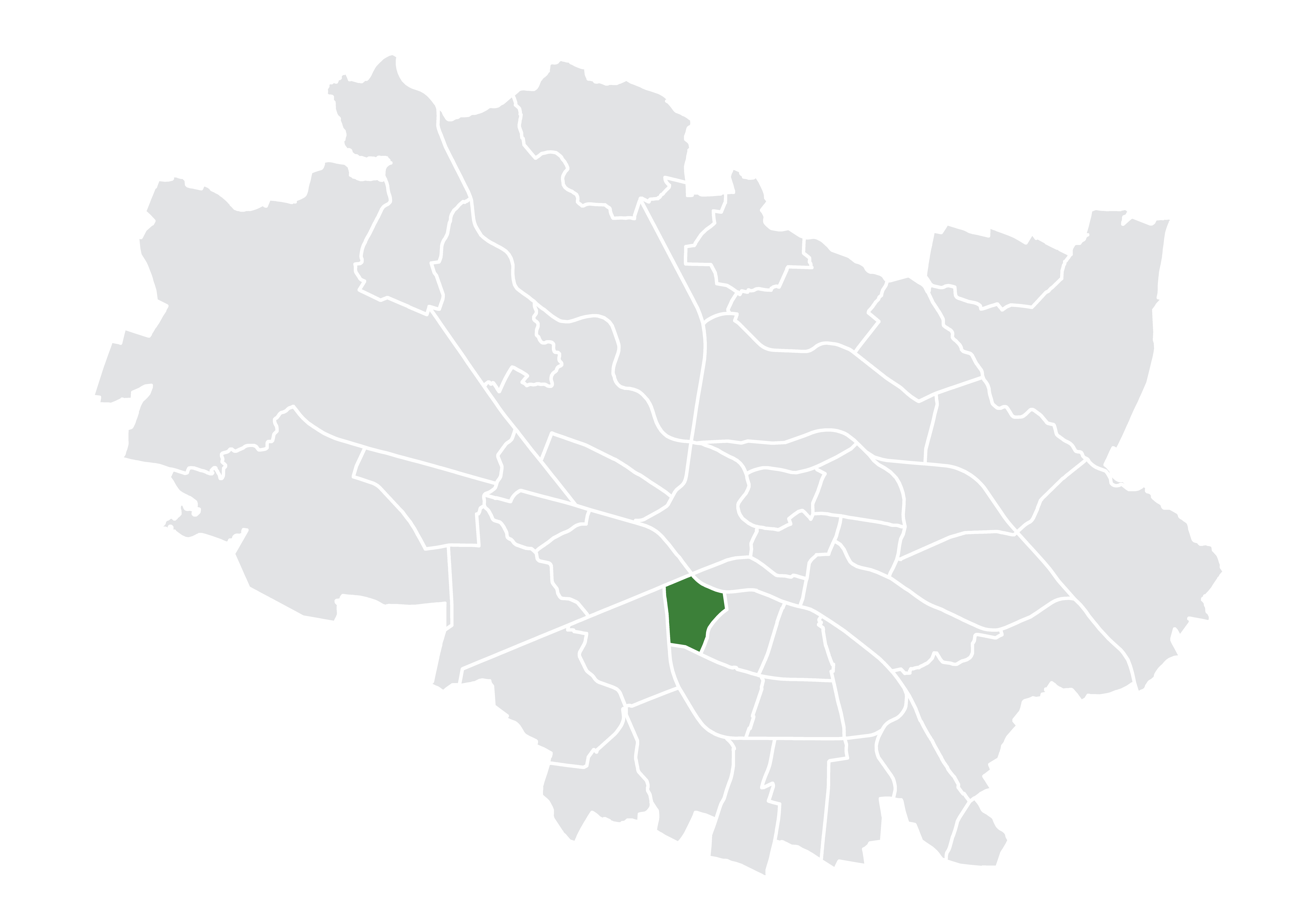
- Location of Gajowice within Wrocław
- Country: Poland
- Voivodeship: Lower Silesian
- County/City: Wrocław
- First mentioned: 1193
- Incorporated into the city: 1868
- Established the modern-day district: 1991

Population (2022)
  - Total: 21,781
- Time zone: UTC+1 (CET)
  - Summer (DST): UTC+2 (CEST)
- Area code: +48 71
- Website: Osiedle Gajowice

Gajowice (Polish pronunciation: [gajɔˈvit͡sɛ], German: Gabitz, [ˈgabɪt͡s]) is a district in Wrocław located in the south-western part of the city. It was established in the territory of the former Fabryczna district.

== History ==
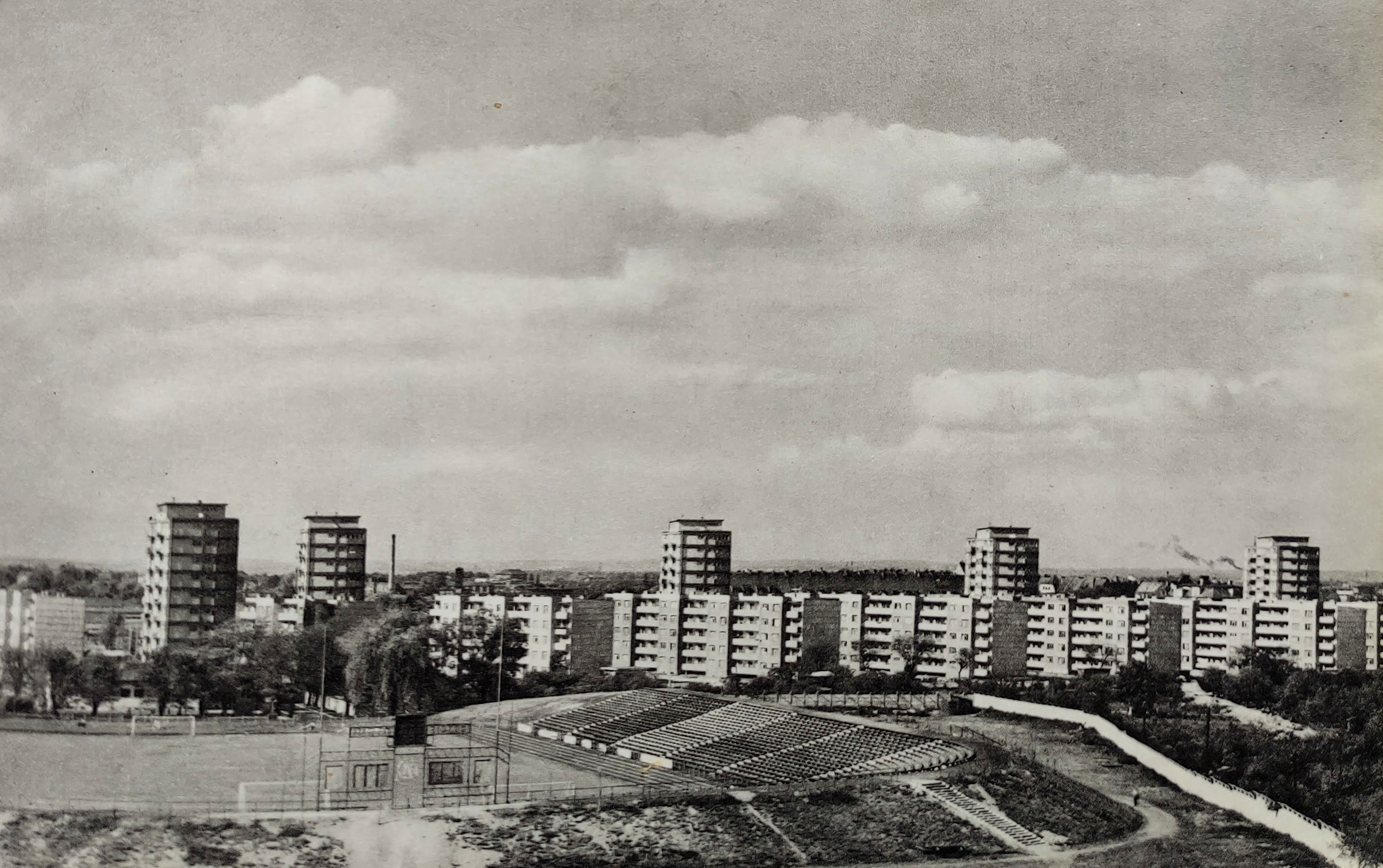
Gajowice in the 1960s

The settlement was first mentioned in 1193, when it was part of medieval Piast-ruled Poland. Throughout its history, the settlement was known by many names – namely Gay, Gayouice, Goiez, Gawicz, Gaiowicz, Gaywicz, Gabitz, and Gajowice. Since medieval times, it was mainly famous for growing vegetables and fruits. This was favored by its proximity to the city.

Initially a village, the settlement was incorporated into Breslau (today's Wrocław) in 1868.

Gajowice was one of the Wrocław neighborhoods most affected by World War II. Originally, after the war, Gajowice was set to be "an emergency settlement for the residents of Wrocław evicted from buildings slated for demolition." Subsequent planning changes led to the design of a housing development meant for up to 30,000 residents. At that time, this project was the largest housing development in the city's postwar history.

In 1991, after reforms in the administrative division of Wrocław, Gajowice became one of the city's 48 districts.
