= Old Town, Wrocław (borough) =

Former borough in Wrocław, Poland

Coordinates: 51°06′39″N 17°02′02″E

Old Town Stare Miasto
- Former borough of Wrocław
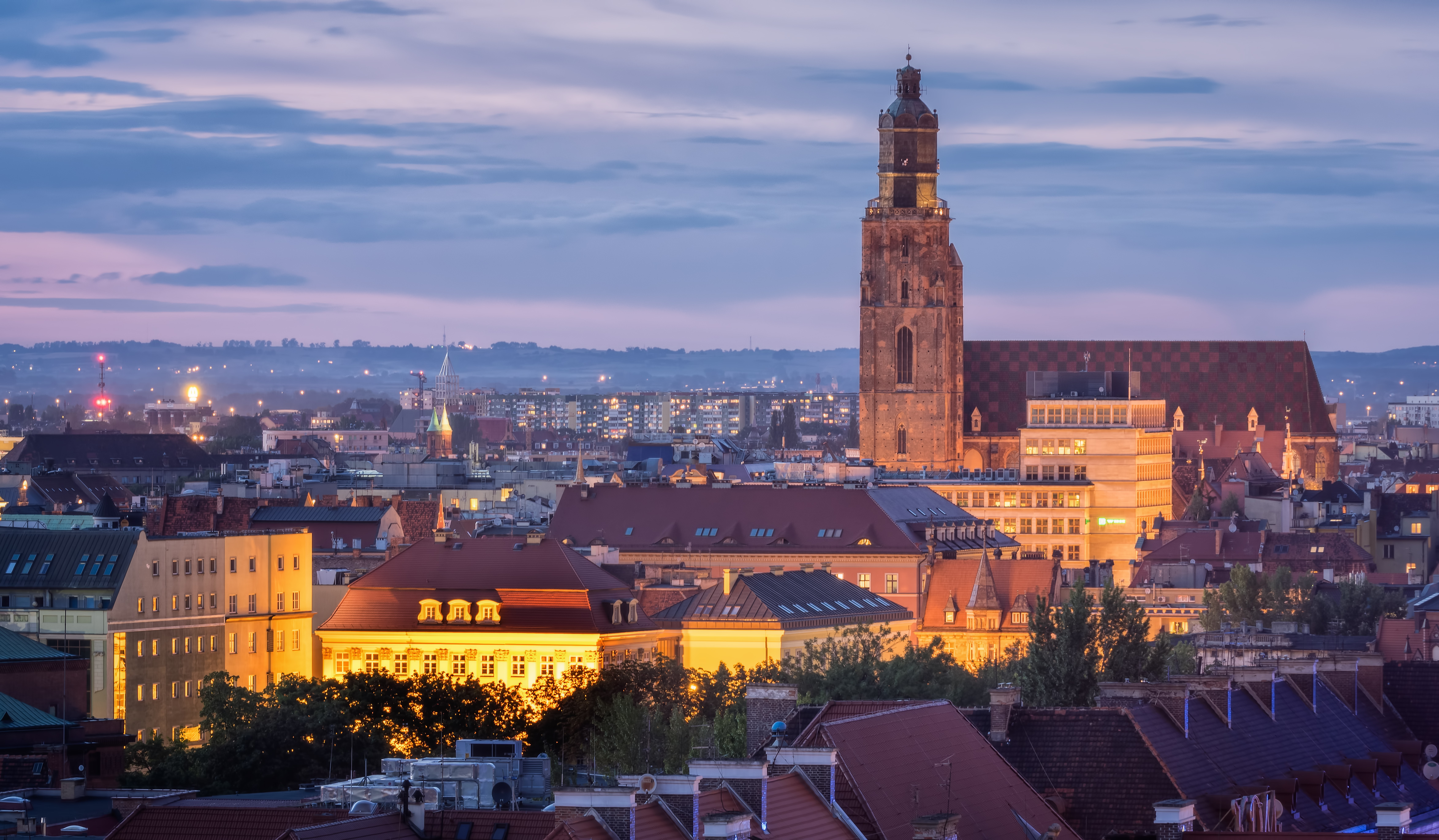

- Location of Old Town within Wrocław
- Country: Poland
- Voivodeship: Lower Silesian
- County/City: Wrocław
- Established: 1952
- Dissolved: 1990

Population (2022)
  - Total: 41,241
- Time zone: UTC+1 (CET)
  - Summer (DST): UTC+2 (CEST)
- Area code: +48 71

Old Town (Polish: Stare Miasto, [ˈstarɛ ˈmjastɔ]) is a former borough of Wrocław located in the central part of the city.

On March 21, 1991, the newly created City Office of Wrocław assumed many of the functions previously carried out within the borough. The name, though, remained in use, mainly for statistical and administrative purposes.

The borough is bordered by the right bank of the Oder River, the former course of the Oława River, the eastern section of the City Moat, Dworcowa Street and the railway line from the Central Station towards Poznań.

== Subdivision ==
Since 1991, Old Town has been divided into 3 districts:

- Old Town
- Przedmieście Świdnickie
- Szczepin
