= Oporów =

District in Wrocław, Poland

- District of Wrocław
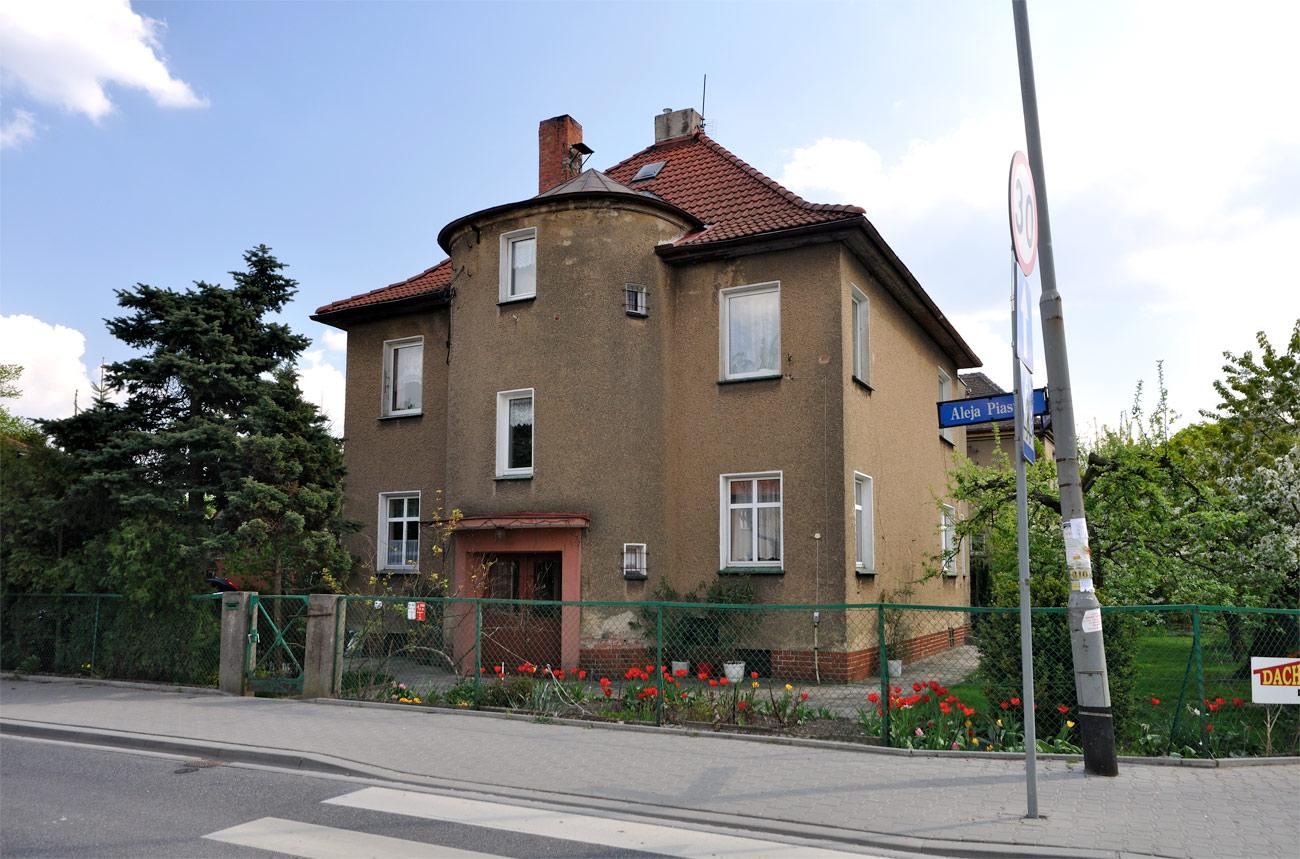

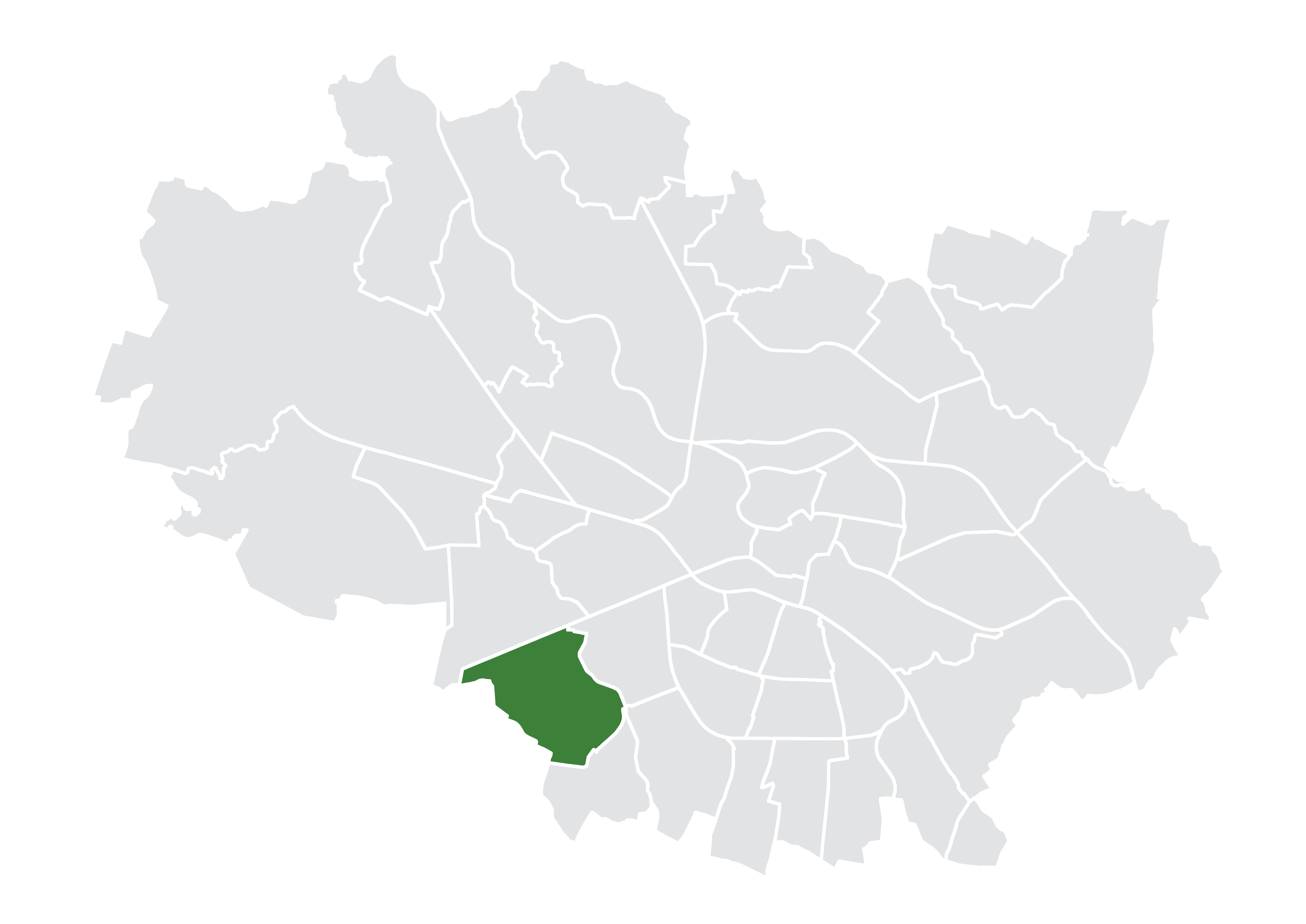
- Location of Oporów within Wrocław
- Country: Poland
- Voivodeship: Lower Silesian
- County/City: Wrocław
- Established the village: 1211
- Incorporated into the city: 1951
- Established the modern-day district: 1991

Population (2022)
  - Total: 7,641
- Time zone: UTC+1 (CET)
  - Summer (DST): UTC+2 (CEST)
- Area code: +48 71
- Website: oporow.info.pl

Oporów (Polish pronunciation: [ɔˈpɔruf], German: Opperau, [ˈɔpɛʁaʊ]) is a district in Wrocław located in the south-western part of the city. It was established in the territory of the former Fabryczna district.

Initially a village, the settlement was incorporated into Wrocław in 1951.

== History ==
Oporów was established as a village in 1211 within medieval Poland. At the start of the 20th century, Opperau was transformed into a villa estate. Its peak was in the 1930s when wealthy Breslau (Wrocław) residents constructed villas for themselves. During the war, a school and a Catholic church were established.

After the war, professors from Wrocław universities settled in Oporów, giving it a unique and elite atmosphere.

Oporów was incorporated into Wrocław in 1951, and in 1991, after reforms in the administrative division of Wrocław, it became one of the city's 48 districts.
