= Old Town, Wrocław (neighbourhood) =

District in Wrocław, Poland

Coordinates: 51°06′39″N 17°02′10″E

Old Town Stare Miasto
- Neighbourhood of Wrocław
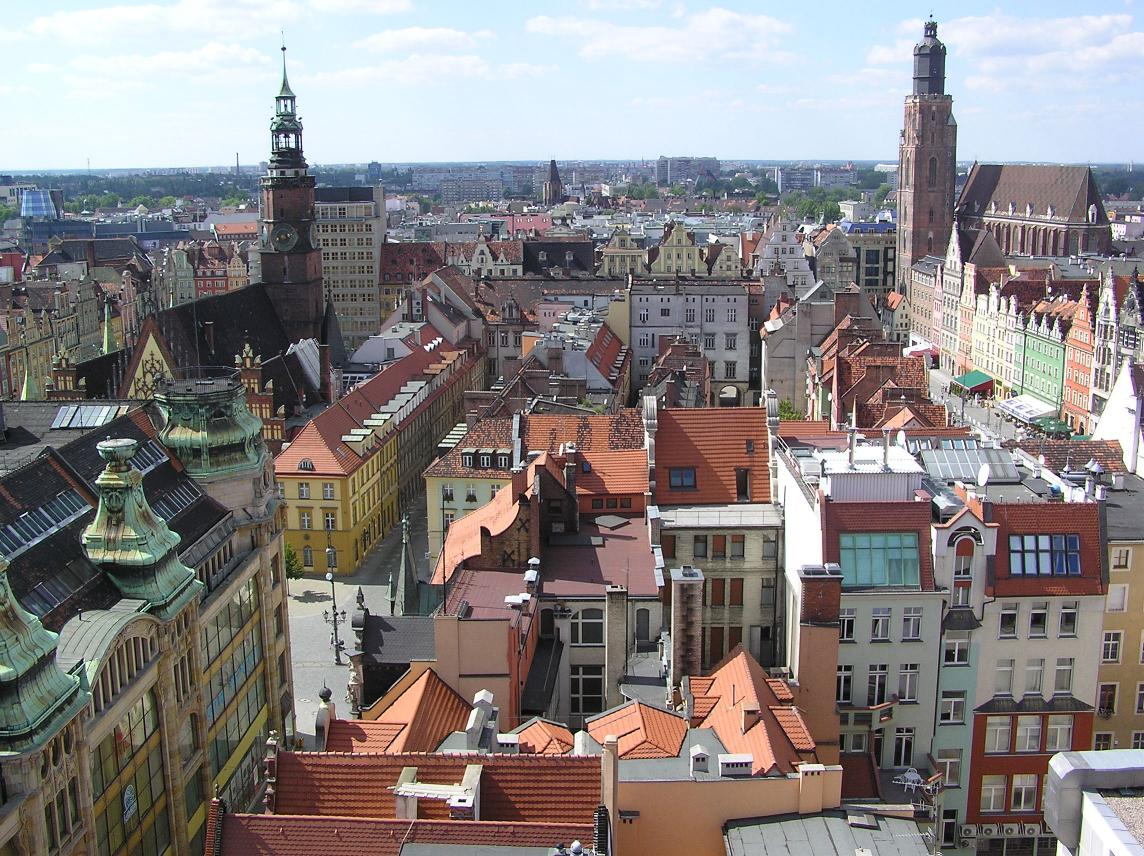

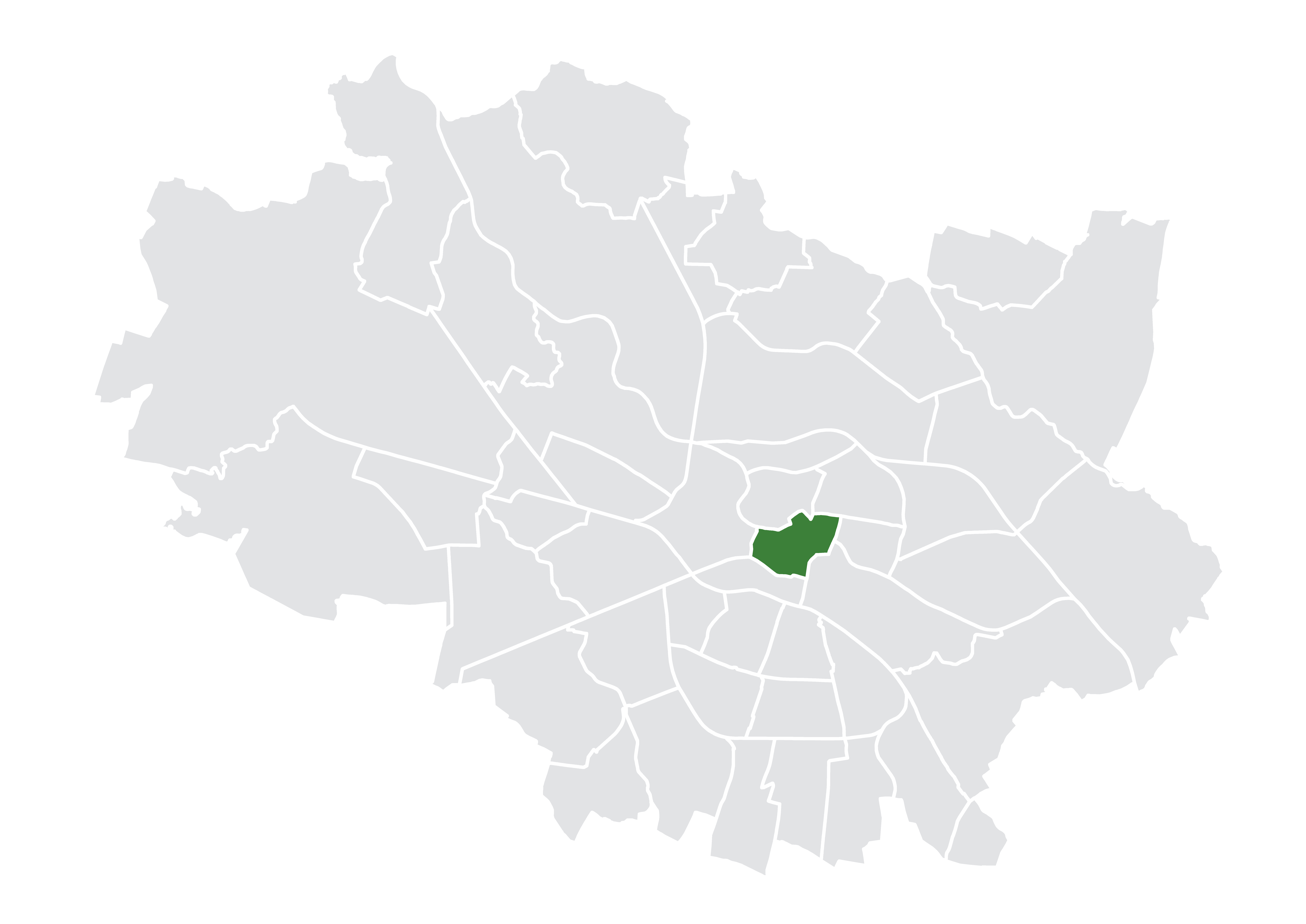
- Location of Old Town within Wrocław
- Country: Poland
- Voivodeship: Lower Silesian
- County/City: Wrocław
- Established: 1991

Population (2022)
  - Total: 8,883
- Time zone: UTC+1 (CET)
  - Summer (DST): UTC+2 (CEST)
- Area code: +48 71

Old Town (Polish: Stare Miasto, [ˈstarɛ ˈmjastɔ]) is a neighbourhood in Wrocław located in the central part of the city. It was established in the territory of the former Old Town district.

== Background ==
In addition to the historic Old Town (the area between the Oder River to the north and the City Moat to the east, south and west), the settlement also includes Ostrów Tumski (bounded by Sienkiewicza Street to the north, Wyszyńskiego Street to the east, Bema Square to the west and the Oder River to the south and west) and the following islands: Bielarska, Słodowa, Młyńska, Piasek, Daliowa and Tamka.

Until the abolition of the division of the city into five districts (the division was in effect from 1952 to 1990), the settlement belonged mostly to the Old Town district and partly to the Downtown district (Ostrów Tumski and islands).
