= Krzyki =

Former borough in Wrocław, Poland

Coordinates: 51°04′48″N 17°03′12″E

- Former borough of Wrocław
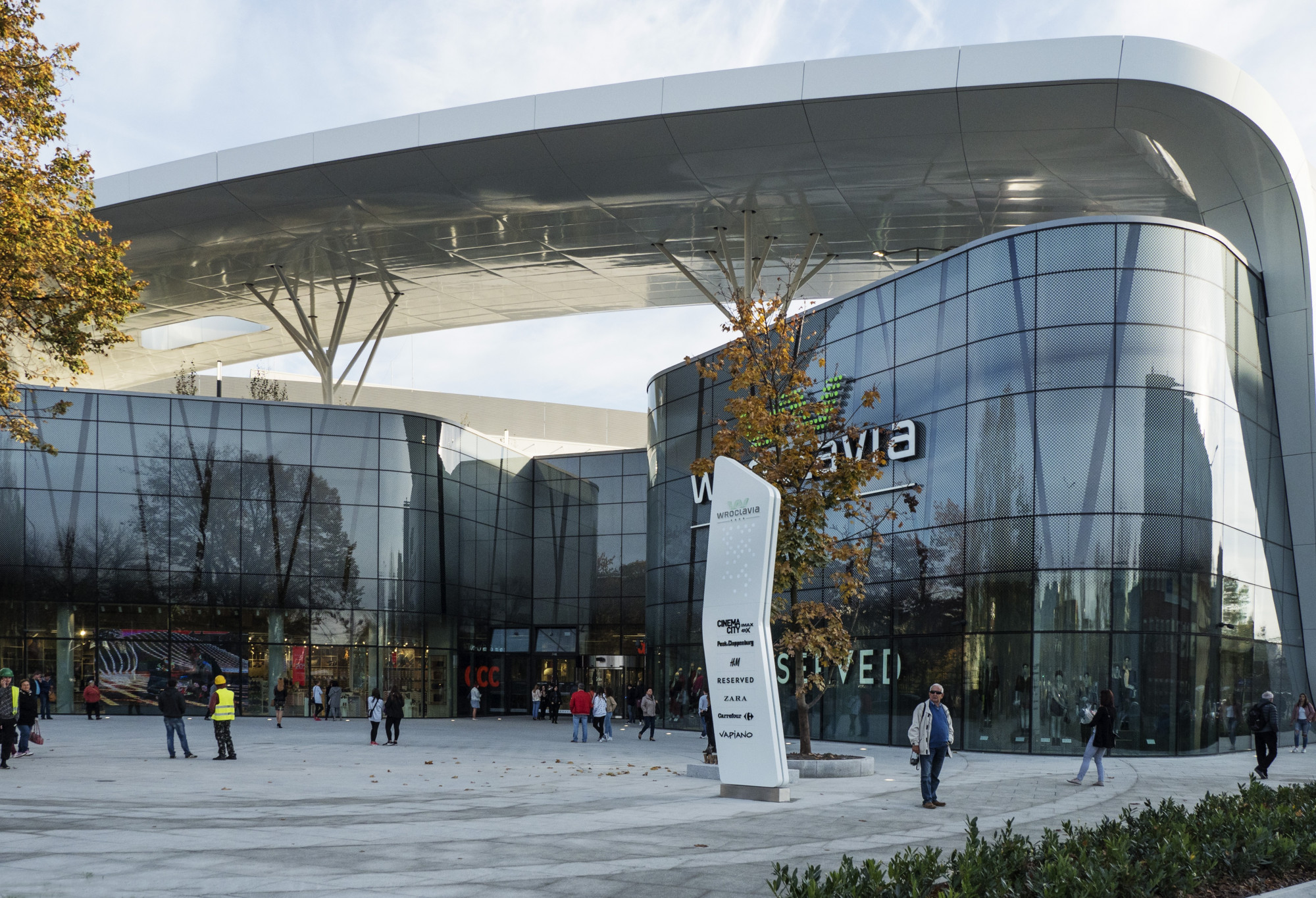
- Shopping mall

- Location of Krzyki within Wrocław
- Country: Poland
- Voivodeship: Lower Silesian
- County/City: Wrocław
- Established: 1952
- Dissolved: 1990

Population (2022)
  - Total: 170,877
- Time zone: UTC+1 (CET)
  - Summer (DST): UTC+2 (CEST)
- Area code: +48 71

Krzyki (Polish: [ˈkʂɨkʲi]; German: Krietern [ˈkʁiːtɐn]) is a former borough of Wrocław, Poland located in the southern part of the city.

On March 21, 1991, the newly created City Office of Wrocław assumed many of the functions previously carried out within the borough. The name, though, remained in use, mainly for statistical and administrative purposes.

== Subdivision ==
Since 1991, Krzyki has been divided into 14 districts:

- Przedmieście Oławskie
- Tarnogaj
- Huby
- Powstańców Śląskich
- Gaj
- Borek
- Księże
- Brochów
- Bieńkowice
- Jagodno
- Wojszyce
- Ołtaszyn
- Krzyki-Partynice
- Klecina

== See also ==
- Districts of Wrocław
