= Gaj, Wrocław =

District in Wrocław, Poland

Gaj
- District of Wrocław
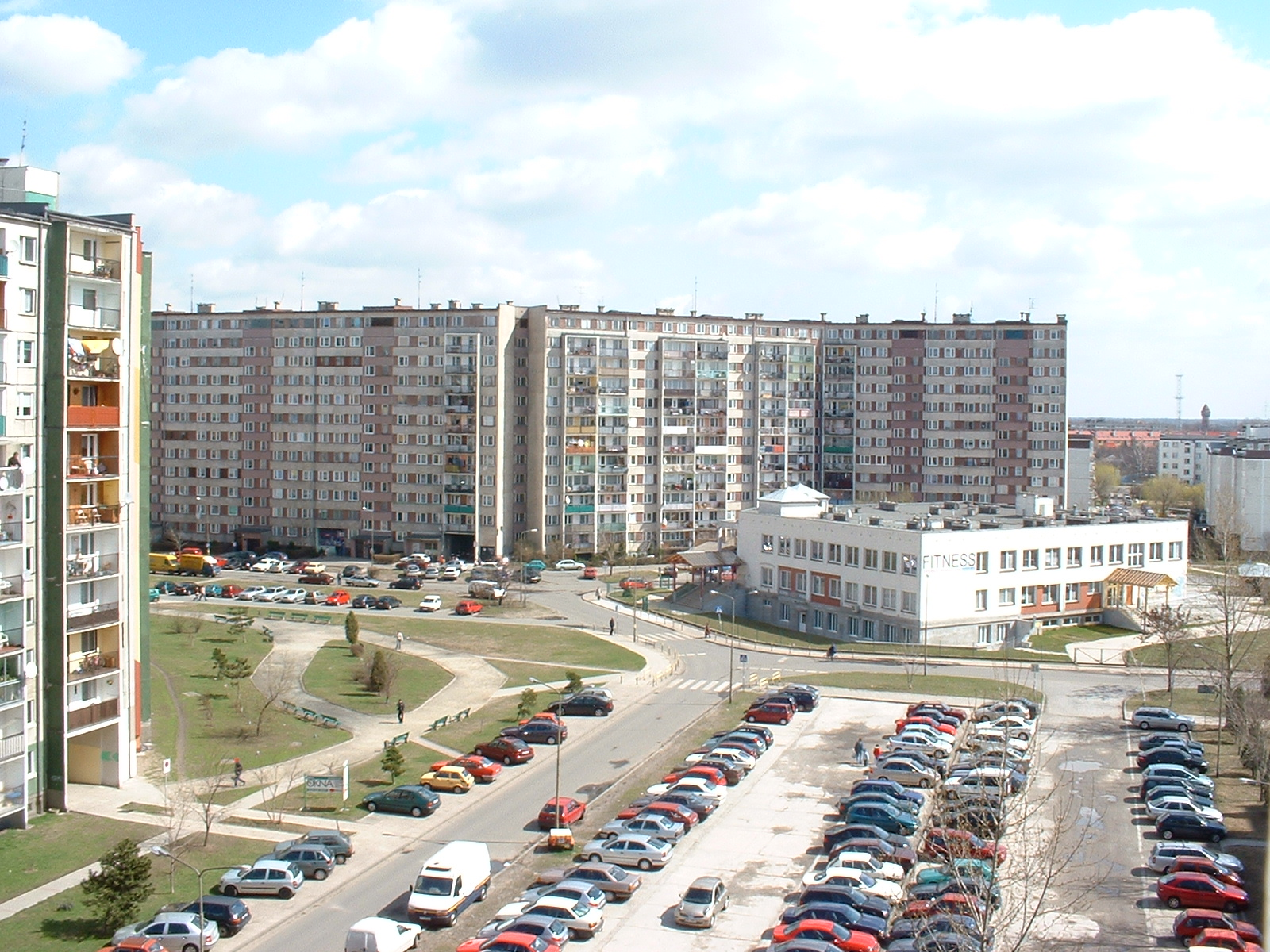

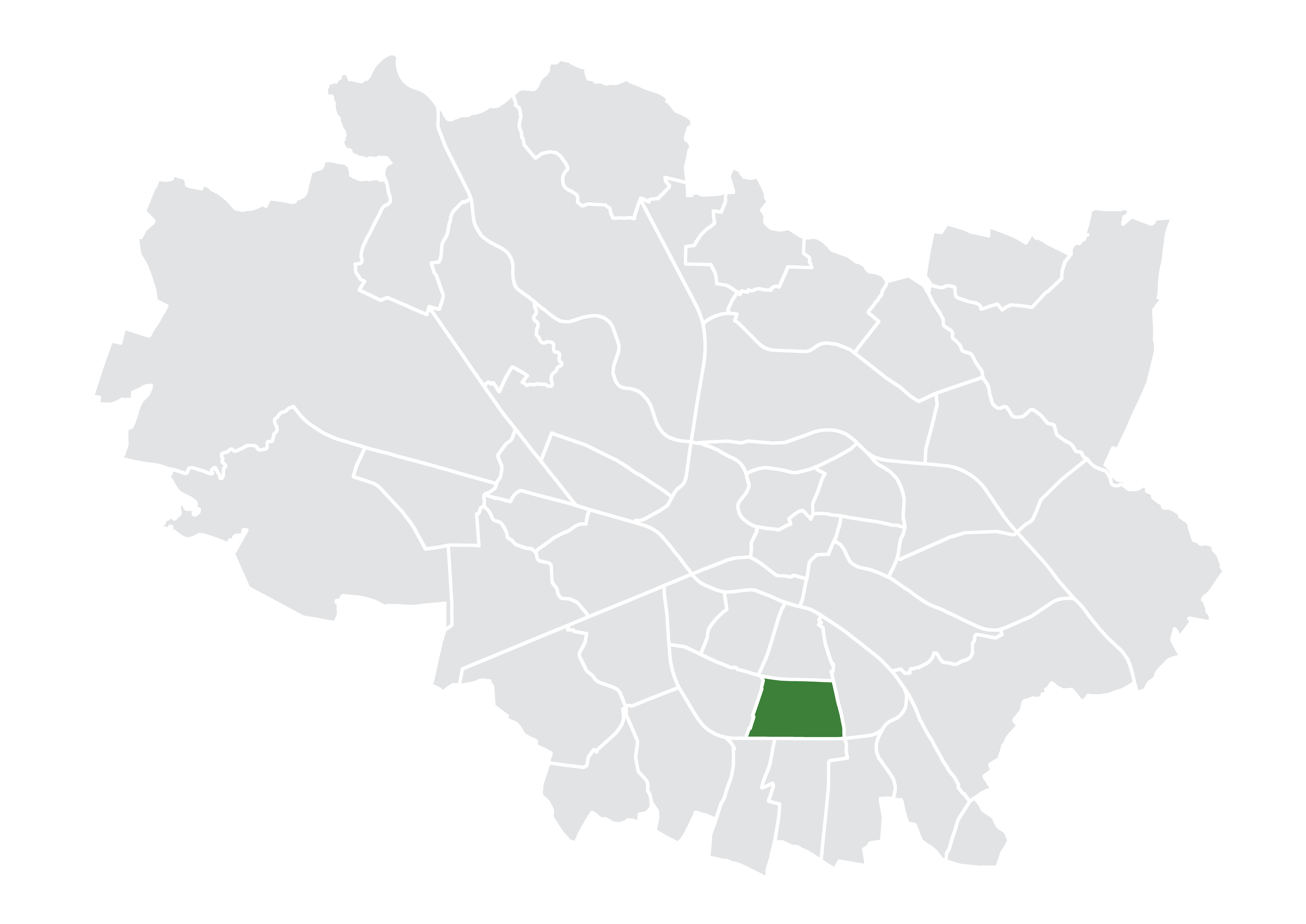
- Location of Gaj within Wrocław
- Country: Poland
- Voivodeship: Lower Silesian
- County/City: Wrocław
- First mentioned: 1273
- Incorporated into the city: 1904
- Established the modern-day district: 1991

Population (2022)
  - Total: 19,136
- Time zone: UTC+1 (CET)
  - Summer (DST): UTC+2 (CEST)
- Area code: +48 71

Gaj (Polish pronunciation: [gaj], German: Herdain, [ˈhɛɐ̯daɪ̯n]) is a district in Wrocław, Poland, located in the southern part of the city. It was established in the territory of the former Krzyki district.

Initially a village, the settlement was incorporated into Breslau (today's Wrocław) in 1904.

== History ==
The earliest record of the settlement of Gayn dates back to 1273. The village was also mentioned by the name of Herdain, thought to derive from the name Herdan, whose son, Henryk, acquired 5.5 acres of land in the area of the village.

In 1895 a small part of Herdain was incorporated into the borders of Breslau. The border of the then annexed part of the village ran along present-day Działkowa Street. In 1905, Breslau councilors decided to fully incorporate the village to the city.

In 1991, after reforms in the administrative division of Wrocław, Gaj became one of the city's 48 districts.
