= Ołtaszyn =

District in Wrocław, Poland

- District of Wrocław
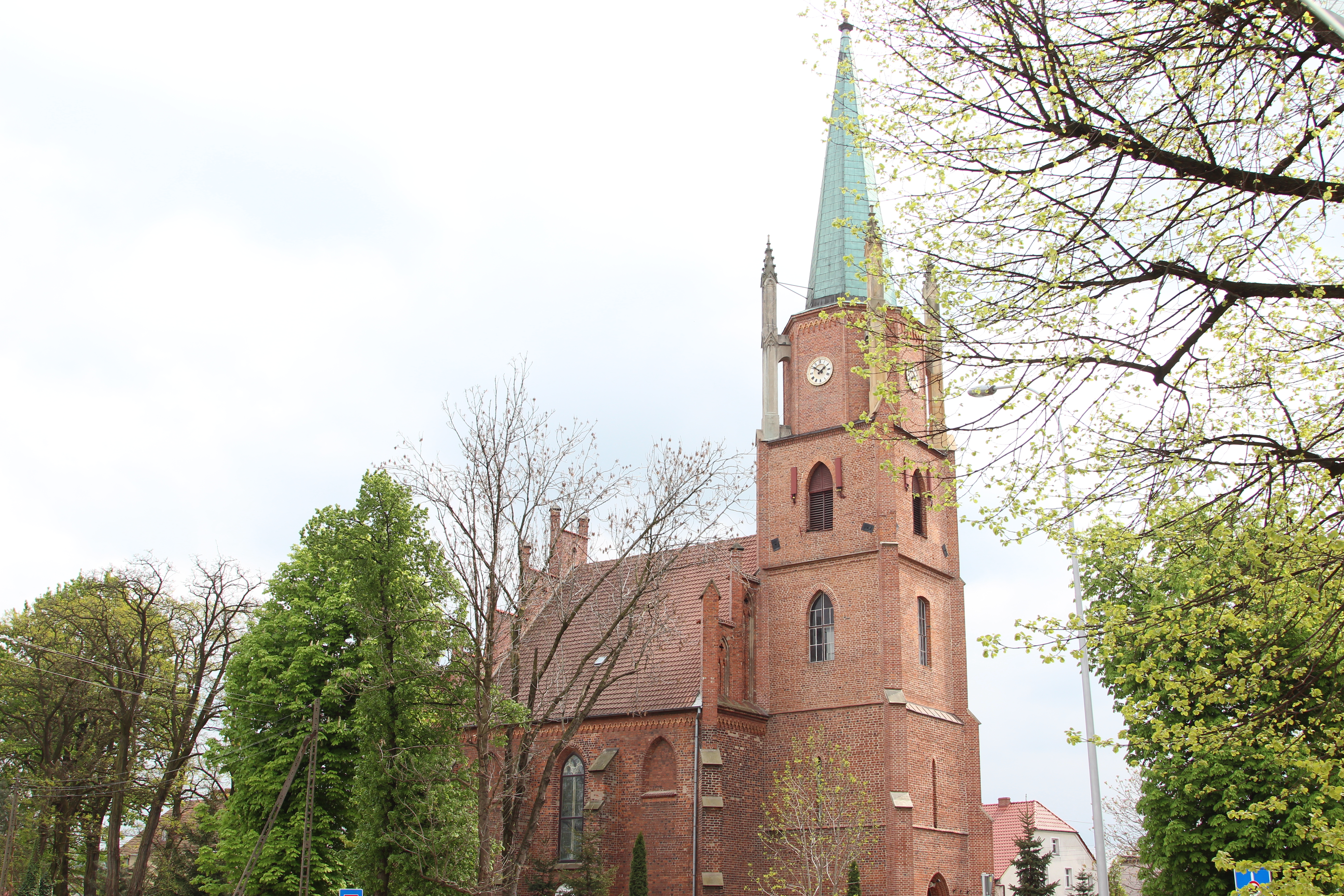
- Church of the Assumption

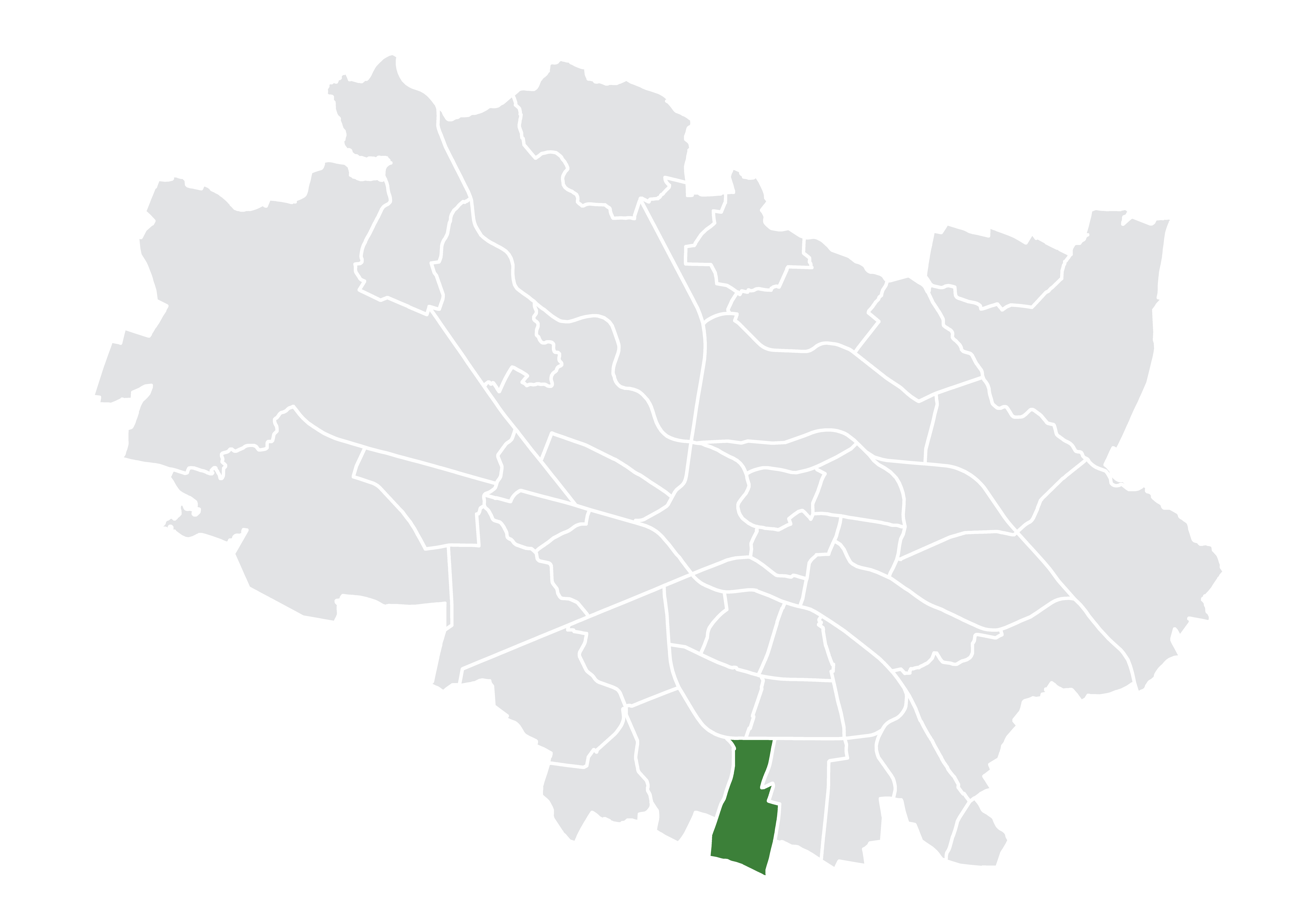
- Location of Ołtaszyn within Wrocław
- Country: Poland
- Voivodeship: Lower Silesian
- County/City: Wrocław
- First mentioned: 1204
- Incorporated into the city: 1951
- Established the modern-day district: 1991

Population (2022)
  - Total: 6,948
- Time zone: UTC+1 (CET)
  - Summer (DST): UTC+2 (CEST)
- Area code: +48 71
- Website: oltaszyn.com.pl

Ołtaszyn (Polish pronunciation: [ɔwˈtaʂɨn], German: Oltaschin, [ˈɔltaʃɪn]) is a district in Wrocław, Poland, located in the southern part of the city. It was established in the territory of the former Krzyki district.

Initially a village, the settlement was incorporated into Wrocław in 1951.

== Name ==
Throughout its history, the village was recorded as Oltachino, Oltacino, Oltaschin, and Oltaczin.

Until 1937, the Germans called the village Oltaschin. Later, in the Nazi era, the settlement was renamed to Herzogshufen to erase traces of Polish origin. For the first post-war years the village was called Ołtarzyn. The current name of Ołtaszyn has been in effect since the 1950s.

== History ==
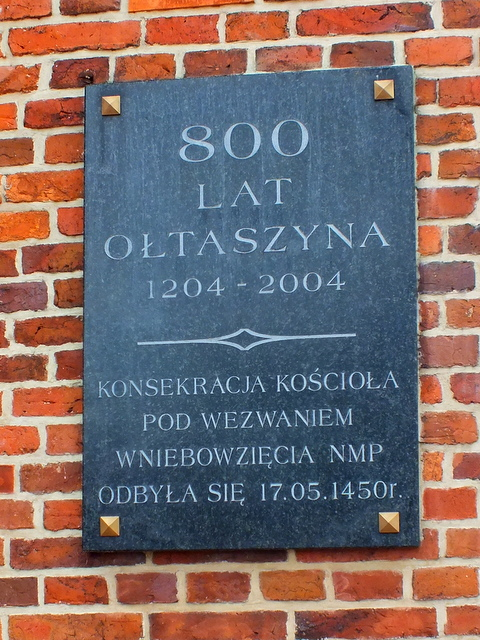
Plaque commemorating the 800th anniversary of Ołtaszyn

Ołtaszyn was first mentioned in 1204, when Henry the Bearded exempted the entire village from paying a tax according to which the village had to give away a cow, pigs or any other cattle. The first church in Ołtaszyn was built in 1238, which burned down in the first half of the 15th century.

In 1921, Breslau (Wrocław) was the most densely populated of the major German cities and the development of its nearby areas became a necessity. The early modern estate in Oltaschin was designed in 1921 by Ernst May. On February 22, 1922, a competition was held for the development of the suburbs.

One distinguishing feature of Ołtaszyn is that the German population continued to reside in the area even after 1945. However, they began to move out in the 1950s and 1960s. Ołtaszyn is considered to be one of the settlements in Wrocław that was Germanized for the longest period of time.

In 1991, after reforms in the administrative division of Wrocław, Ołtaszyn became one of the city's 48 districts.

Since early 2000s, the districts has experienced a rapid growth with a number of new developments, both individual and multi-family housing, becoming a highly desirable area to live. This has caused a lot of traffic congestion with Zwycięska Street becoming one of the most congested streets in Poland.
