= Wrocław Nadodrze railway station =

Railway station in Wrocław, Poland

Wrocław Nadodrze
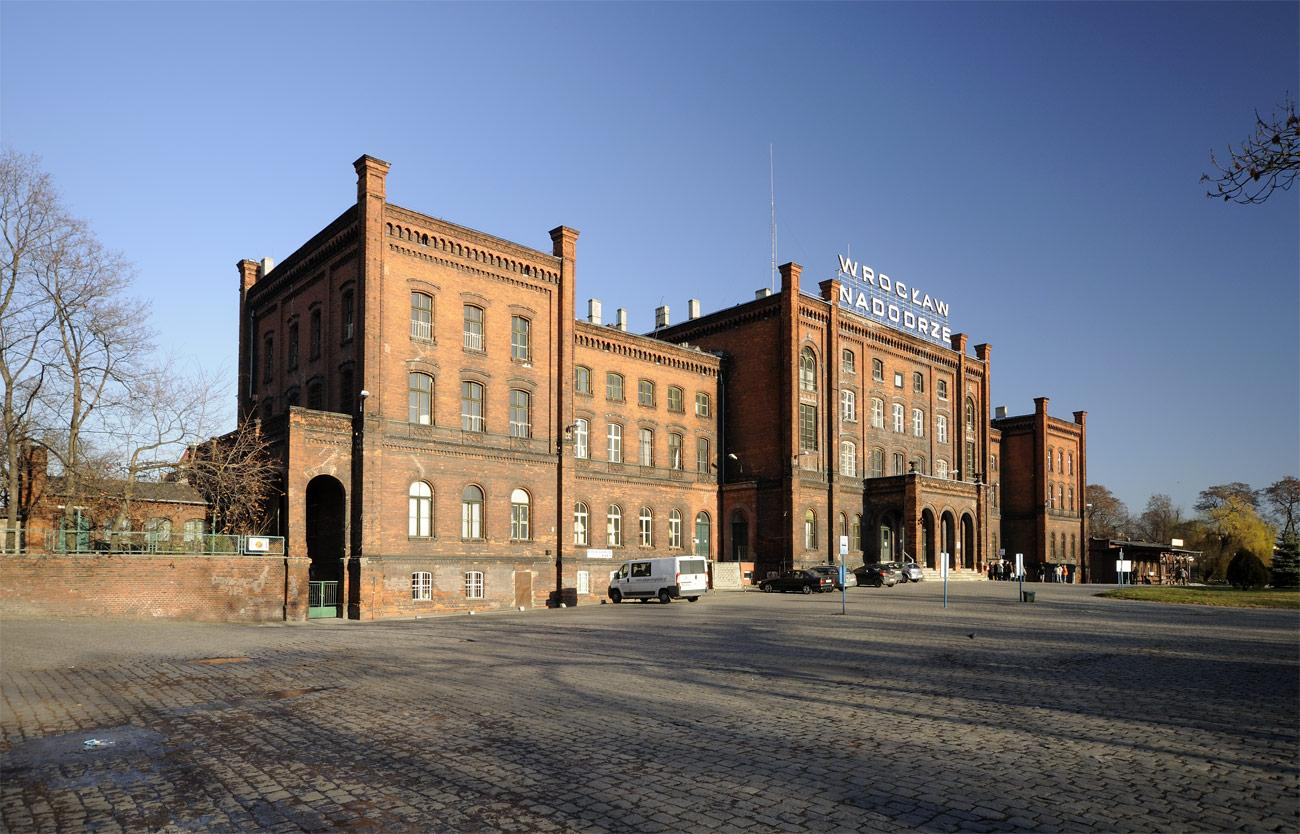
- Wroclaw Nadodrze station building (view from Staszica square)

General information
- Location: Pl. Staszica 50, 50-222; Nadodrze, Wrocław; Poland
- Coordinates: 51°7′32″N 17°1′56″E
- Platforms: 2
- Tracks: 3
- Train operators: PKP Intercity; Polregio; Lower Silesian Railways

History
- Opened: 1868
- Former names: Breslau Odertor
Location
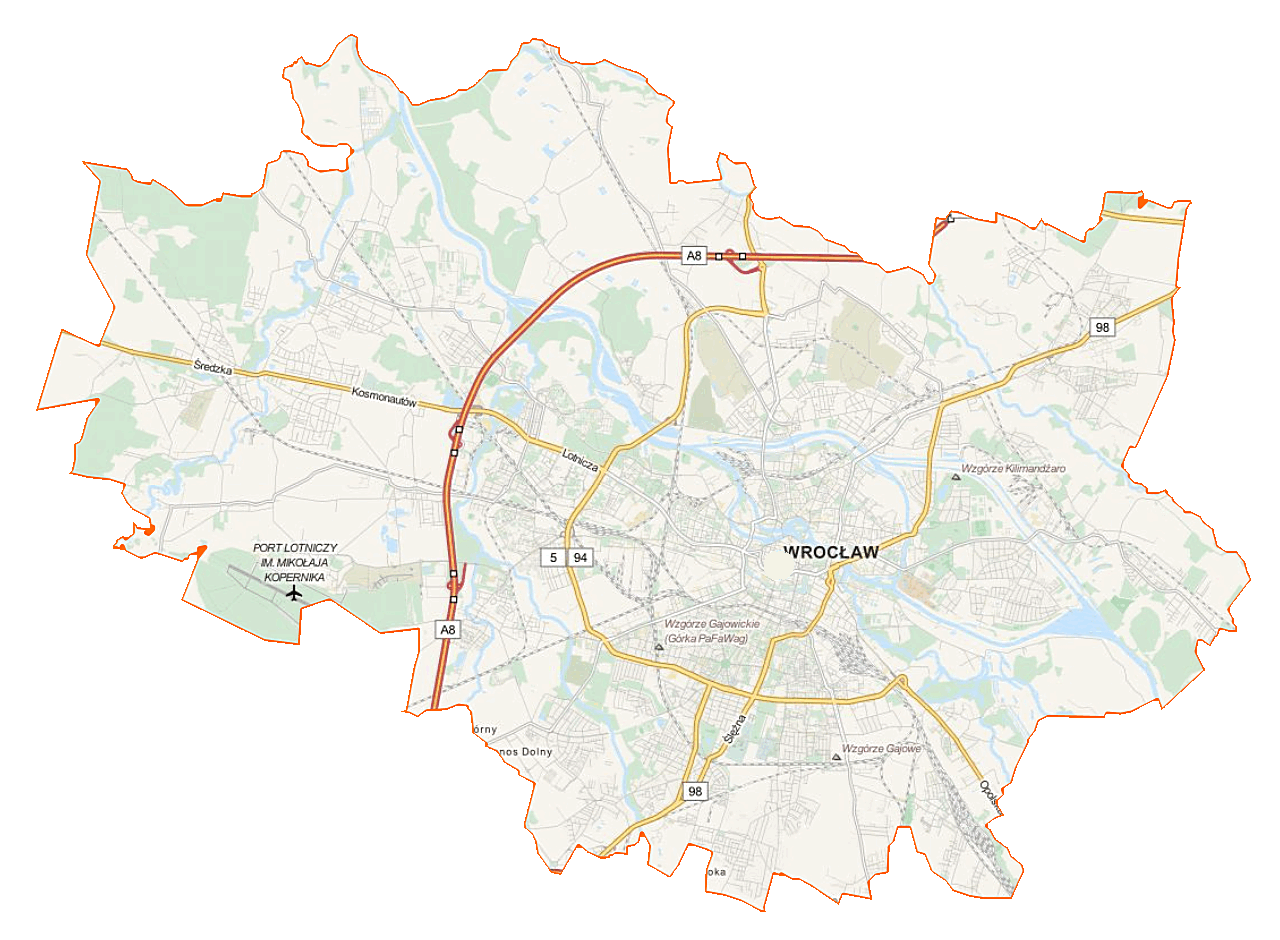
- Location within Wrocław

Wrocław Nadodrze is a railway station in Wrocław, Poland. The station was established in 1868 according to a design by Hermann Grapow. The station is located on railway line no. 143, connecting Kalety and Wrocław Popowice, near Powstańców Wielkopolskich Square in the Nadodrze district. It serves as an important station within the Lower Silesian Metropolitan Railway and for intra-city transport.

== History ==
The Wrocław Nadodrze Station, opened on May 28, 1868, initially connected Wrocław to Oleśnica via Psie Pole, with the full Wrocław–Fosowskie route launched later that year. Built by the Opole-Tarnowskie Góry Railway, it was first named Rechte-Oder-Ufer-Thorbahnhof and later Breslau Odertor.

After World War II, in July 1945, it became Wrocław's first operational station for eastern trains. The city's first post-war tram line connected the station to Biskupin, a route still active today.

== Station Building ==
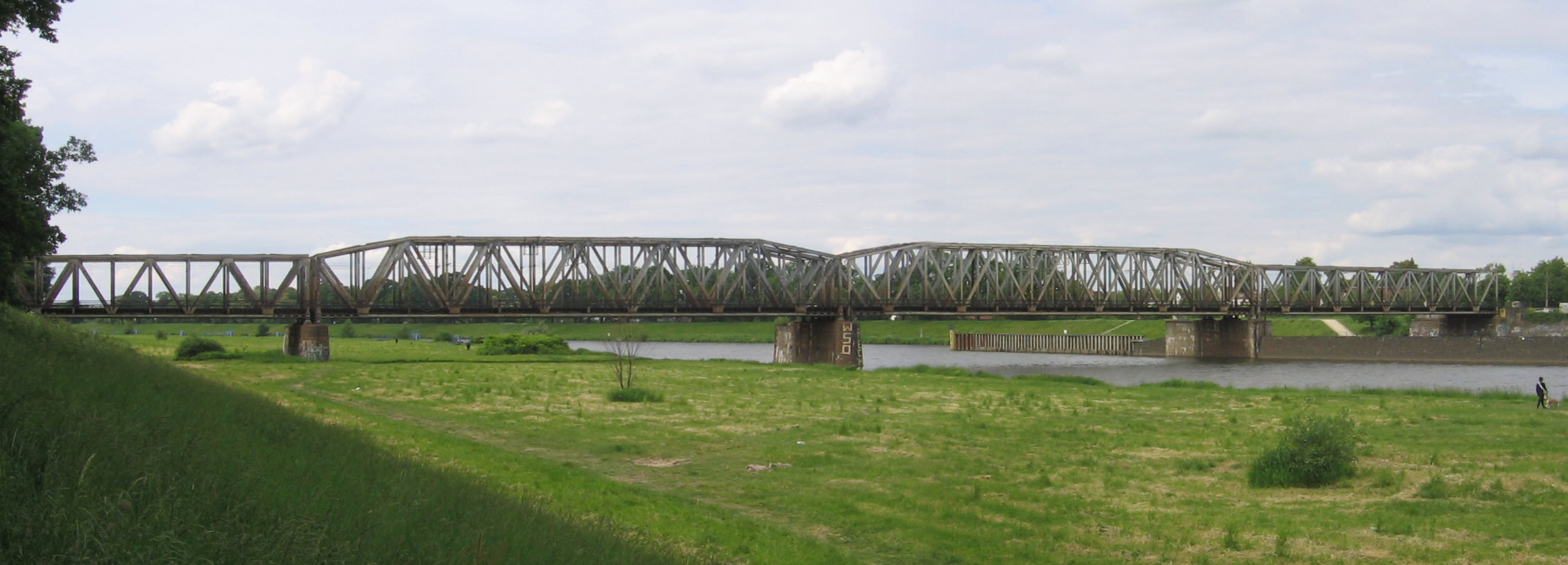
A steel railway bridge over the Old Oder, located between Kleczków and Karłowice, is part of the line connecting Wrocław Nadodrze to the east, passing through Sołtysowice and Psie Pole to Oleśnica.

The Wrocław Nadodrze station, built from unplastered red brick, spans 190 meters and reflects the historicist styles popular in 1860s Germany. The three-story structure features three projections, with the central one rising four stories and fronted by an arched portico. Modernization began in 1912 and was completed in the 1920s, updating tunnels, platforms, and freight facilities.

The station serves regional and long-distance passenger trains from operators like PKP Intercity, Polregio, and Lower Silesian Railways. Staszica Square, in front of the station, hosts bus terminals connecting northern towns, functioning as a smaller secondary bus hub.

Until 1950, the nearby narrow-gauge railway station (Wrocław Wąskotorowy) linked to Trzebnica, but this line and its stations were gradually closed by the 1960s.

In 2009, the station building was transferred from PKP to the Lower Silesian Voivodeship Marshal's Office. It was then handed over to the regional branch of the Polregio company for use as a future headquarters.

Since 2022, the owner of Wrocław Nadodrze station is DL Invest Group, which plans to modernize the building. The station will continue to function as a railway station, with additional office, dining, and retail spaces.

== Passenger Traffic ==
The station serves trains of nearly all categories from most passenger carriers in Lower Silesia, including PKP InterCity, Polregio, and Lower Silesian Railways. Intercity, express, and local trains stop at the station. It offers connections to the following agglomeration railway stations: Wrocław Główny, Bierutów, Kluczbork, Krotoszyn, Oleśnica, Ostrów Wielkopolski, Trzebnica, and Jelcz-Laskowice.

Year	Passenger exchange per hour
2017	700-999
2022	1 400

== Images ==
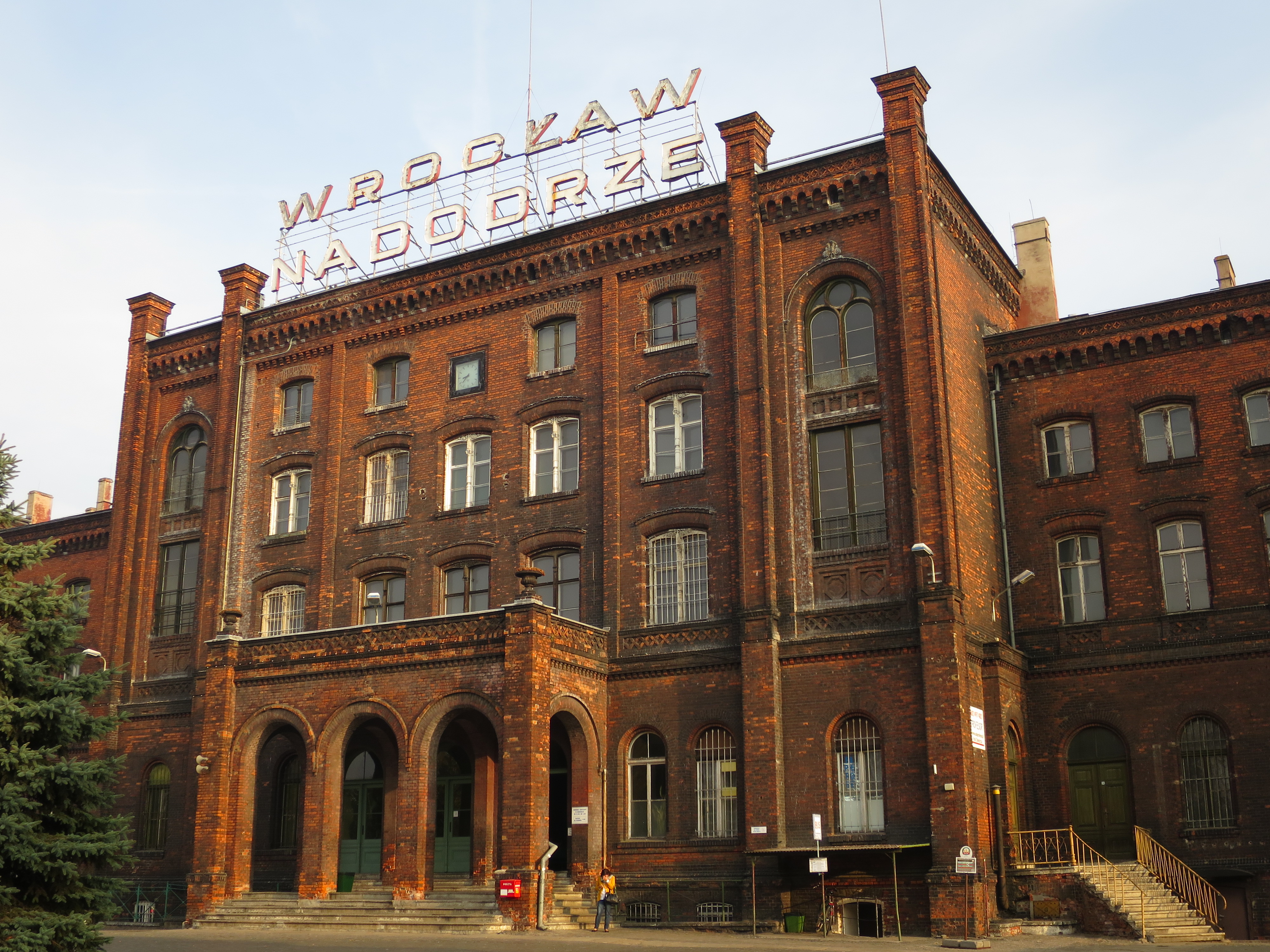
Entrance

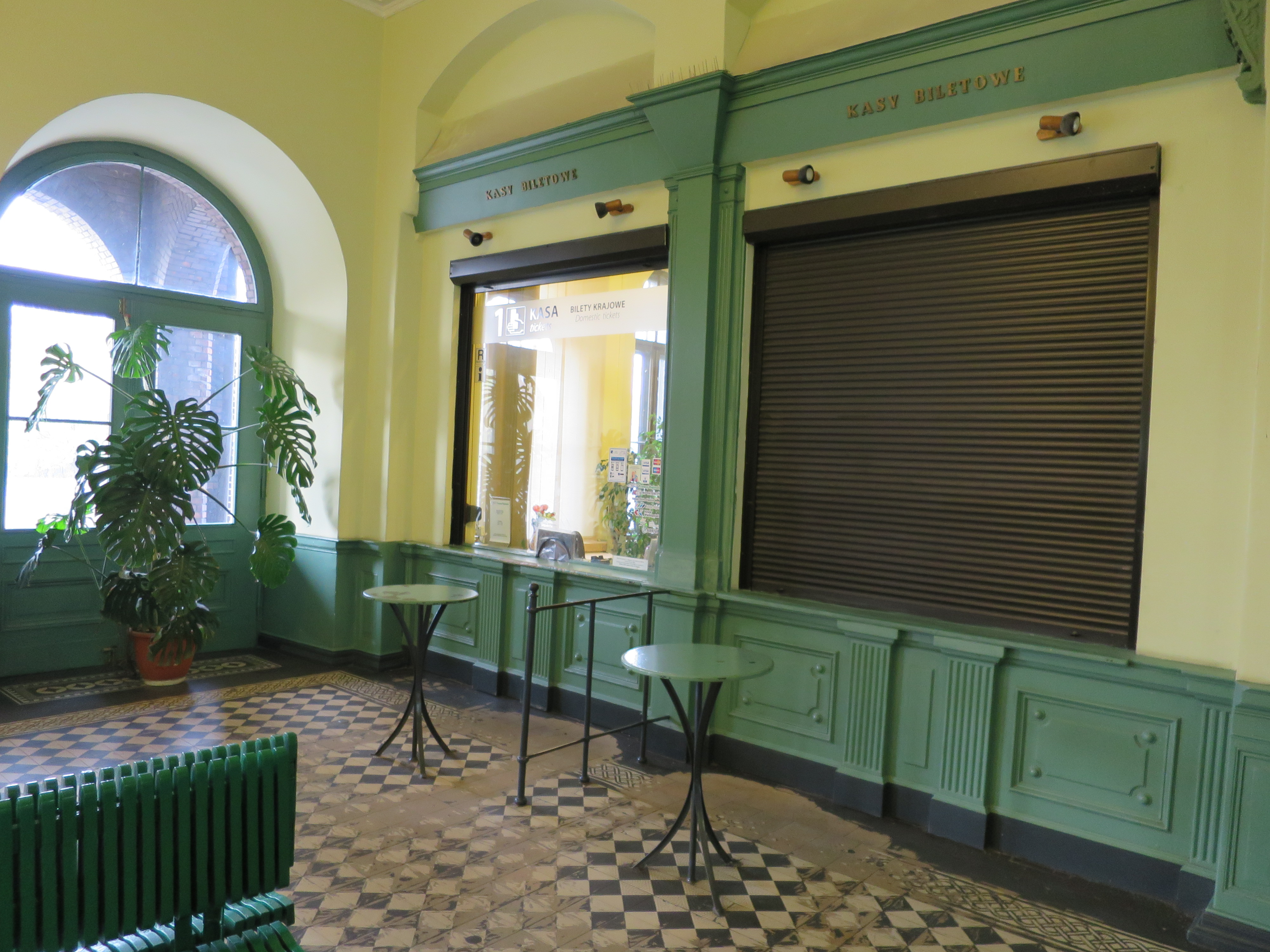
Ticket office

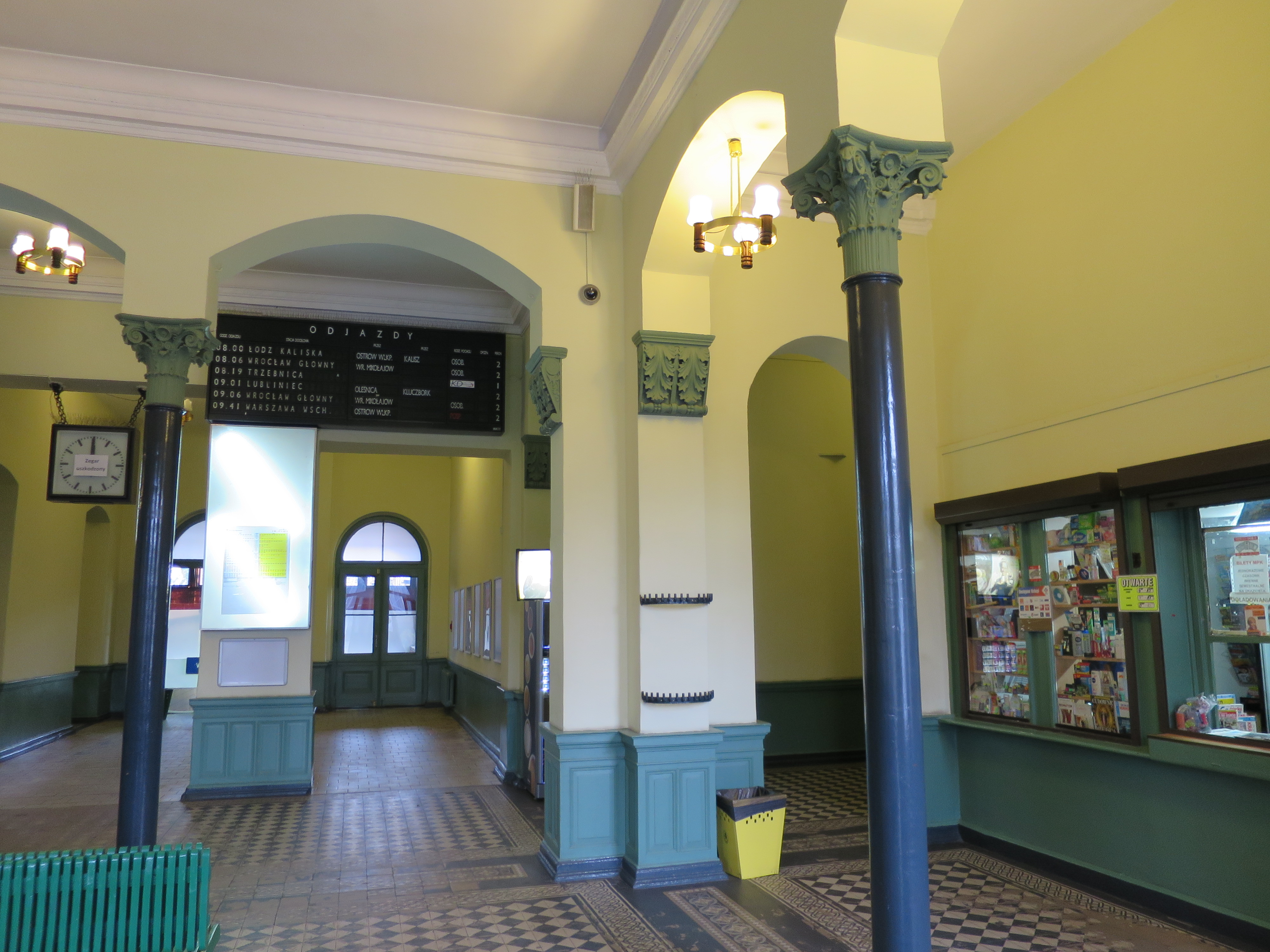
Passage to platforms

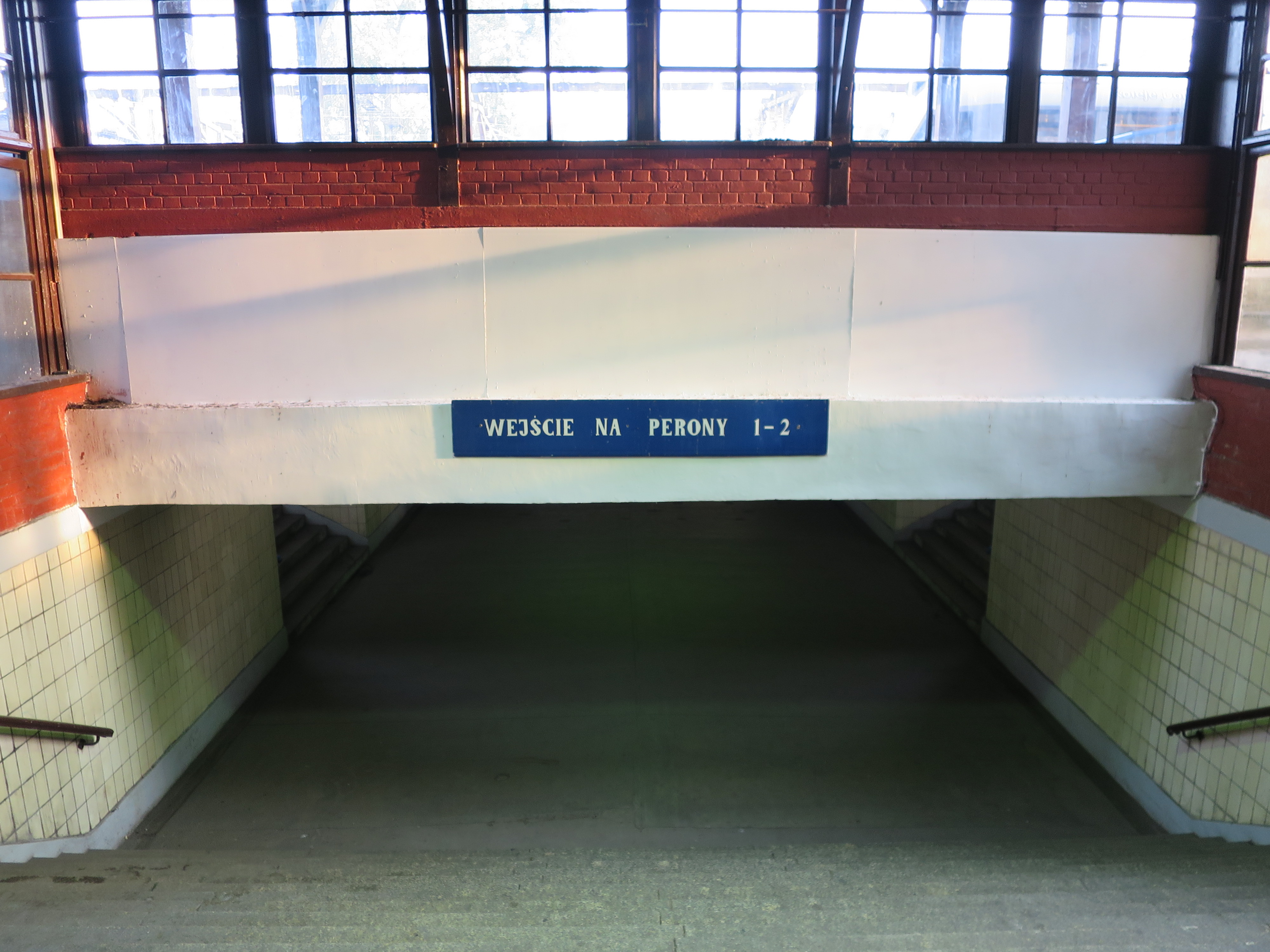
Tunnel entrance

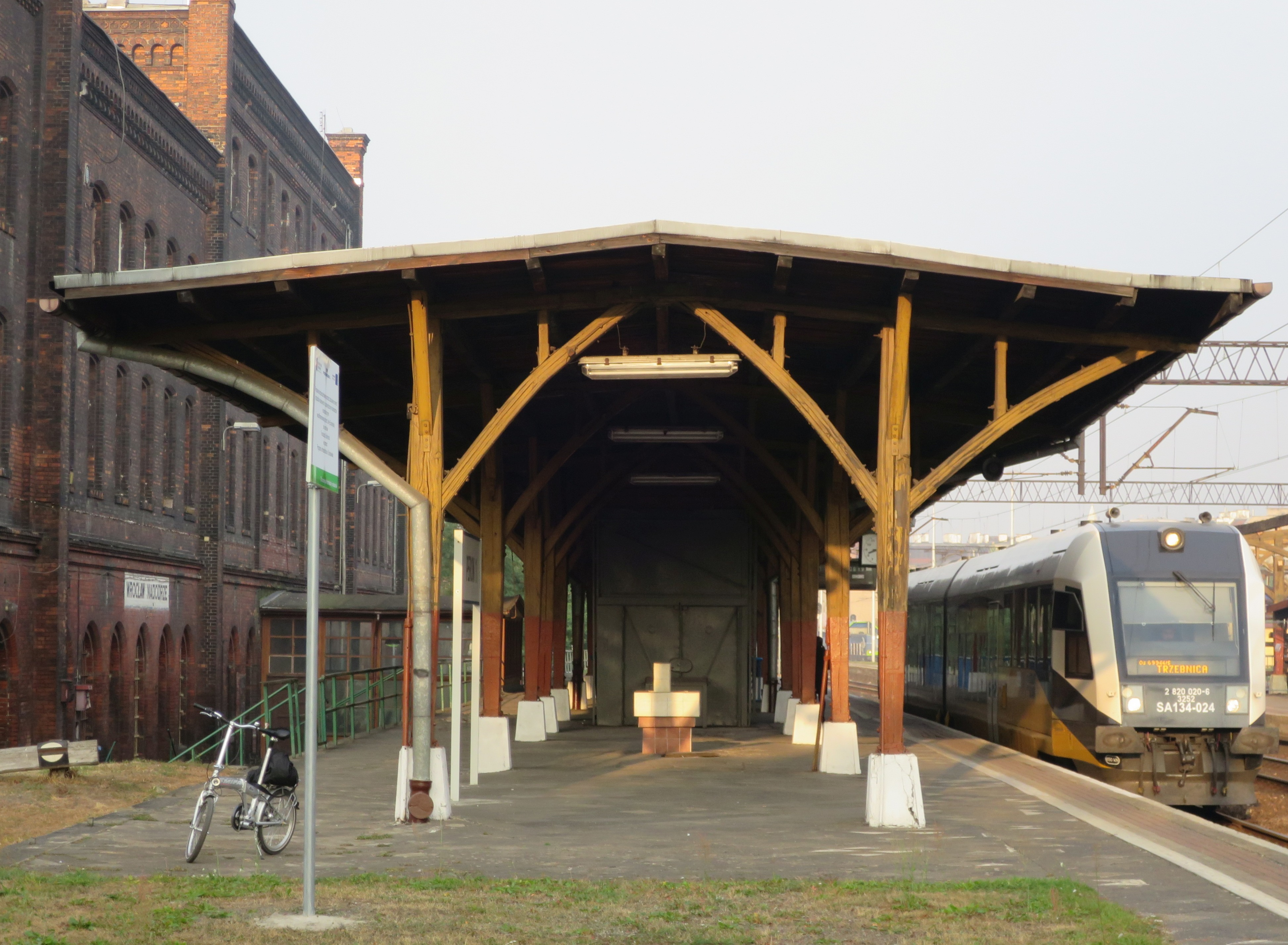
Platform

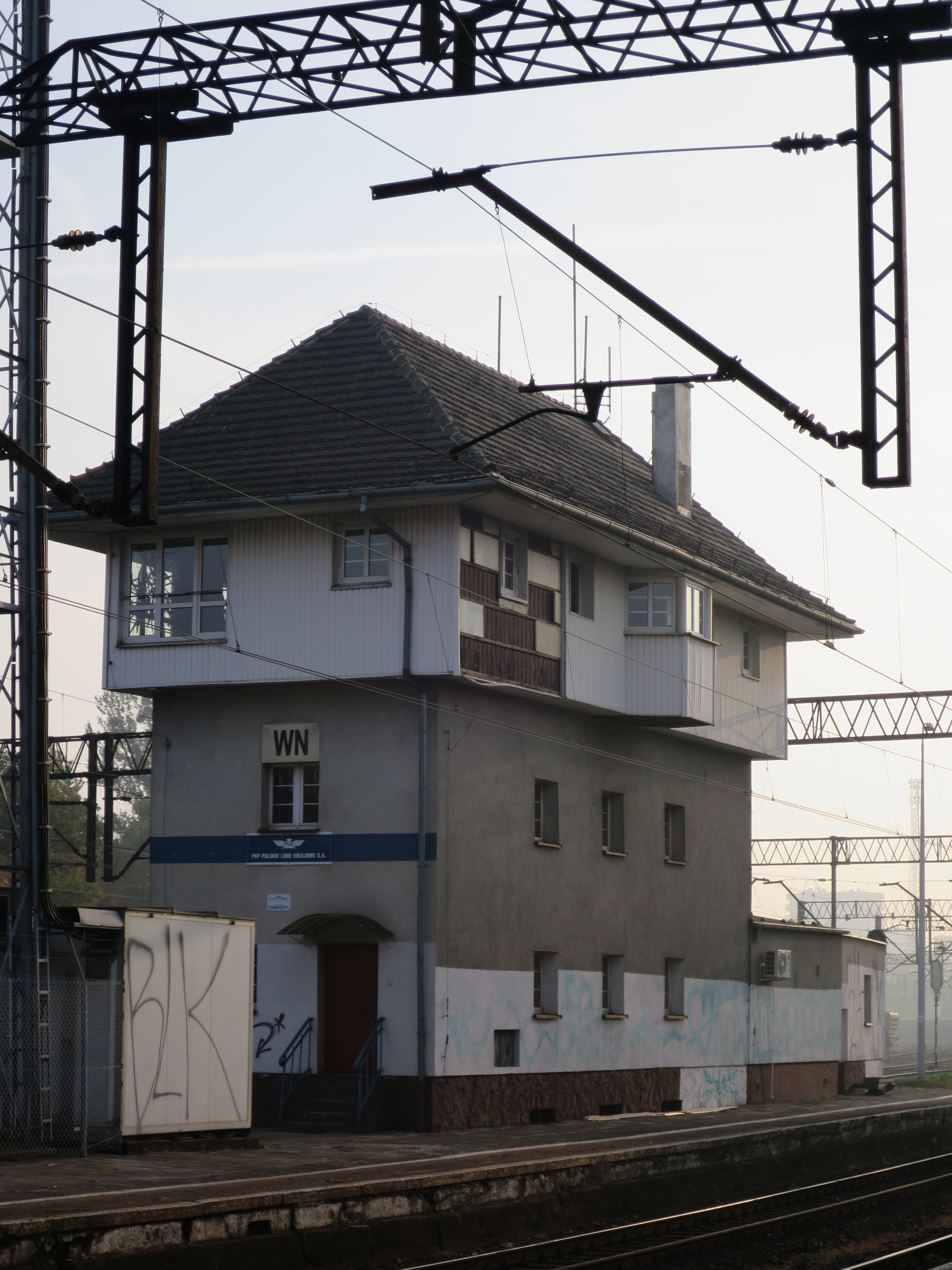
Signal Box

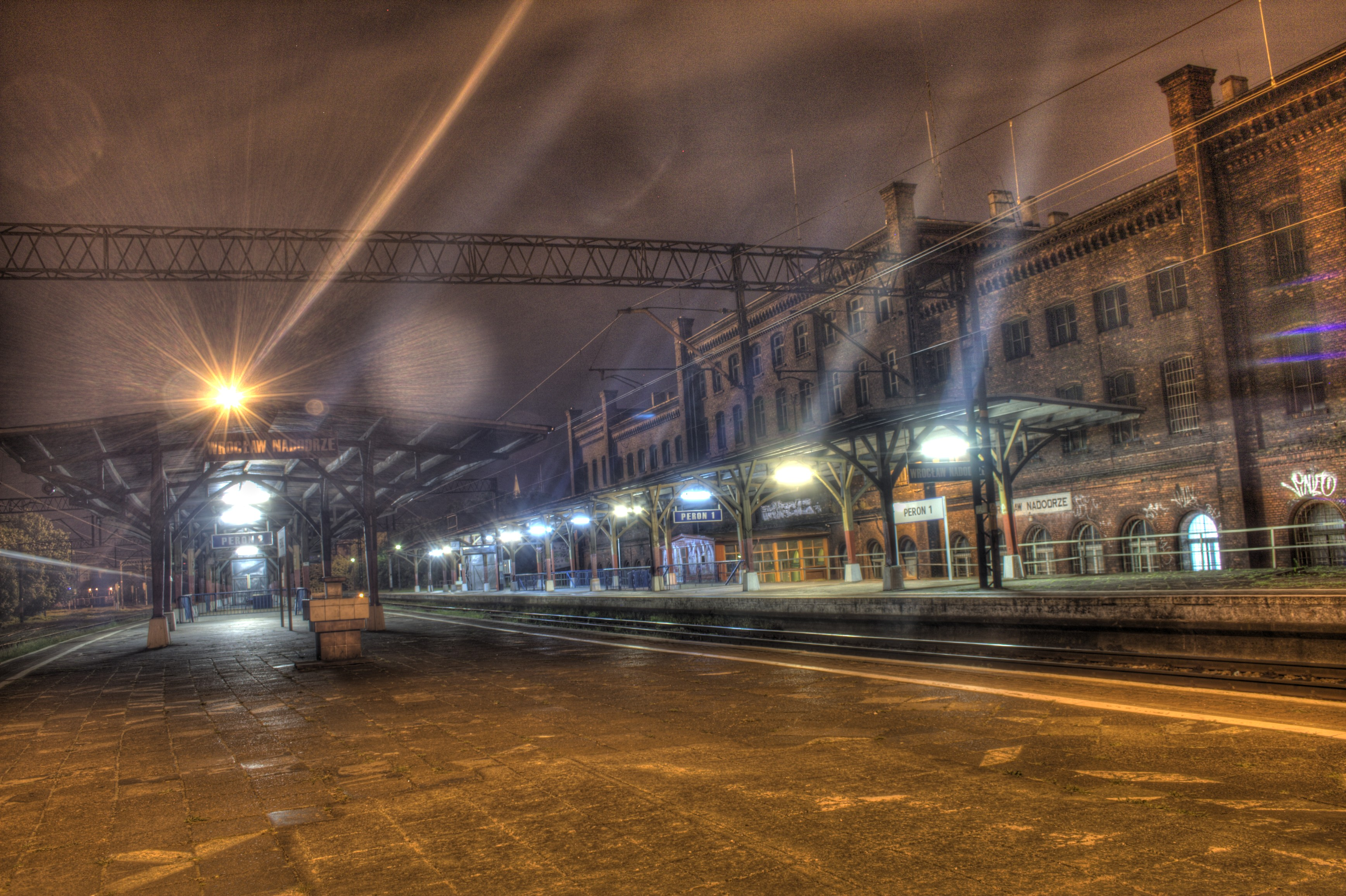
Station at night
