= Grunwald Square (neighbourhood) =

District in Wrocław, Poland

Grunwald Square Plac Grunwaldzki
- District of Wrocław
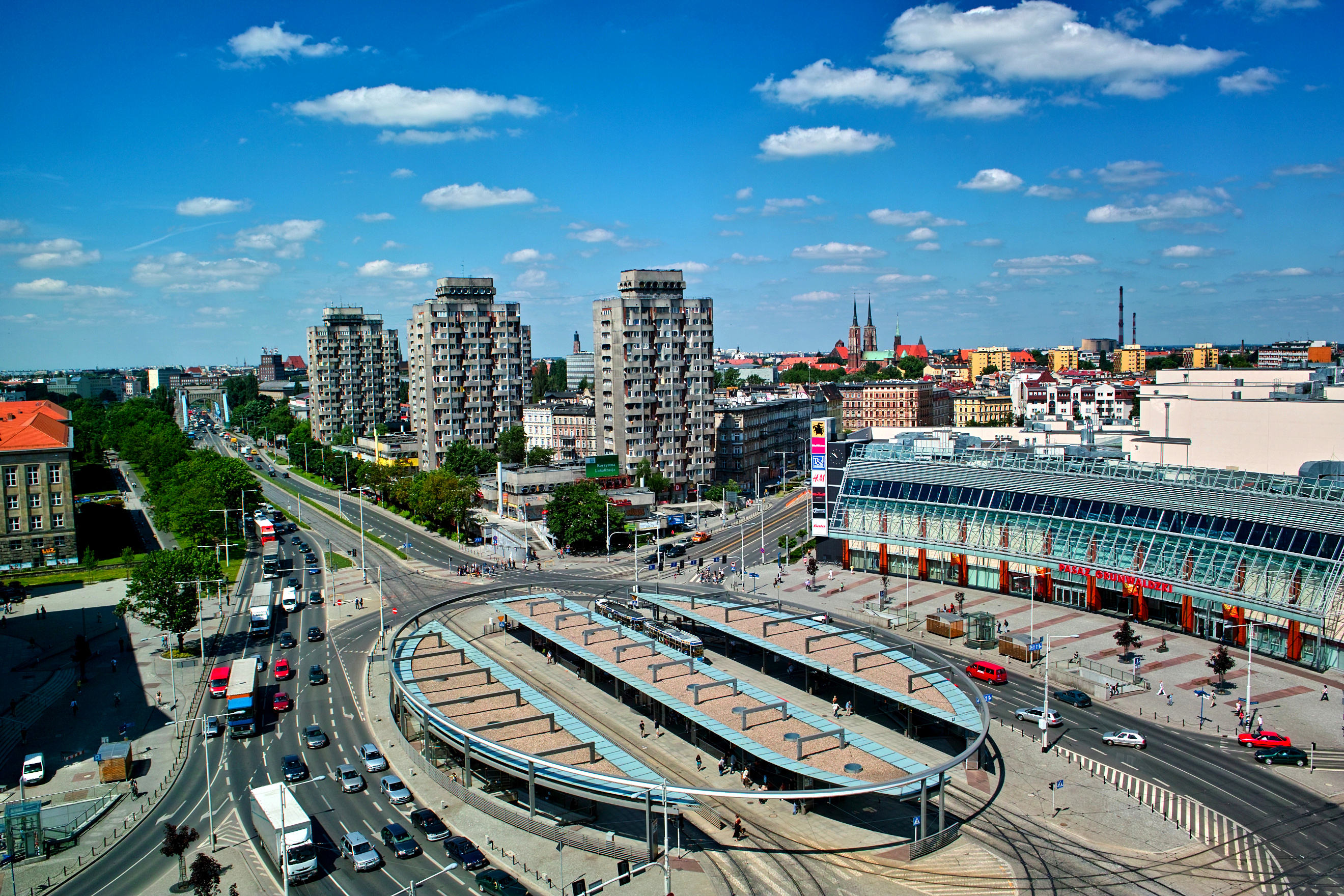

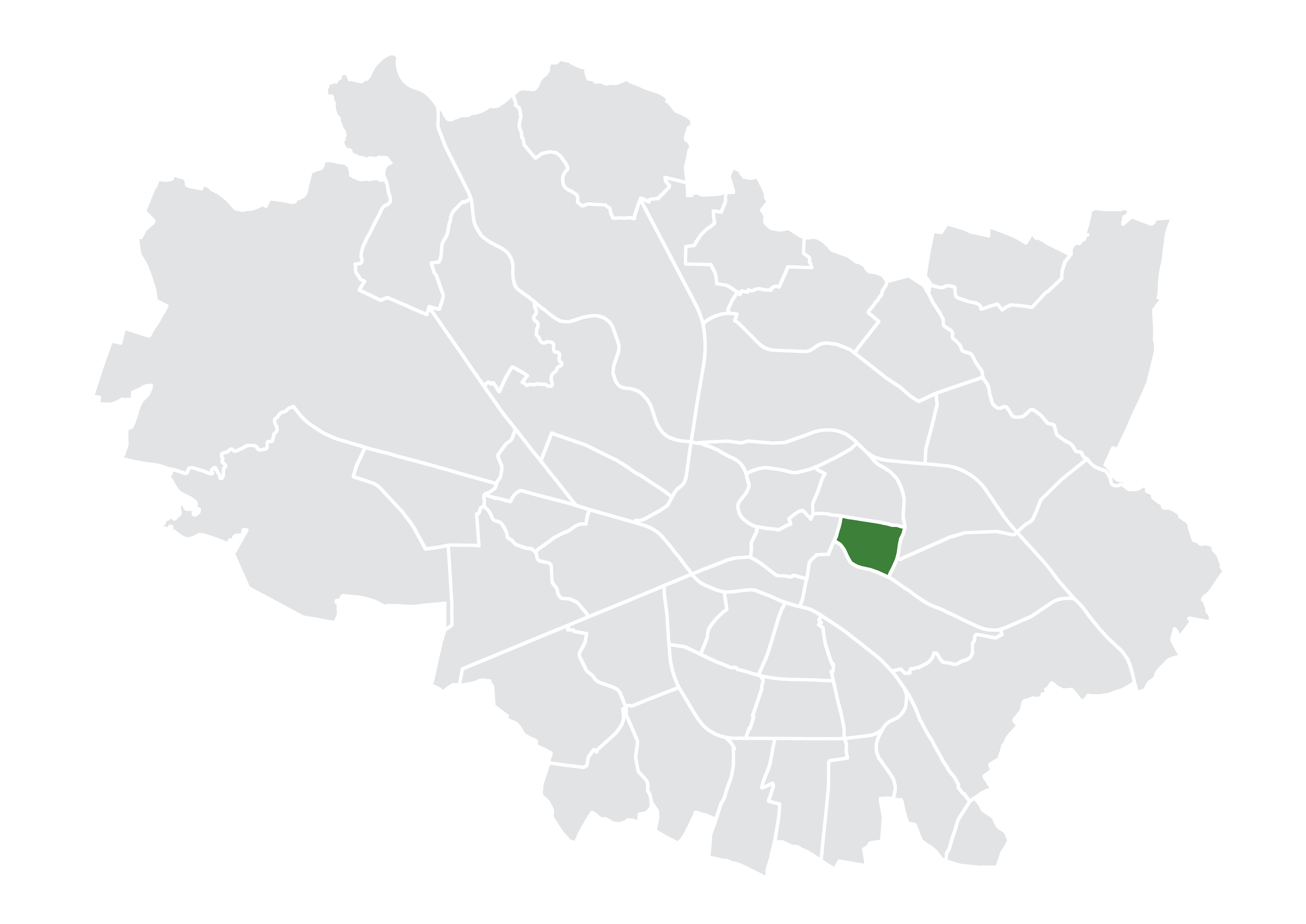
- Location of Grunwald Square within Wrocław
- Country: Poland
- Voivodeship: Lower Silesian
- County/City: Wrocław

Population (2022)
  - Total: 13,187
- Time zone: UTC+1 (CET)
  - Summer (DST): UTC+2 (CEST)
- Area code: +48 71

Grunwald Square (Polish: Plac Grunwaldzki [ˈplad͡z ɡrunˈvalt͡skʲi]) is a district in Wrocław located in the north-eastern part of the city, established in the territory of the former Downtown district.

The name of the district comes from the centrally located Grunwald Square.

== Location ==
The district includes the area defined by Wyszyńskiego Street to the west, and Sienkiewicza and Grunwaldzka Streets to the north. It is also defined by the Oder: Old Oder to the east and the main riverbed to the south.

The German name of the central intersection, Scheitniger Stern ('Scheitnig Star'), and the modern names of Szczytnicki Bridge and Szczytnicka Street are named after the medieval village of Szczytniki, which is now a part of Wrocław and located behind the bridge.

The district also includes the area of the former Fischerau village (sometimes translated to Polish as Rybaki), located near the intersection of Grunwaldzka and Piastowska Streets.

Grunwald Square is adjacent to the Old Town, Ołbin, Zacisze-Zalesie-Szczytniki, Biskupin-Sępolno-Dąbie-Bartoszowice and Przedmieście Oławskie.
