= Ołbin =

District in Wrocław, Poland

- District of Wrocław
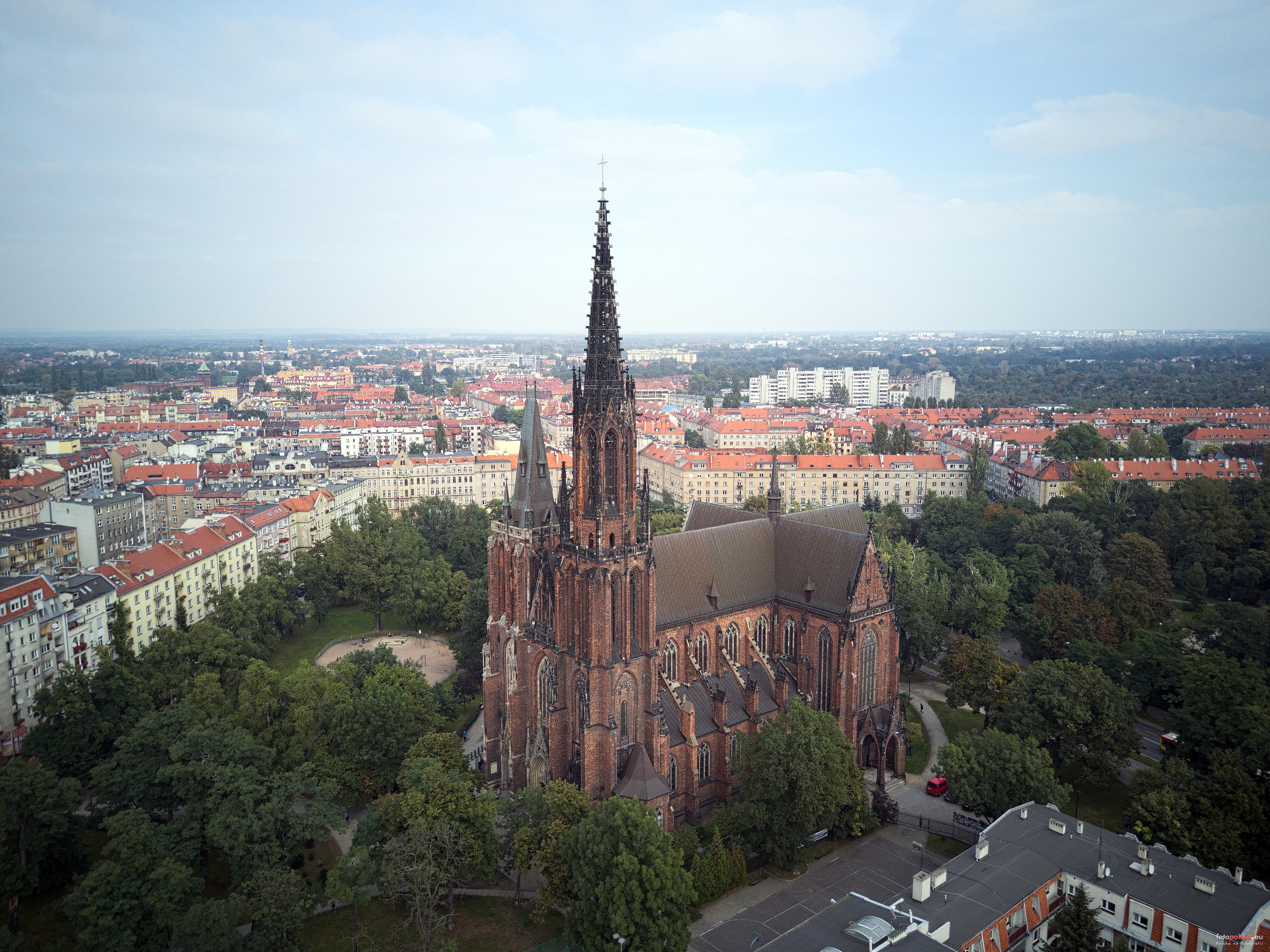
- Saint Michael Archangel church

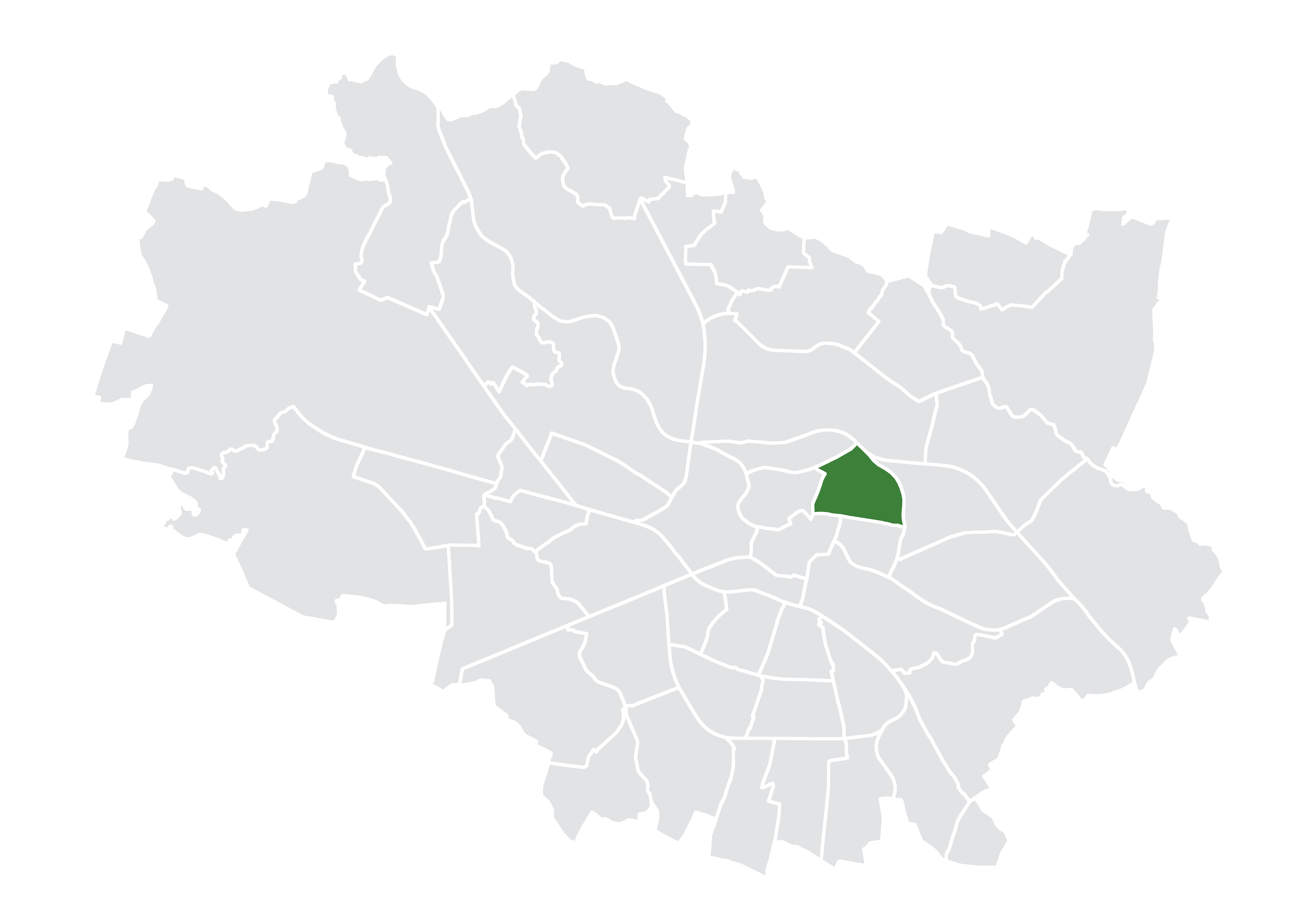
- Location of Ołbin within Wrocław
- Country: Poland
- Voivodeship: Lower Silesian
- County/City: Wrocław
- First mentioned: 1175
- Established the modern-day district: 1991

Population (2022)
  - Total: 31,216
- Time zone: UTC+1 (CET)
  - Summer (DST): UTC+2 (CEST)
- Area code: +48 71
- Website: Osiedle Ołbin

Ołbin (Polish pronunciation: [ˈɔwbin], German: Elbing, [ˈɛlbɪŋ]) is a district in Wrocław, Poland, located in the northern part of the city. It was established in the territory of the former Downtown district.

== Name ==
The settlement was first documented in 1175 under the name Olbin. It was later referred to as Olpinow (1202), Vlbim and Uolbim (1253), Olbina, Albingum, Olbingum, and Elbinga (1264). By the end of the 13th century, the village was known as Olbing.

The origin of the name Ołbin has not been clearly established. According to some historians, the name may derive from the Latin name Albin, which was popular in the 11th and 12th centuries.

The second theory regarding the origin of the name comes from an old Slavic word 'olbąd' ('swan'). Currently, swans of this species can be observed daily at a small pond in Stanisław Tołpa Park, located in the center of the district.

== History ==
=== Abbey of Ołbin ===
The Abbey of Ołbin was founded by Piotr Włostowic in between 1080 and 1153. A sarcophagus was erected for him around 1270 in the middle of the abbey choir. It was probably destroyed in 1529 when the abbey was torn down, and fragments of its architecture were incorporated into buildings in the city. The Breslau City Council made this decision in the face of the threat of Turkish invasion; officially to prevent the complex from being exploited by enemies, but in fact the decision was also part of the resentment against the Catholic monastery complex and its inhabitants.

=== German rule ===
Elbing was outside the borders of Breslau (Wrocław) until the early 19th century. Only a portion of it, which was closely associated with the foreground of the city fortifications protecting the Cathedral Island, was incorporated into the city's administration in the second half of the 18th century. The area, located on the northern bank of the Oder, was frequently plundered by the besieging armies of Breslau. After Napoleon's army captured the city in 1807, the French command decided to demolish the city's fortifications and fill in part of the moat. Soon after, Elbing, along with several other areas bordering the Old Town, was incorporated into the city limits.

=== Post-war ===
The settlement, densely built up mainly with tenement houses, was established at the turn of the 19th and 20th centuries. During the siege of Breslau in 1945, the buildings in the area sustained less damage compared to other parts of the city, such as the neighboring Grunwald Square. Only 30% of the buildings in the neighborhood were damaged.

The present-day districts of Ołbin and Nadodrze played a significant role immediately after the war. Starting in July 1945, Wrocław Nadodrze was the only train station receiving trains from the east. The first streetcar line (No. 1) in Wrocław connected it to Biskupin, a relatively less damaged part of the city. Ołbin and Nadodrze were ideal places for repatriates to settle and for locating post-war city authorities and public institutions due to their well-preserved public and residential infrastructure. The first elementary school was established on Nowowiejska Street, followed by the first high school on Poniatowskiego Street, and the first branch of the Polish Post Office on Jedności Narodowej Street.

In 1991, after reforms in the administrative division of Wrocław, Ołbin became one of the city's 48 districts.
