= Downtown, Wrocław =

Former borough in Wrocław, Poland

Coordinates: 51°06′47″N 17°04′49″E

Downtown Śródmieście
- Former borough of Wrocław
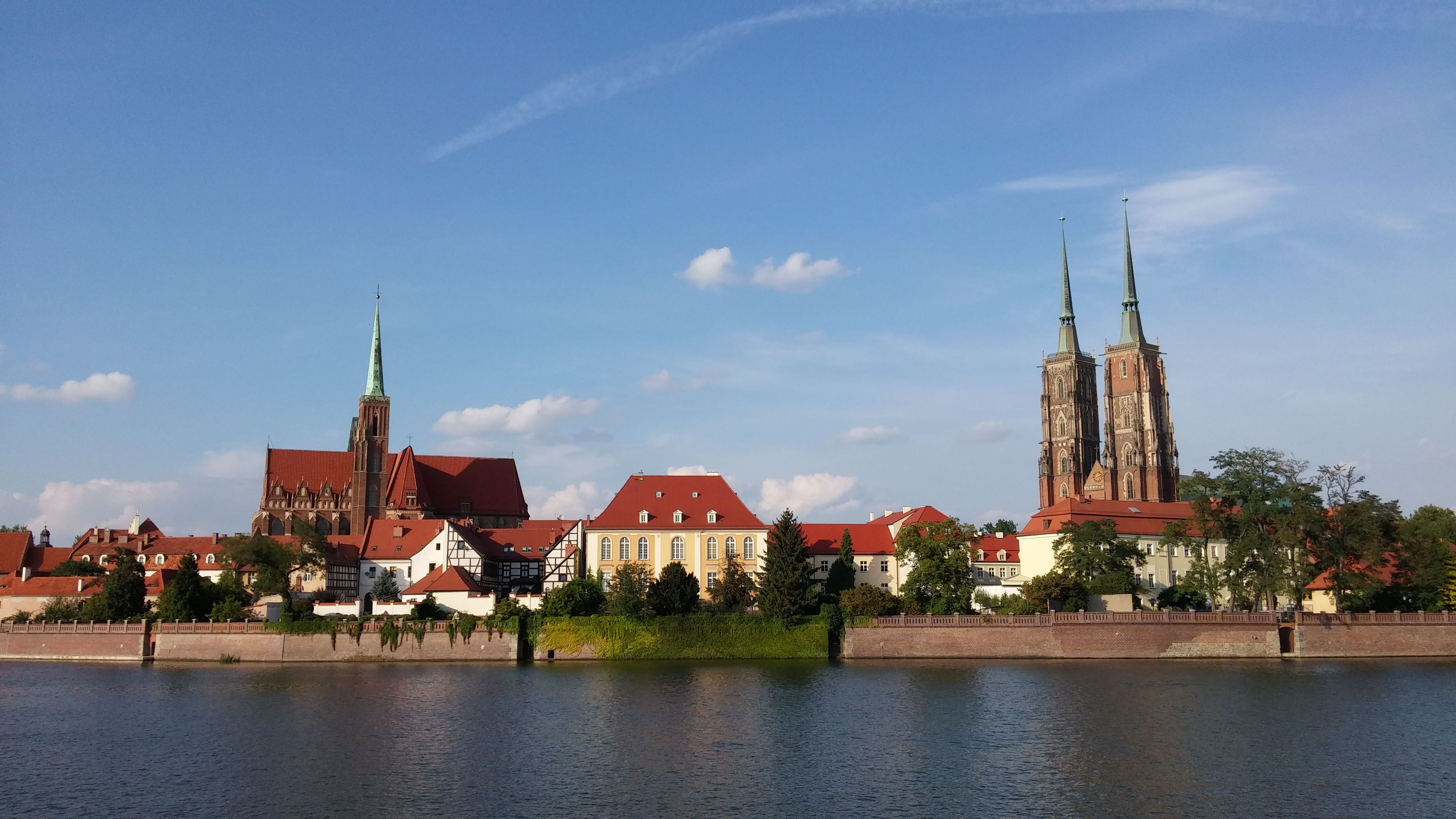

- Location of Downtown within Wrocław
- Country: Poland
- Voivodeship: Lower Silesian
- County/City: Wrocław
- Established: 1952
- Dissolved: 1990

Population (2022)
  - Total: 99,008
- Time zone: UTC+1 (CET)
  - Summer (DST): UTC+2 (CEST)
- Area code: +48 71

Downtown (Polish: Śródmieście, [ɕrudˈmjɛɕt͡ɕɛ]) is a former borough of Wrocław located in the central-eastern part of the city.

On March 21, 1991, the newly created City Office of Wrocław assumed many of the functions previously carried out within the borough. The name, though, remained in use, mainly for statistical and administrative purposes.

== Subdivision ==
Since 1991, Downtown has been divided into 6 districts:

- Nadodrze
- Kleczków
- Ołbin
- Grunwald Square
- Zacisze-Zalesie-Szczytniki
- Biskupin-Sępolno-Dąbie-Bartoszowice

== Parks ==
Downtown has a lot of parks with in its boundaries including Staszica Park, Słowiański Park, Szczytnicki Park or the Park of St. Edith Stein.

== Landmarks ==
Downtown is home to many landmarks including the Ostrów Tumski where the cathedral is located, the Church of St. Micheal the Archangel with its distinctive black spire, the Centennial Hall and nearby Japanese Garden, as well the famous Wrocław Zoo. The district is also where the shopping mall Pasaż Grunwaldzki is located. Wrocław's Botanical garden is also located within Śródmieście.

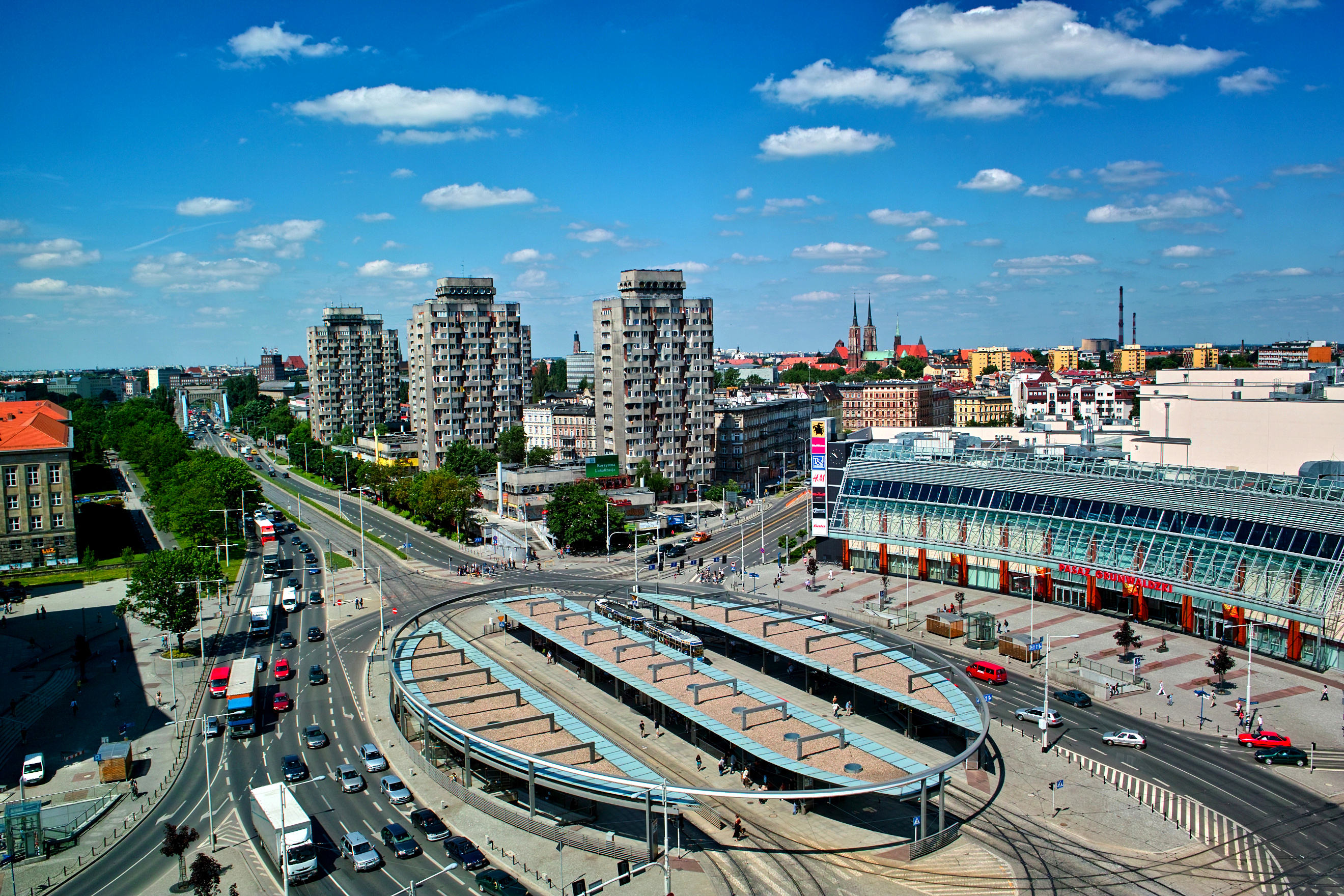
Grunwald Square

== Transport ==
Downtown is bordered by a railway to the north, with the Nadodrze railway station. Within the district there is a major public transport hub in the Grunwald Square, located inside of the Ronald Reagan roundabout.
