= Nadodrze =

District in Wrocław, Poland

- District of Wrocław
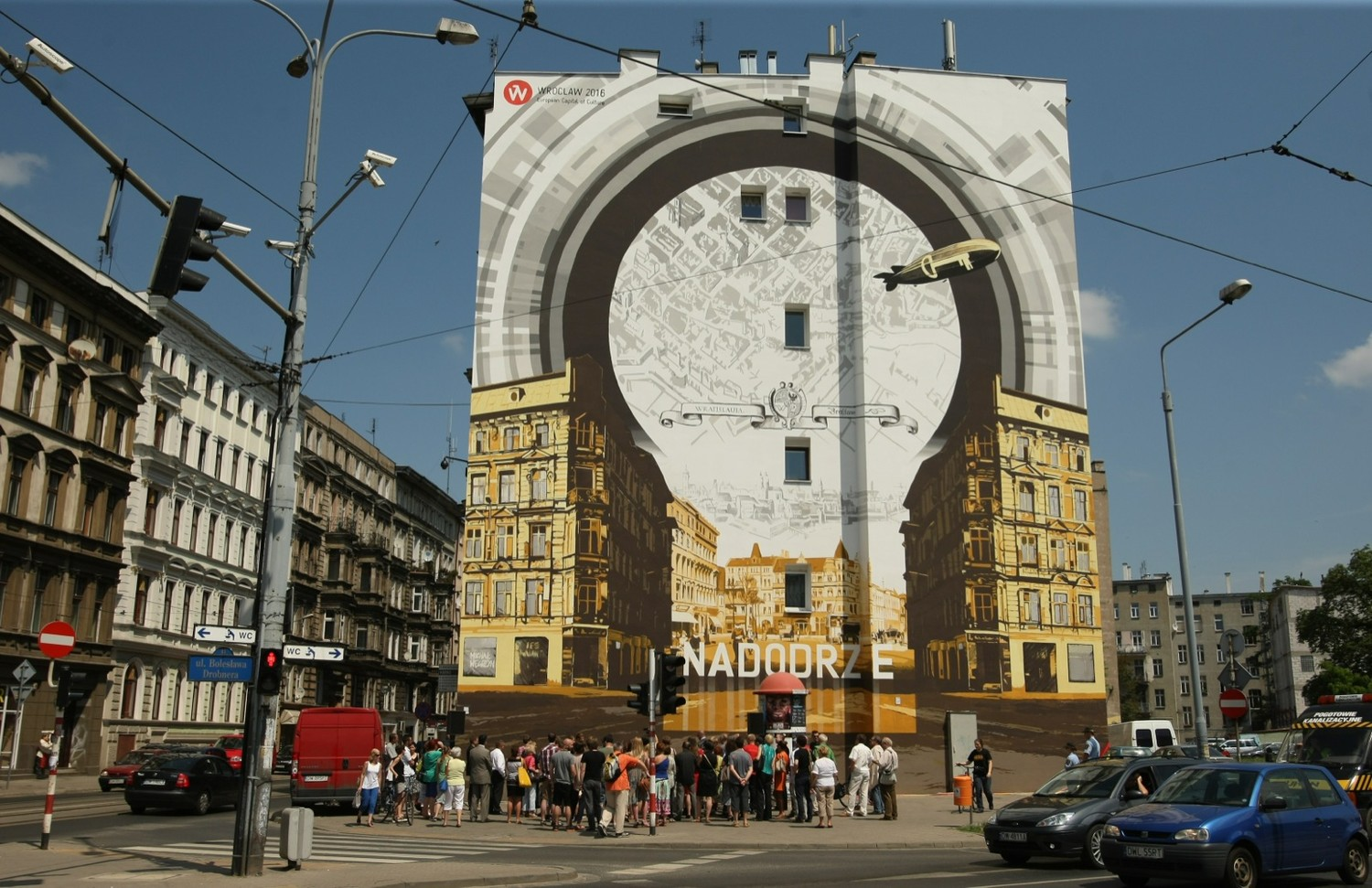
- Nadodrze Gate, Łokietka Street

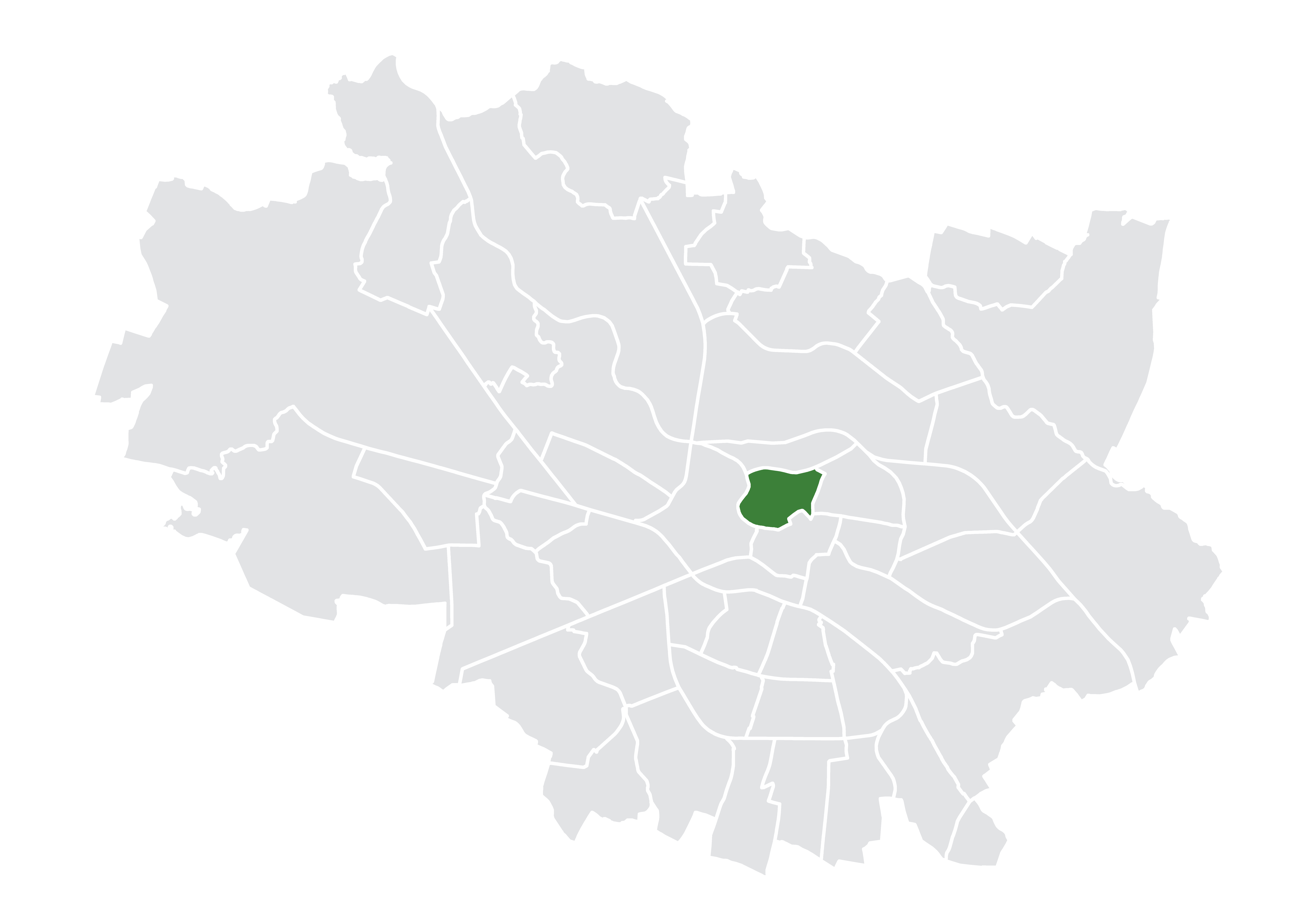
- Location of Nadodrze within Wrocław
- Country: Poland
- Voivodeship: Lower Silesian
- City: Wrocław

Population (2017)
  - Total: 24,828
- Time zone: UTC+1 (CET)
  - Summer (DST): UTC+2 (CEST)

Nadodrze (Polish pronunciation: [nadˈodʐɛ]) is a district in Wrocław, Poland, separated in 1991 from a larger district, Ołbin, which now lies to the east of it. It also borders Kleczków to the north and the Old Town to the west. Nadodrze was incorporated into the city in 1808, after the demolition of the city fortifications.

The neighbourhood was historically a poorer, working class and high crime area of Central Wrocław, but since the beginning of the 21st century it has seen a new wave of residents, been subject to a renovation and gentrification programme, and has become known for its arts scene. It is sometimes compared to Berlin's Kreuzberg or Rome's Trastevere. It currently is known for a notable mix of upper middle class influence, Bohemian life, students and artists whilst still retaining a lot of the areas former character, still being home to a large working class, now ageing population. It is listed as an "area of degradation and renovation" by Wrocław City Council.

== Location ==
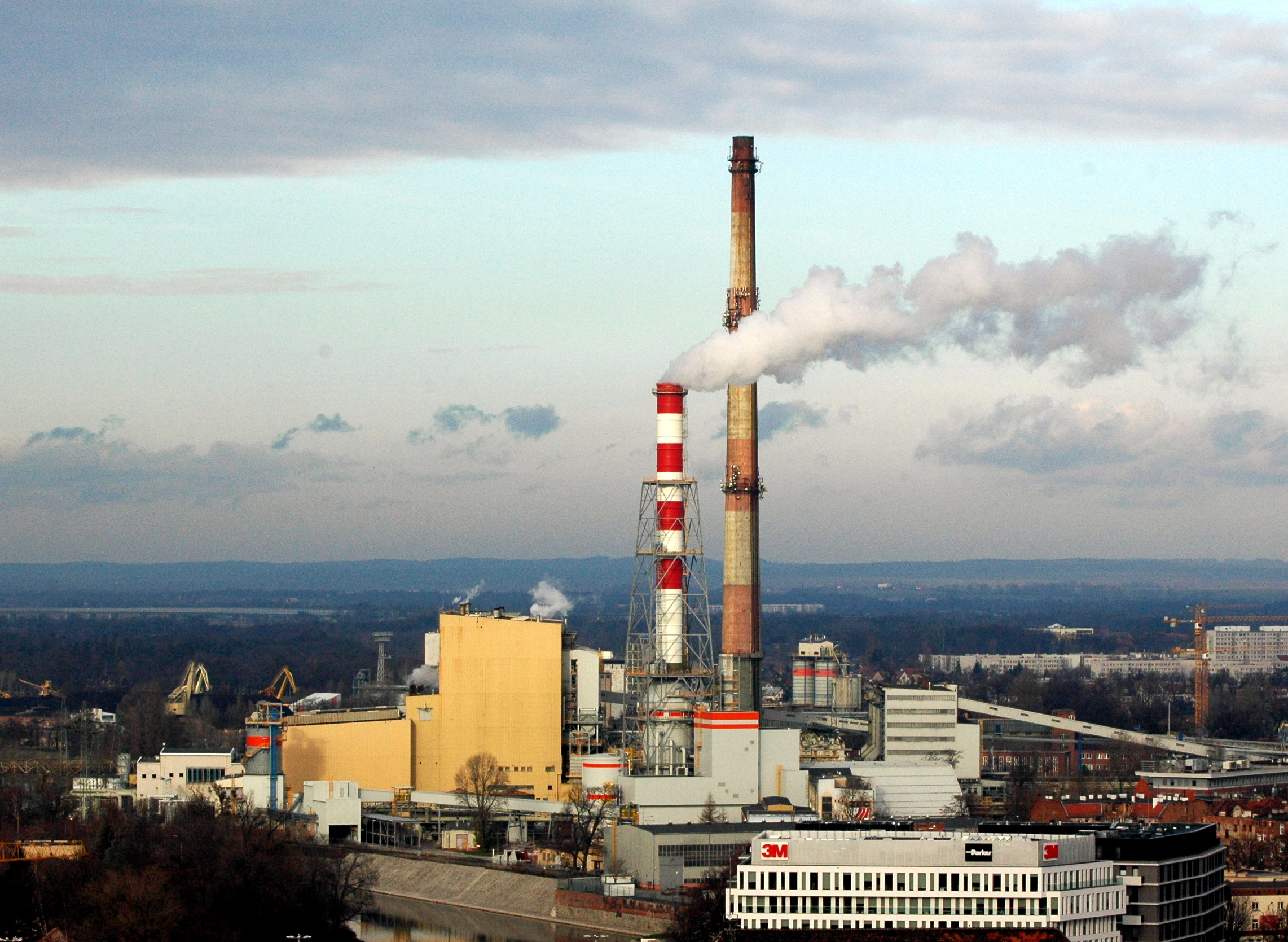
Wrocław combined heat and power plant

Within the boundaries of Nadodrze, there is Kępa Mieszczańska island, and important objects of urban infrastructure: Wrocław Nadodrze train station, tram depot No. 2 at Słowiańska Street, and Wrocław Combined Heat and Power Plant. The seat of the Nadodrze Housing Estate Council is located at 43 Rydygiera St. In 2017, about 25 thousand people lived within the boundaries of Nadodrze. The district is one of the most densely populated areas in Wroclaw.

== History and development ==
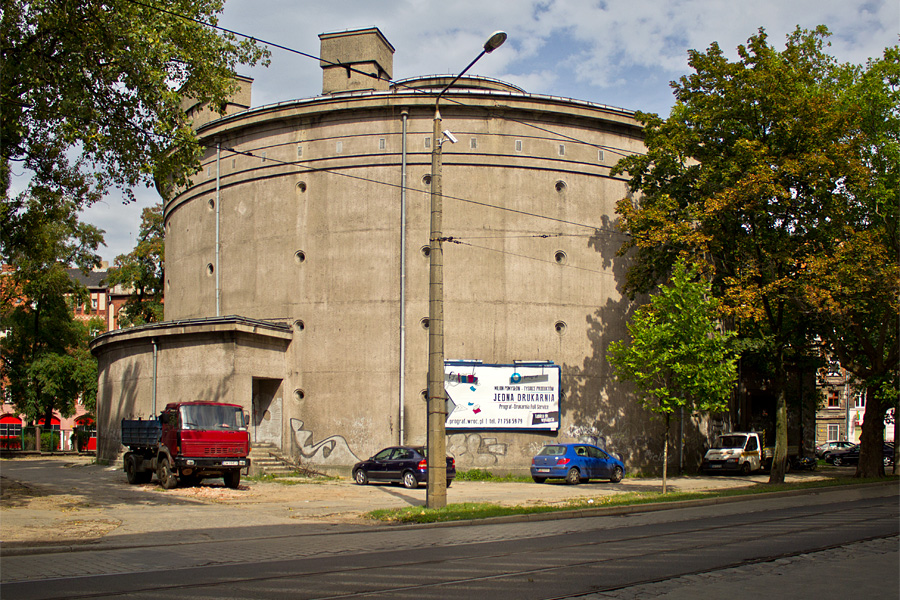
WWII air-raid shelter at Ołbińska Street

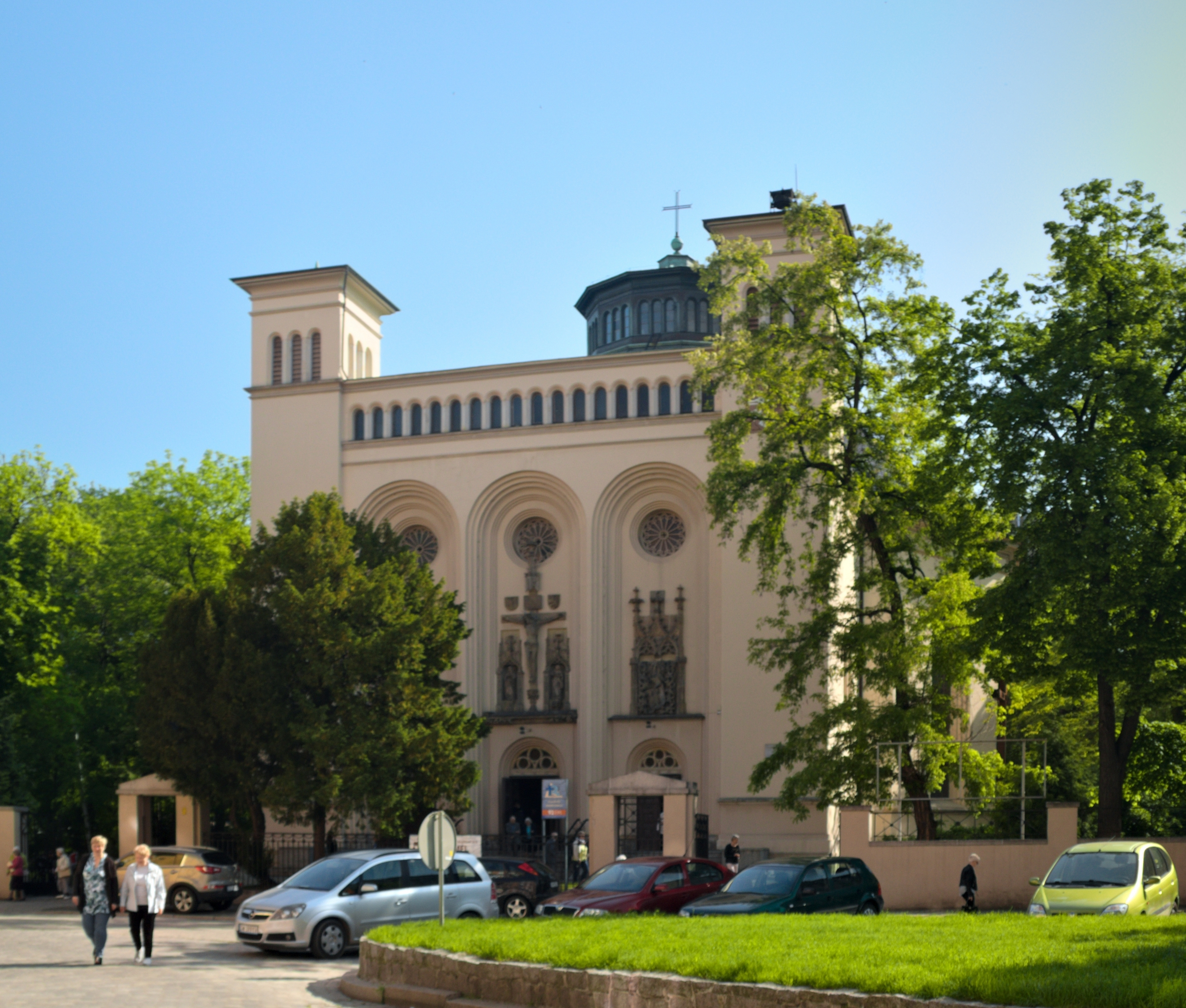
Saint Joseph Church

Nadodrze is known both for its historical kamienice and for its industrial development. Soon after World War II and the transfer of the city to Poland, the demographic composition of the population changed. Richer residents began to settle elsewhere, leading to a gradual decline, an increase in poverty and crime, and infrastructural decay.

The revitalisation of Nadodrze began only in 2005, and soon the neighborhood became the "symbol of Wrocław's revitalisation". Dozens of historic houses, two main squares, schools, parks, and public spaces were renovated. Revitalisation was also accompanied by the mass privatisation of public housing stock. Some researchers saw in the revitalisation process a threat of gentrification. The city's programme was criticised because it concentrated on cosmetic changes rather than attempts to improve the quality of life of the neighbourhood's residents. The redevelopment of Nadodrze has made the former chiefly working class area somewhat privileged, however, this is limited to certain parts of Nadodrze and is not universal. A good example of this is Kępa Mieszczańska, an island on the Oder that is administratively a part of the district of Nadodrze, however, is very separate both culturally and class wise with the rest of Nadodrze, being an upper class, upscale inner city neighbourhood.

The Łokietka 5 – Infopunkt Nadodrze is a centre for supporting activities for the redevelopment of Nadodrze. It deals with cultural initiatives, coordinates inhabitants and local authorities, and brings together various communities functioning in Nadodrze.

One of the new tourist attractions of Nadodrze is colourful courtyards at 14–16 Roosvelta Street. The work (niemural), which is a combination of ceramics, painting, and sculpture, is a joint effort of local residents in cooperation with Wroclaw artists and students of the Academy of Fine Arts. It is 250 meters long and covers an area of 1200 square meters. The neighbourhood is also famous for its numerous cafes, stores, and art galleries.

The area is home to people of diverse social class backgrounds, ethnic and cultural minorities and institutions.

In 2014, Nadodrze's Kurkowa Street was used for filming of the Steven Spielberg film Bridge of Spies, a Cold War-era spy thriller. Working alongside the Wrocław Film Commission, the film's producers set the street up to resemble Berlin in the 1950s and 1960s.

== Gallery ==
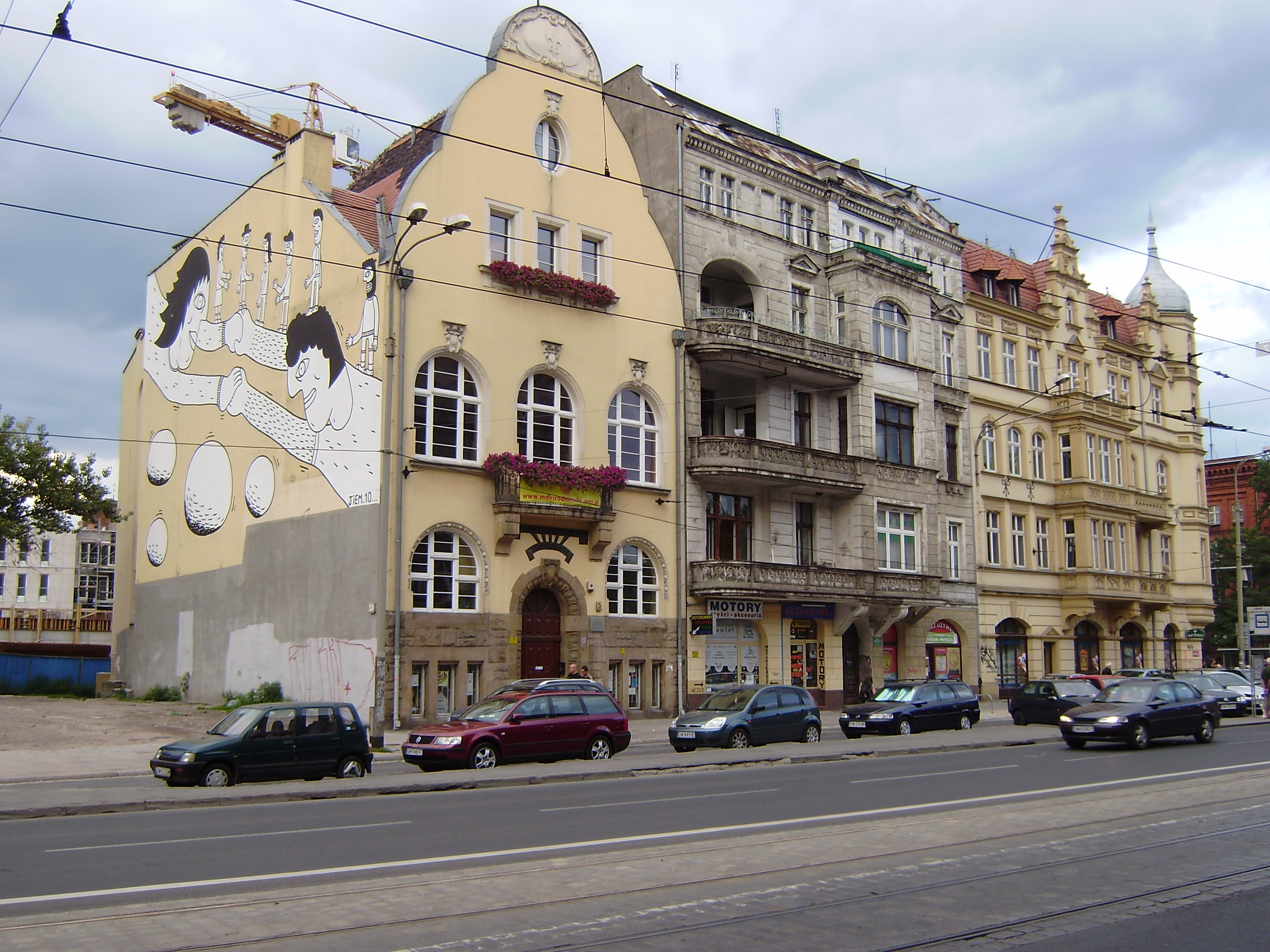
Street art between Dubois and Pomorska streets

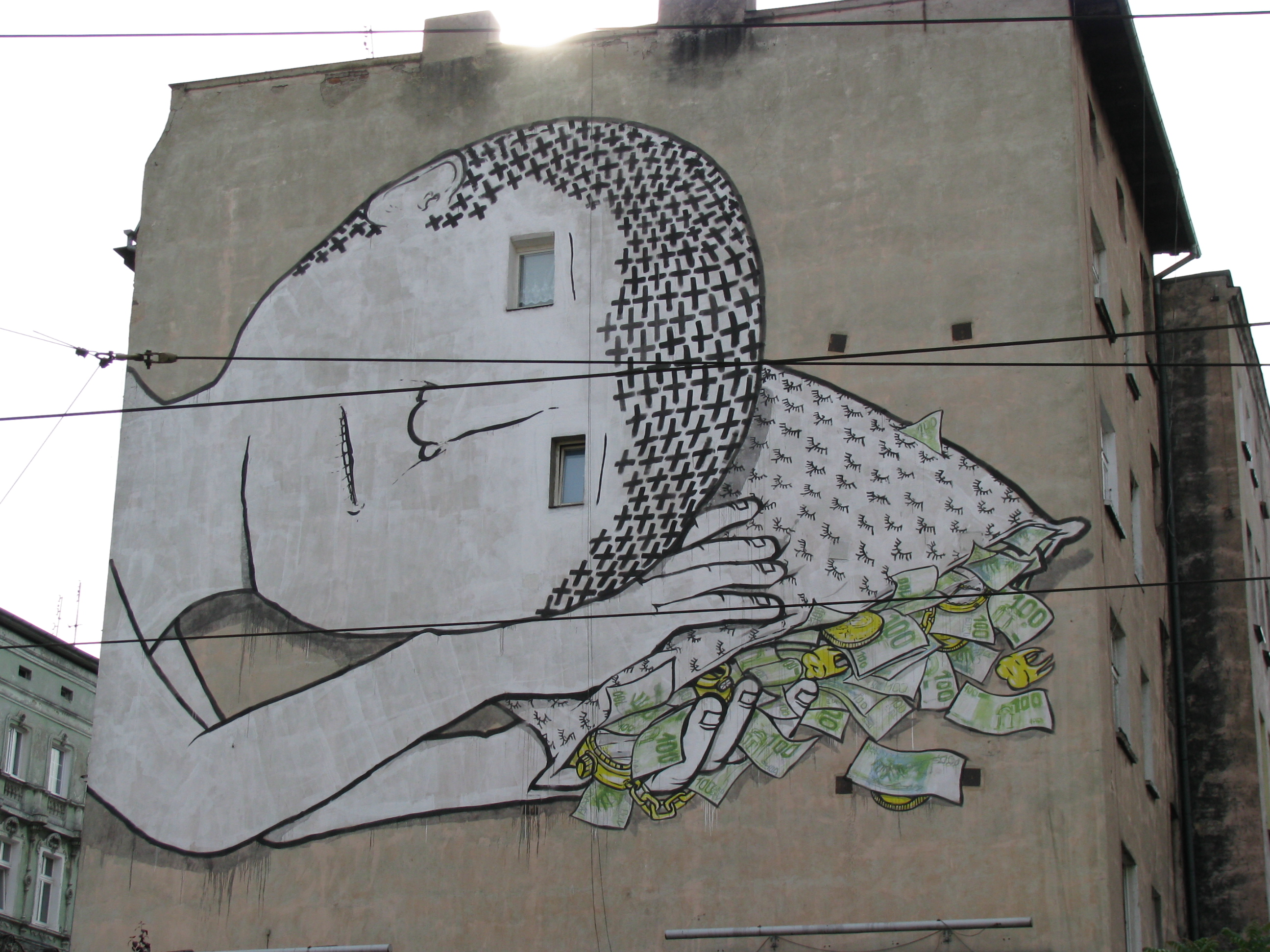
Mural by Blu, Pomorska Street

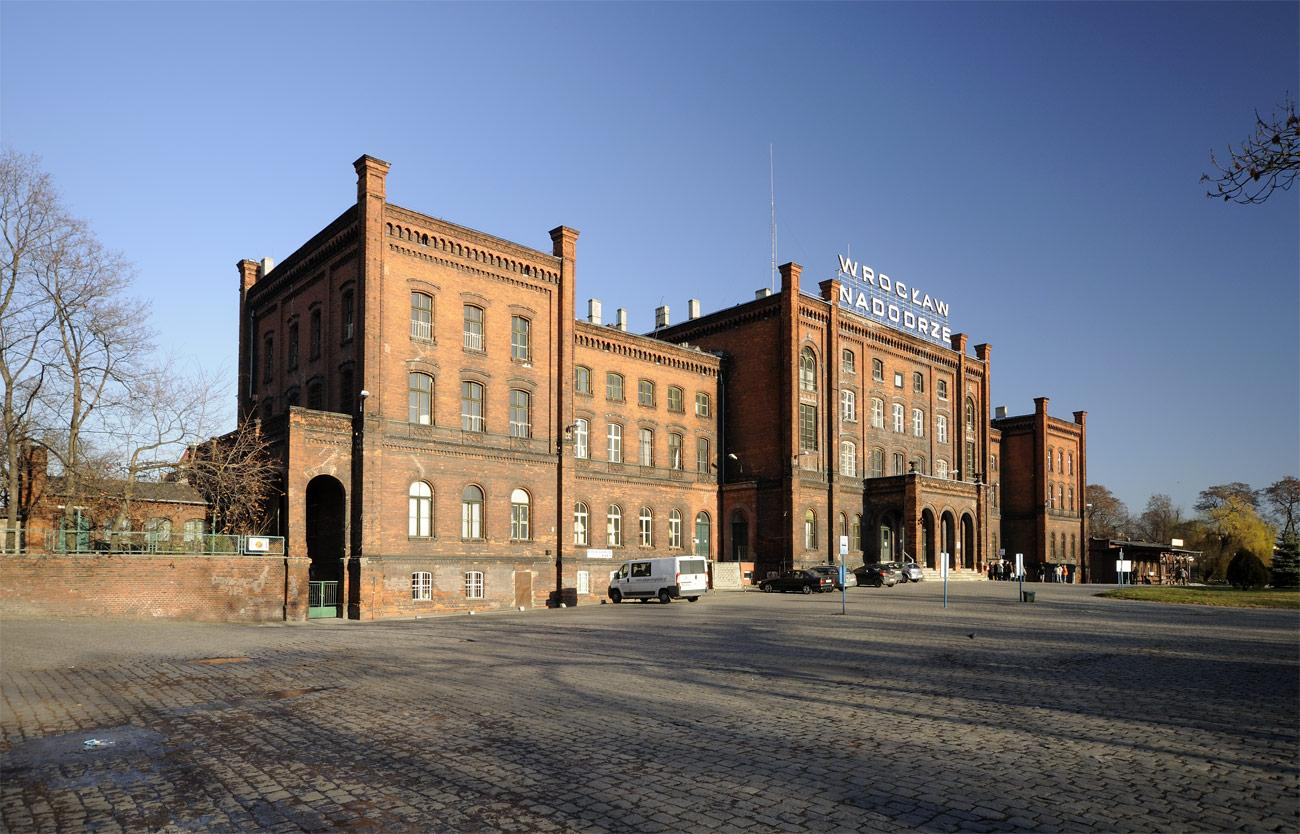
Wrocław Nadodrze train station

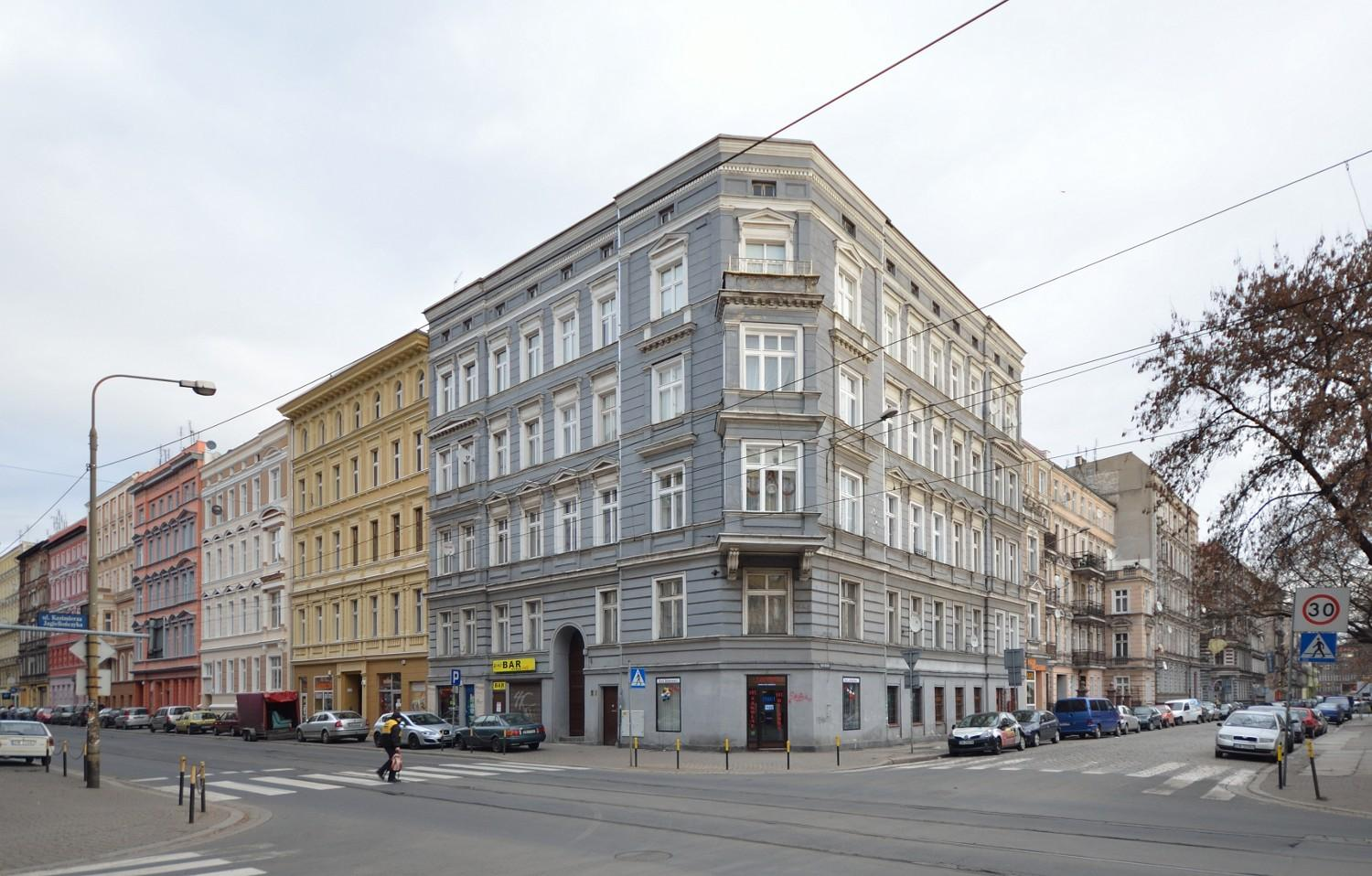
Crossroad of Chrobrego and Jagiellończyka streets

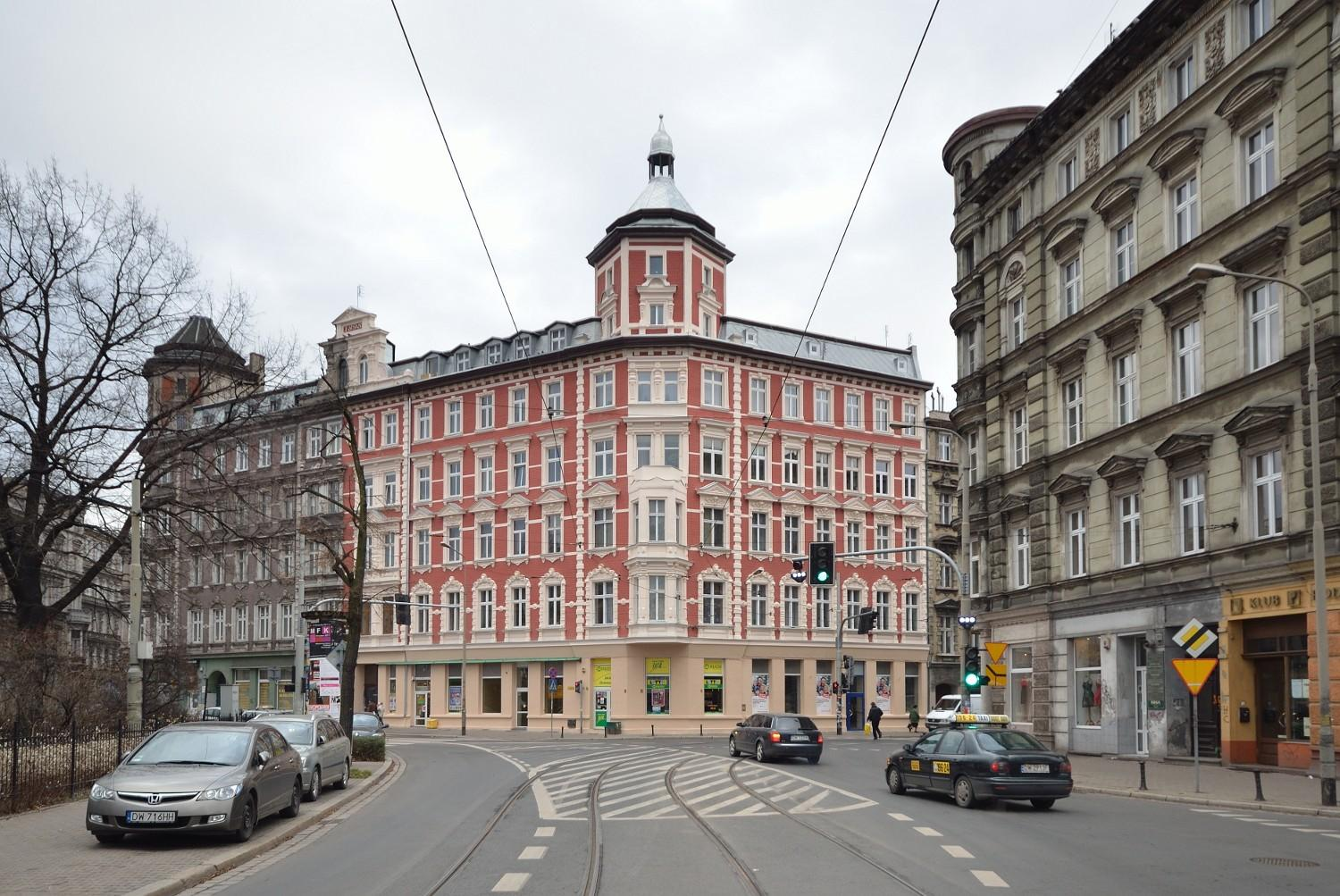
Świętego Macieja Street

Kurkowa Street was a shooting location for Bridge of Spies

== Famous people ==
- Anna German, Polish singer

== See also ==
- Gentrification
