= Kleczków =

District in Wrocław, Poland

- District of Wrocław
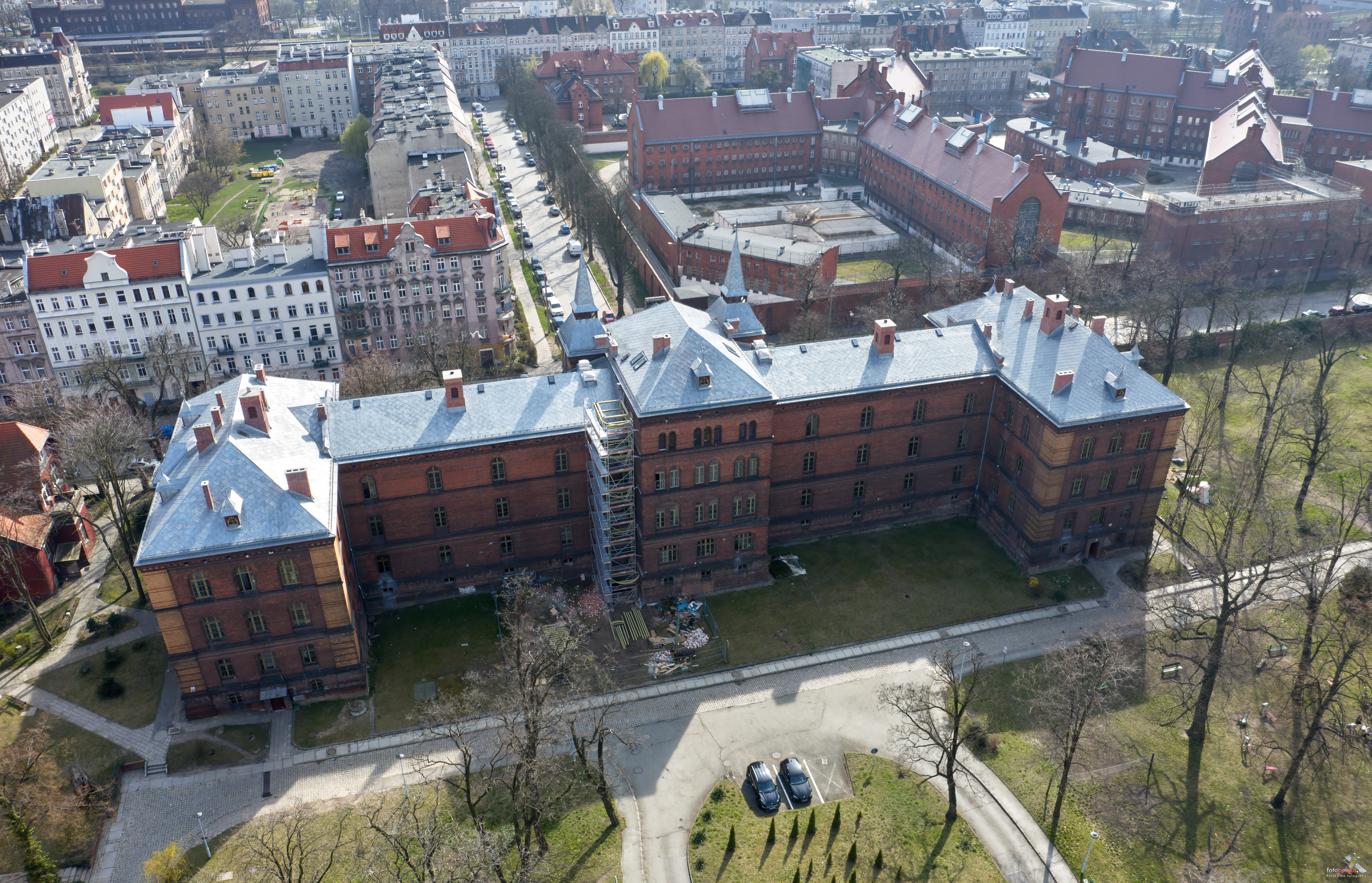
- Lower Silesian Center for Mental Health

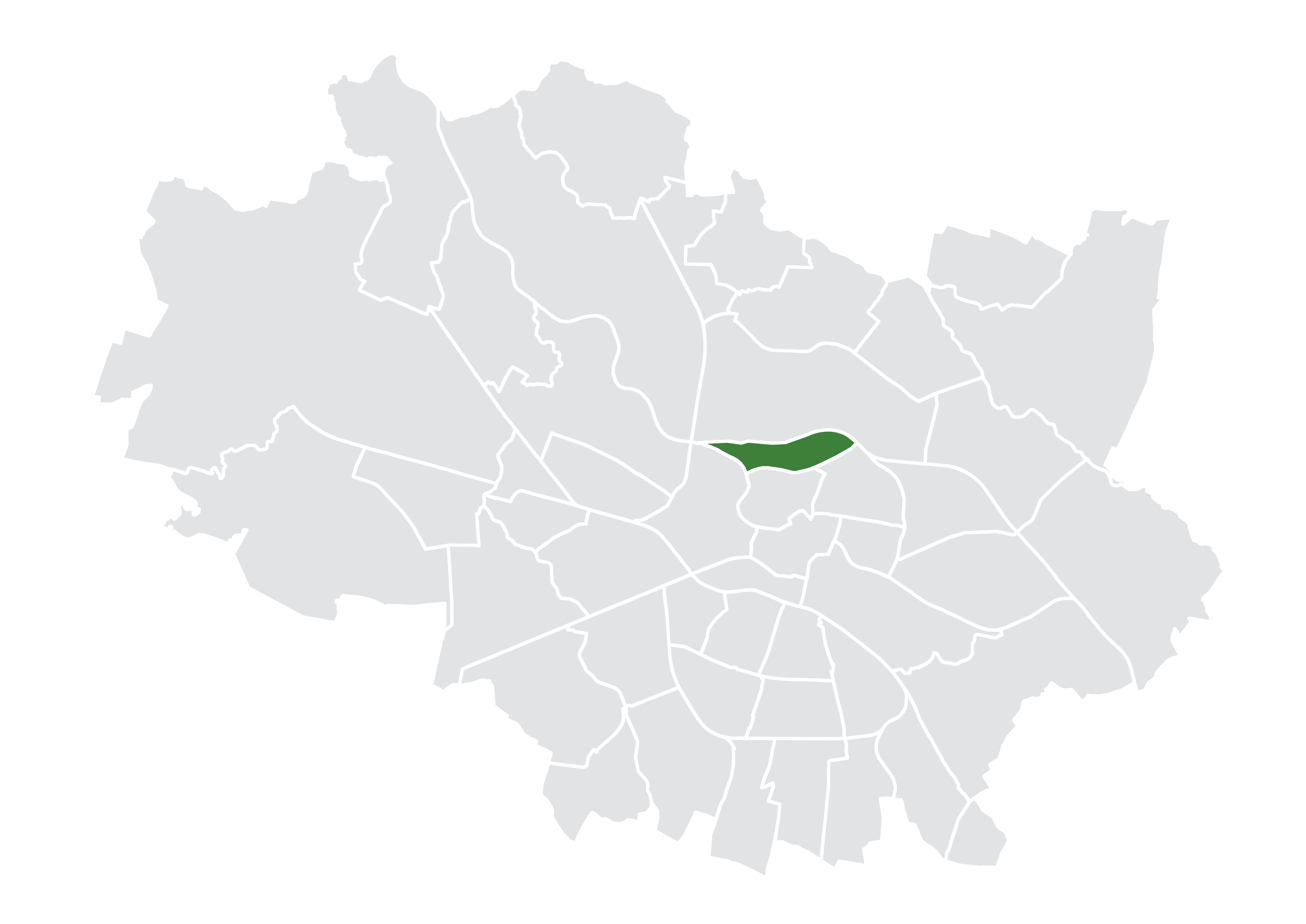
- Location of Kleczków within Wrocław
- Country: Poland
- Voivodeship: Lower Silesian
- County/City: Wrocław
- Incorporated into the city: 1808
- Established the modern-day district: 1991

Population (2022)
  - Total: 7,418
- Time zone: UTC+1 (CET)
  - Summer (DST): UTC+2 (CEST)
- Area code: +48 71

Kleczków (Polish pronunciation: [ˈklɛt͡ʂkuf], German: Kletschkau, [ˈklɛt͡ʃkaʊ]) is a district in Wrocław, Poland, located in the north-central part of the city. It was established in the territory of the former Downtown district.

== History ==
The name is thought to derive from the old Polish word 'kleczki', which meant the bells on the necks of grazing cattle.

The Klein Kletschkau settlement was located on the right bank of the Oder until 1794. Later, the northern border was marked by the main stream of the river as a result of the regulation of the old Oder River. The border with Nadodrze to the south was formed by the railroad to Oleśnica.

Initially a village, the settlement was incorporated into Breslau (today's Wrocław) in 1808.

Due to incorrectly transcribed pre-war documents, the district's name was changed to Klęczków after the war. This name was still visible on street signs until the 1980s.

In 1991, after reforms in the administrative division of Wrocław, Kleczków became one of the city's 48 districts.
