= Biskupin-Sępolno-Dąbie-Bartoszowice =

District in Wrocław, Poland

- District of Wrocław
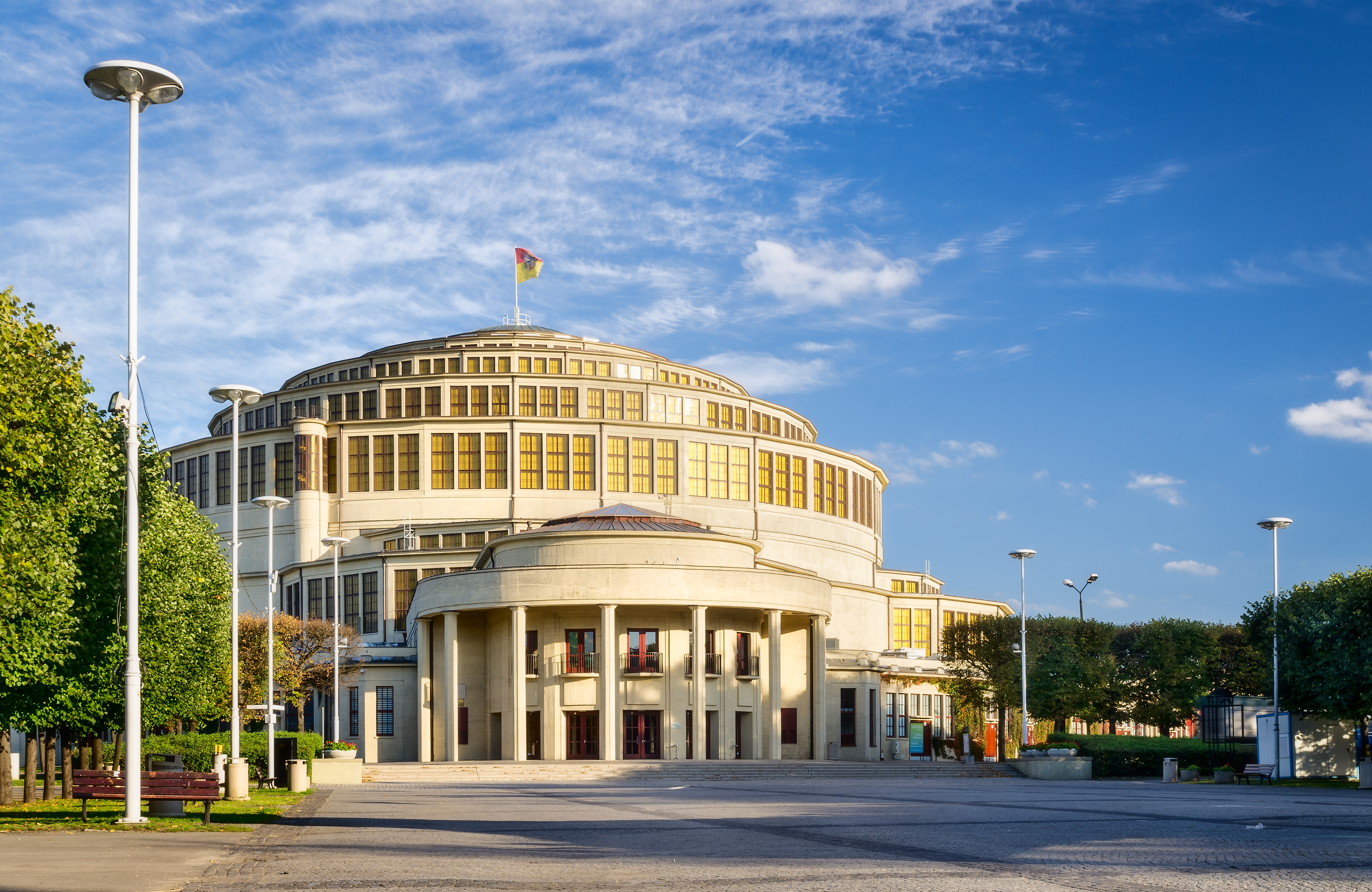
- The Centennial Hall, located in the district

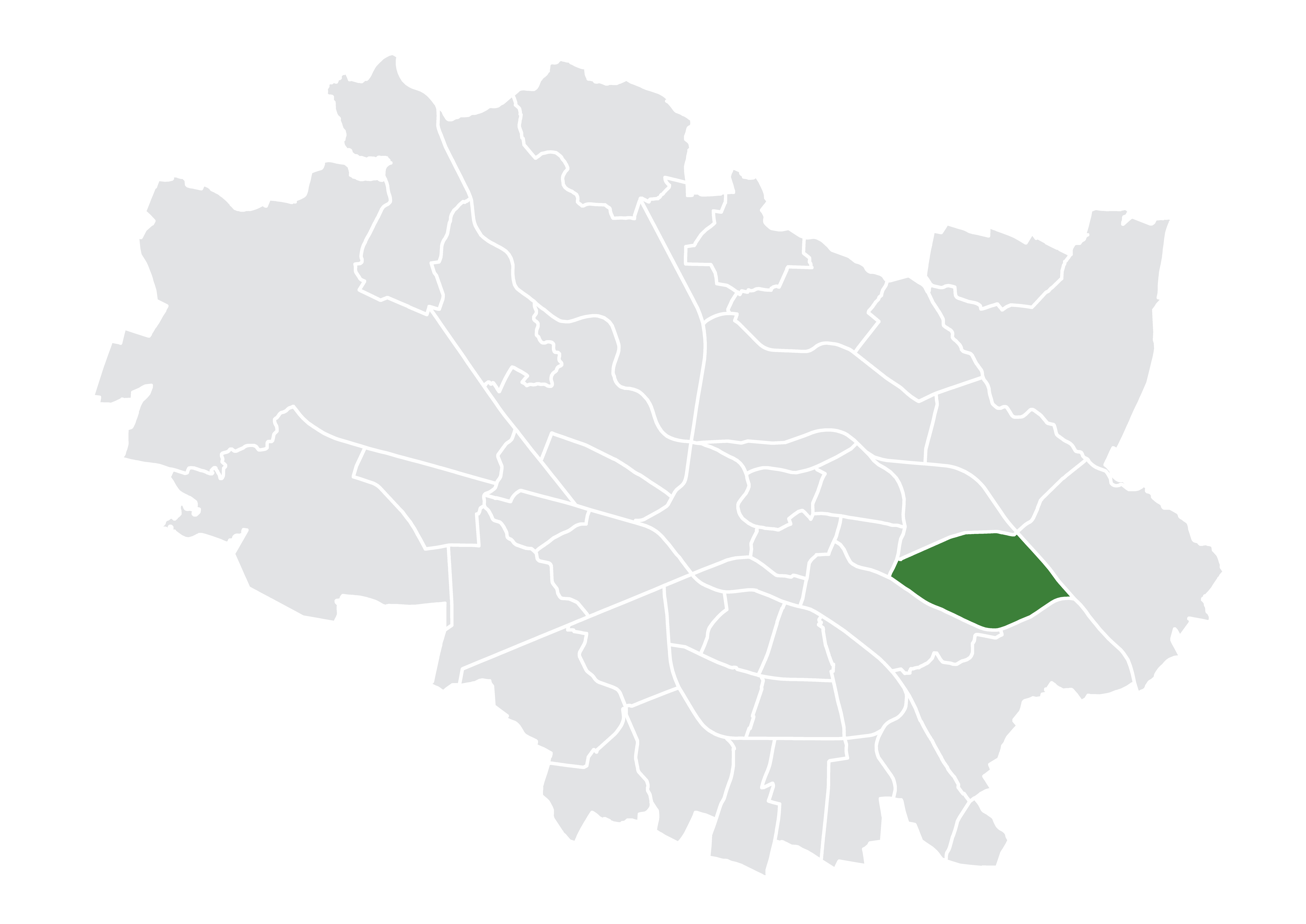
- Location of the district within Wrocław
- Country: Poland
- Voivodeship: Lower Silesian
- County/City: Wrocław
- Established: 1991

Population (2022)
  - Total: 19,951
- Time zone: UTC+1 (CET)
  - Summer (DST): UTC+2 (CEST)
- Area code: +48 71

Biskupin-Sępolno-Dąbie-Bartoszowice (Polish pronunciation: [bisˈkupin sɛmˈpɔlnɔ ˈdɔmbjɛ bartɔʂɔˈvit͡sɛ]) is a district of Wrocław located in the eastern part of the city. It was established in the territory of the former Downtown district in 1991.

The district encompasses the area of four former villages incorporated to the city on April 1, 1928 – Bischofswalde (Biskupin), Zimpel (Sępolno), Grüneiche (Dąbie) and Bartheln (Bartoszowice). It also includes the areas of Zimpel annexed to Breslau (today's Wrocław) in 1924, a part of the former village of Scheitnig located within the city limits since 1868, and the Opatowice Island, which in the former administrative division of the city belonged to the Krzyki district.

The district is home to the city zoo and Wrocław's only UNESCO-listed landmark, the Centennial Hall. It also houses the oldest oak tree in the city, Dziadek ('Grandpa'), which scientists estimate to be 440 years old.
