= Zacisze-Zalesie-Szczytniki =

District in Wrocław, Poland

- District of Wrocław
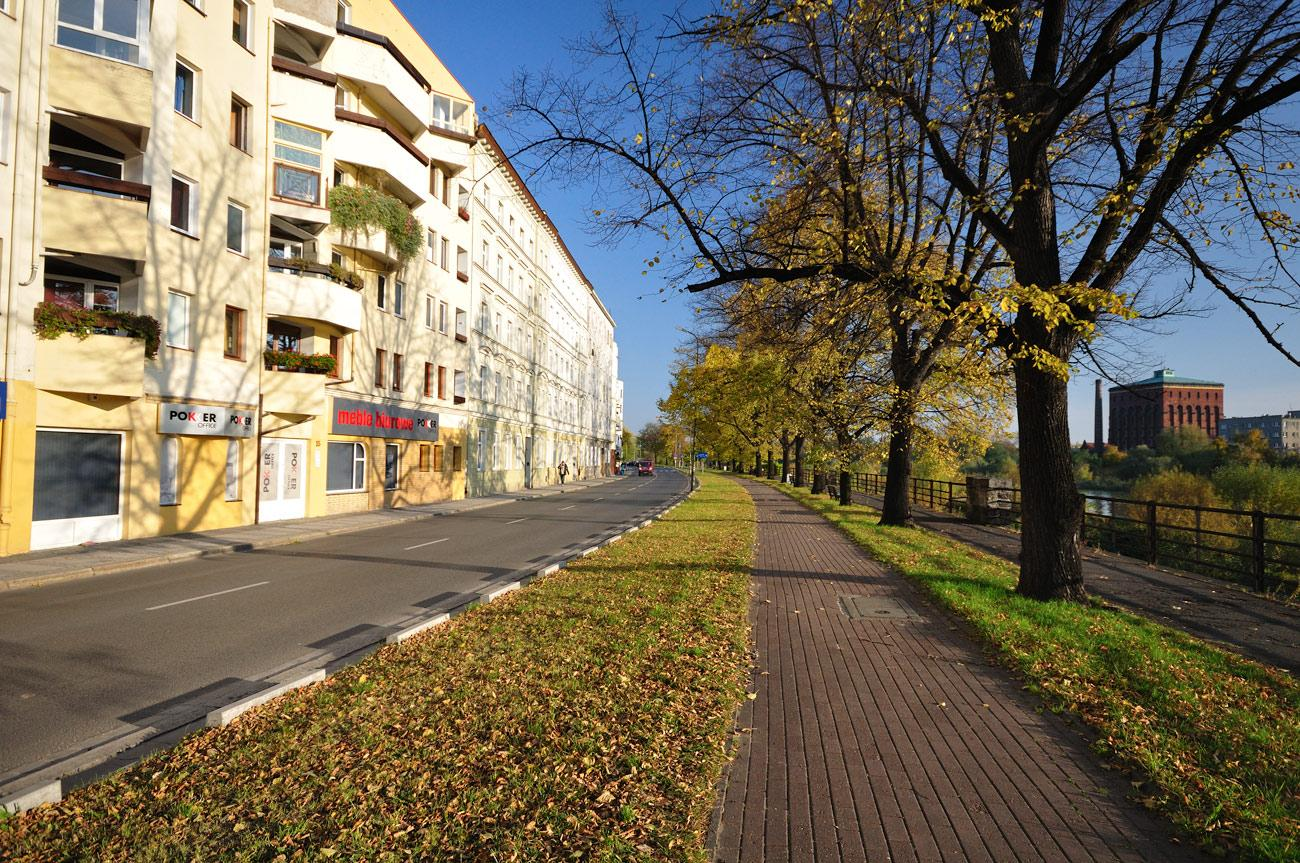

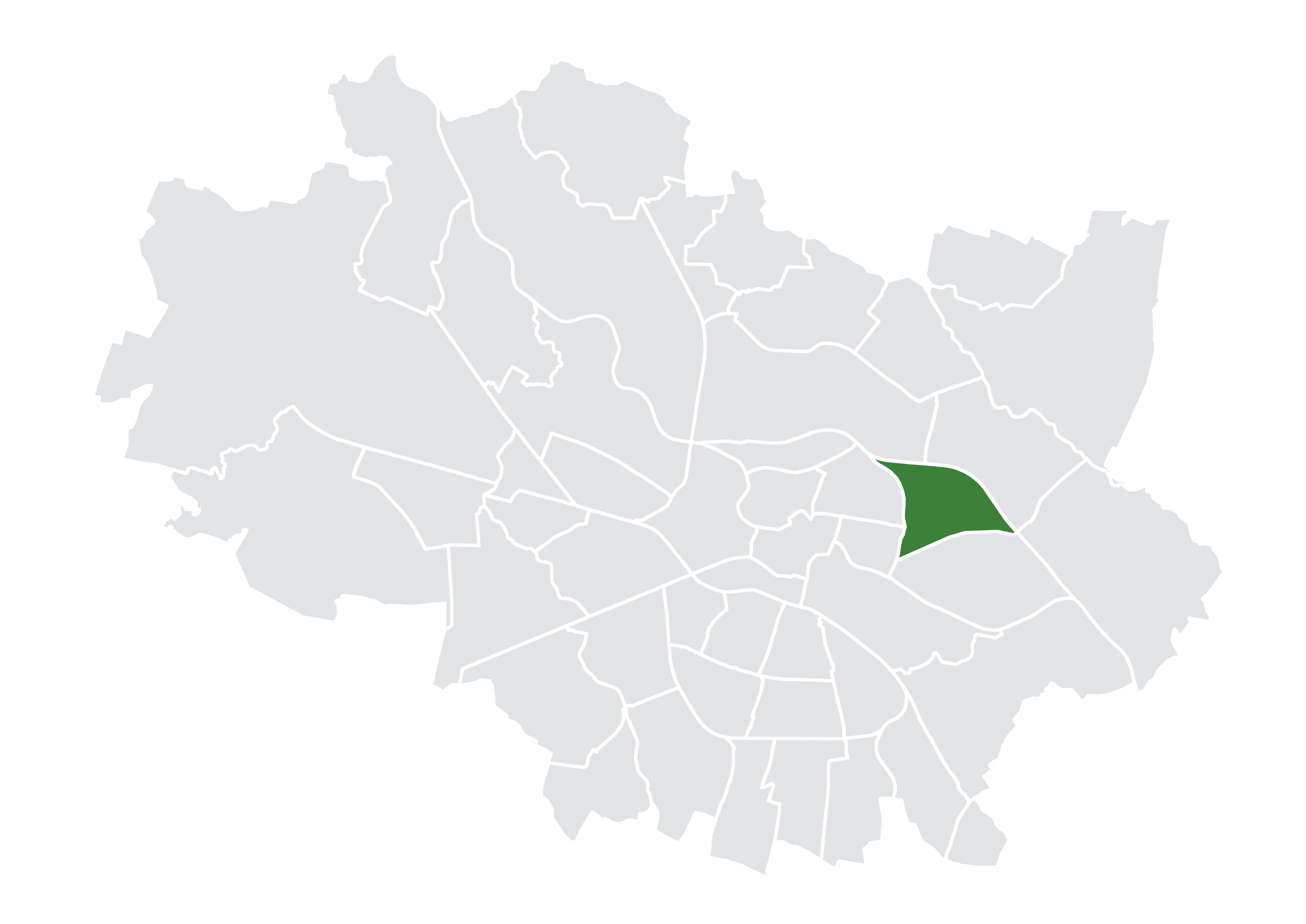
- Location of the district within Wrocław
- Country: Poland
- Voivodeship: Lower Silesian
- County/City: Wrocław
- Established: 1991

Population (2022)
  - Total: 4,059
- Time zone: UTC+1 (CET)
  - Summer (DST): UTC+2 (CEST)
- Area code: +48 71
- Website: ro-zzs.pl

Zacisze-Zalesie-Szczytniki (Polish pronunciation: [zaˈt͡ɕiʂɛ zaˈlɛɕɛ ʂt͡ʂɨtˈɲiki]) is a district in Wrocław, Poland, located in the northern part of the city. It was established in the territory of the former Downtown district.

The district consists of the neighborhoods of Szczytniki, Zacisze, and Zalesie.

In 1991, after reforms in the administrative division of Wrocław, Zacisze-Zalesie-Szczytniki became one of the city's 48 districts.

The Szczytnicki Park, one of the largest city parks in Wrocław, and the Olympic Stadium, home venue of Sparta Wrocław motorcycle speedway and Panthers Wrocław American football teams, are located in the district.
