= Jerzmanowo-Jarnołtów-Strachowice-Osiniec =

District in Wrocław, Poland

- District of Wrocław
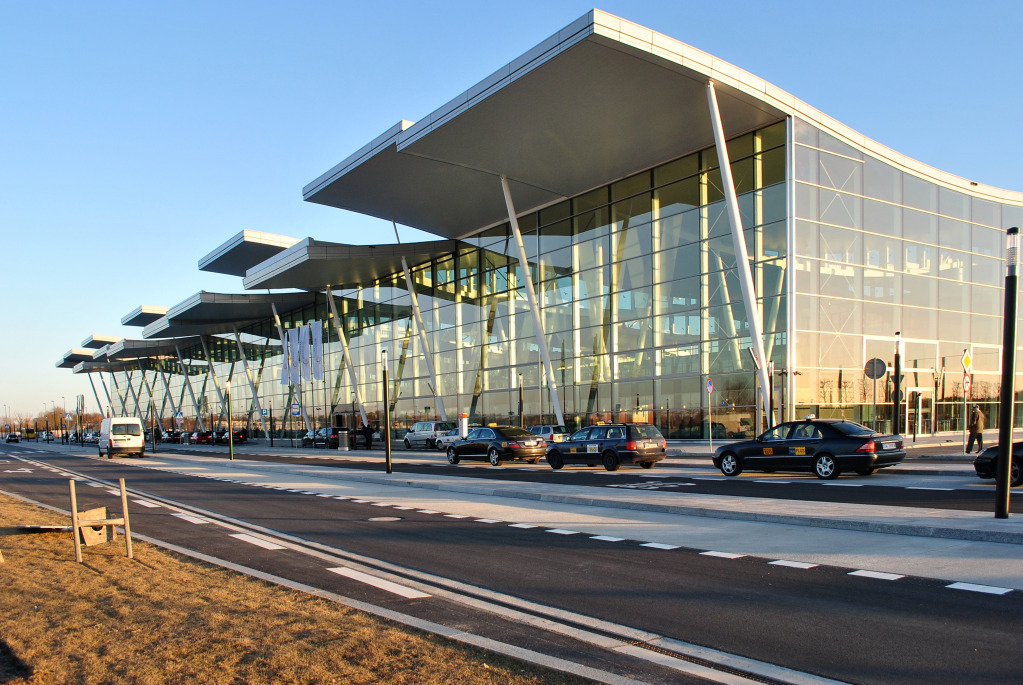

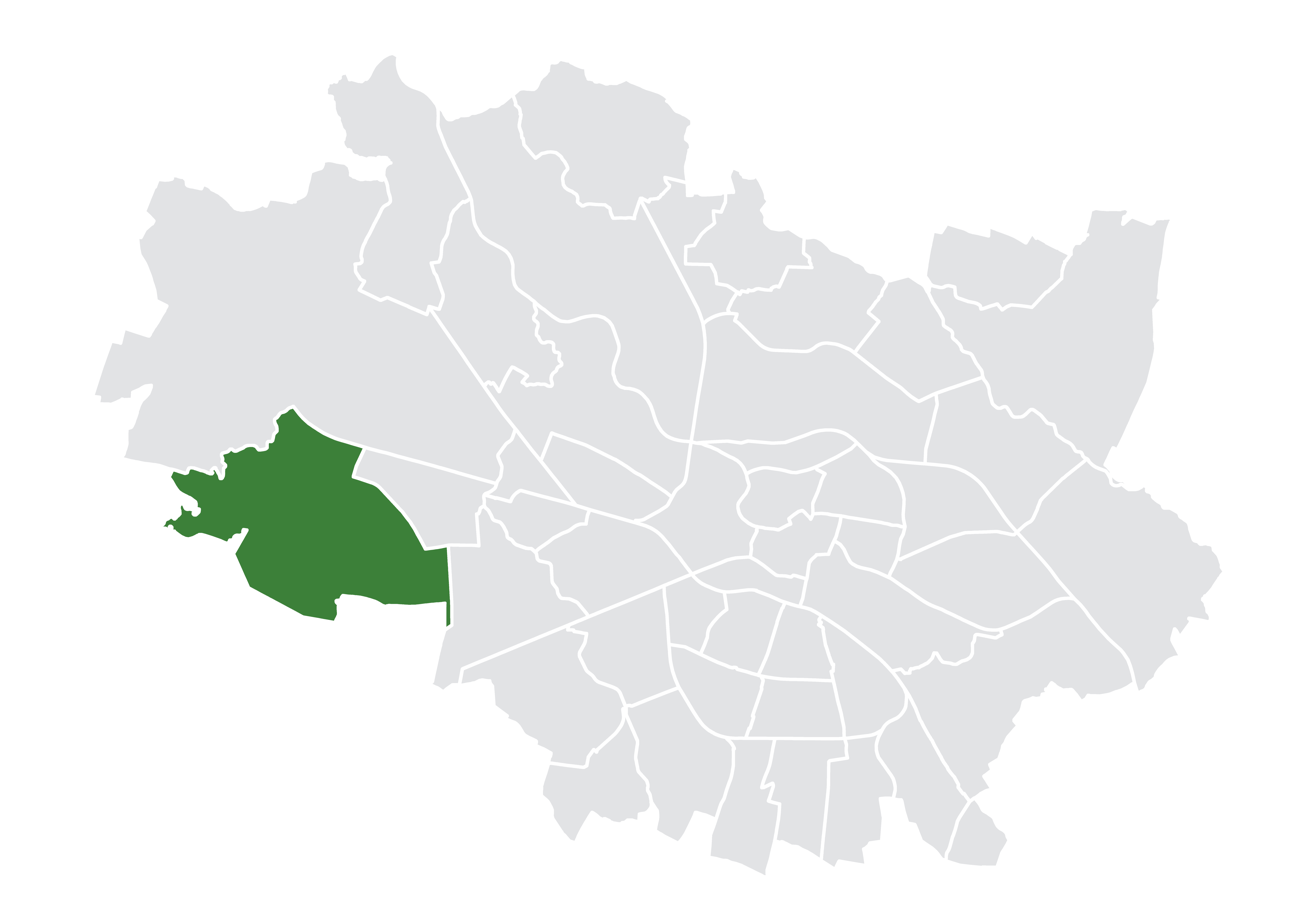
- Location of the district within Wrocław
- Country: Poland
- Voivodeship: Lower Silesian
- County/City: Wrocław
- Established: 1991

Population (2022)
  - Total: 2,202
- Time zone: UTC+1 (CET)
  - Summer (DST): UTC+2 (CEST)
- Area code: +48 71
- Website: Osiedle Jerzmanowo-Jarnołtów-Strachowice-Osiniec

Jerzmanowo-Jarnołtów-Strachowice-Osiniec (Polish pronunciation: [jɛʐmaˈnɔvɔ jarˈnɔwtuf straxɔˈvit͡sɛ ɔˈɕiɲɛt͡s]) is a district in Wrocław located in the western part of the city. It was established in the territory of the former Fabryczna district.

== Background ==
The district includes the area of four former villages incorporated to the city on January 1, 1973, that is Jerzmanowo (German: Herrmannsdorf), Jarnołtów (German: Arnoldsmühle), Strachowice (German: Strachwitz), and Osinec (German: Kaltasche). Its neighboring districts are Leśnica, Żerniki and Muchobór Wielki.

In 1991, after reforms in the administrative division of Wrocław, it became one of the city's 48 districts. From 1991 until 1997, the settlement was called Jerzmanowo-Jarnołtów-Strachowice.

The district is the location of Wrocław Airport.

== History ==
=== Strachowice ===
Strachowice dates back to medieval Piast-ruled Poland. The oldest known mention of the village comes from a document from 1305. Its name is of Polish origin, and comes from the Polish word 'strach' ('fear').

In 1937, during a massive Nazi campaign of renaming of placenames, it was renamed to Schöngarten to erase traces of Polish origin. During World War II, the German Nazi government operated the E182 forced labor subcamp of the Stalag VIII-B/344 prisoner-of-war camp in the settlement. Following the defeat of Germany in the war, in 1945, the village became again part of Poland and its historic name was restored.

In 1973, Strachowice was included in the city limits of Wrocław. Until 1990 it was a neighborhood (osiedle) in the south-western part of Wrocław, in the district of Fabryczna. Since 1991, it has been a part of the district.

== Climate ==
Climate data for Wrocław (Copernicus Airport Wrocław), elevation: 120 m, 1961-1990 normals and extremes
Month	Jan	Feb	Mar	Apr	May	Jun	Jul	Aug	Sep	Oct	Nov	Dec	Year
Record high °C (°F)	14.9 (58.8)	19.7 (67.5)	25.2 (77.4)	29.5 (85.1)	31.0 (87.8)	32.8 (91.0)	36.2 (97.2)	35.0 (95.0)	31.8 (89.2)	28.1 (82.6)	20.6 (69.1)	16.4 (61.5)	36.2 (97.2)
Mean daily maximum °C (°F)	1.3 (34.3)	3.2 (37.8)	7.9 (46.2)	13.6 (56.5)	18.8 (65.8)	22.0 (71.6)	23.4 (74.1)	23.2 (73.8)	19.3 (66.7)	14.1 (57.4)	7.4 (45.3)	3.0 (37.4)	13.1 (55.6)
Daily mean °C (°F)	−1.8 (28.8)	−0.5 (31.1)	3.2 (37.8)	8.0 (46.4)	13.1 (55.6)	16.5 (61.7)	17.7 (63.9)	17.2 (63.0)	13.4 (56.1)	8.9 (48.0)	3.9 (39.0)	0.2 (32.4)	8.3 (47.0)
Mean daily minimum °C (°F)	−5.3 (22.5)	−4.0 (24.8)	−0.9 (30.4)	2.8 (37.0)	7.1 (44.8)	10.7 (51.3)	12.0 (53.6)	11.6 (52.9)	8.7 (47.7)	4.6 (40.3)	0.6 (33.1)	−3.1 (26.4)	3.7 (38.7)
Record low °C (°F)	−30.0 (−22.0)	−27.0 (−16.6)	−23.8 (−10.8)	−8.1 (17.4)	−4.0 (24.8)	0.2 (32.4)	3.6 (38.5)	2.1 (35.8)	−3.0 (26.6)	−7.6 (18.3)	−18.2 (−0.8)	−24.4 (−11.9)	−30.0 (−22.0)
Average precipitation mm (inches)	28 (1.1)	26 (1.0)	26 (1.0)	39 (1.5)	64 (2.5)	80 (3.1)	84 (3.3)	78 (3.1)	48 (1.9)	40 (1.6)	43 (1.7)	34 (1.3)	590 (23.1)
Average precipitation days (≥ 1.0 mm)	7.3	6.6	7.2	7.7	9.6	10.0	9.7	8.4	7.9	7.1	9.2	8.6	99.3
Mean monthly sunshine hours	49.0	65.0	107.0	142.0	198.0	194.0	205.0	197.0	139.0	108.0	52.0	39.0	1,495
Source: NOAA
