= Gądów-Popowice Południowe =

District in Wrocław, Poland

- District of Wrocław
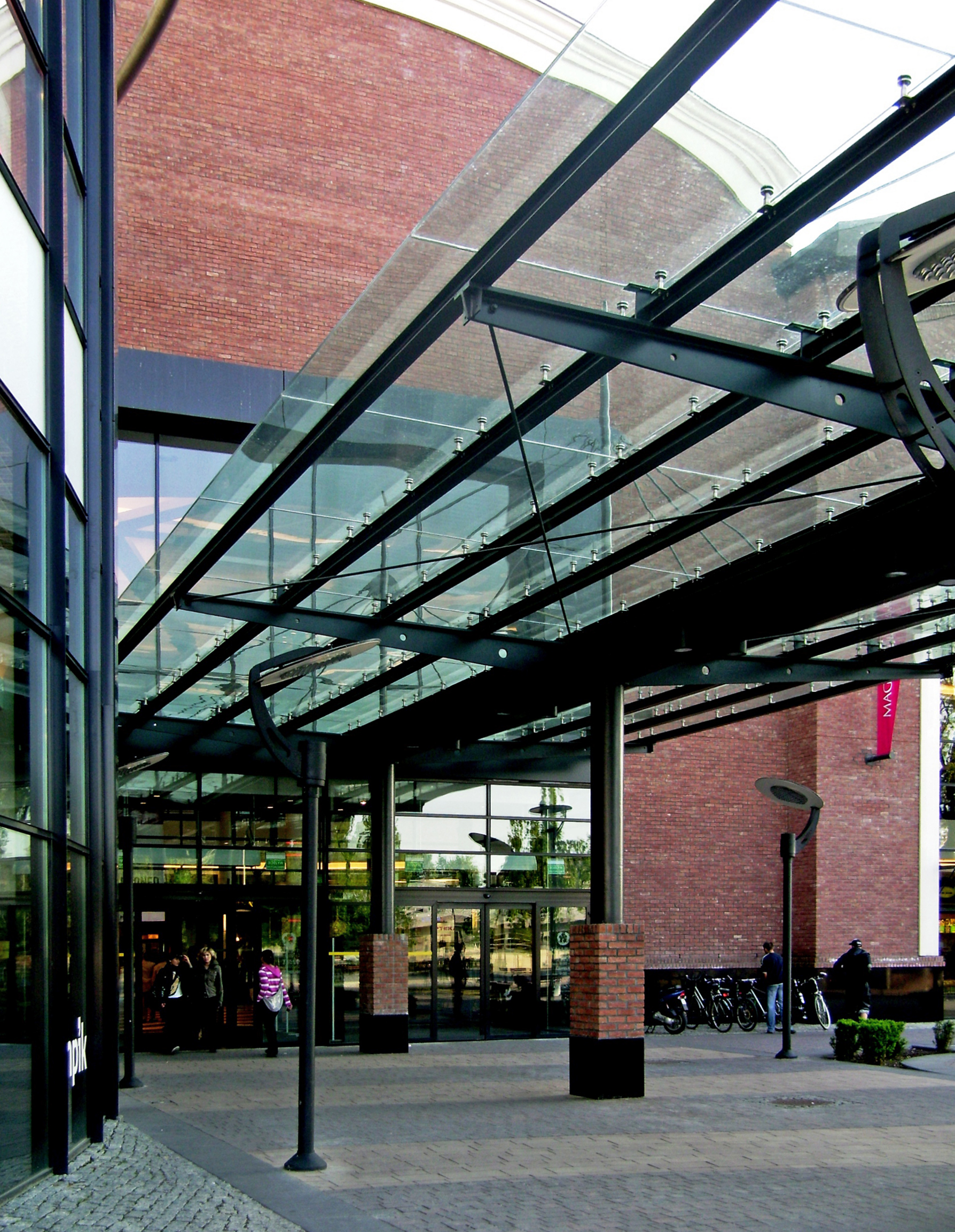

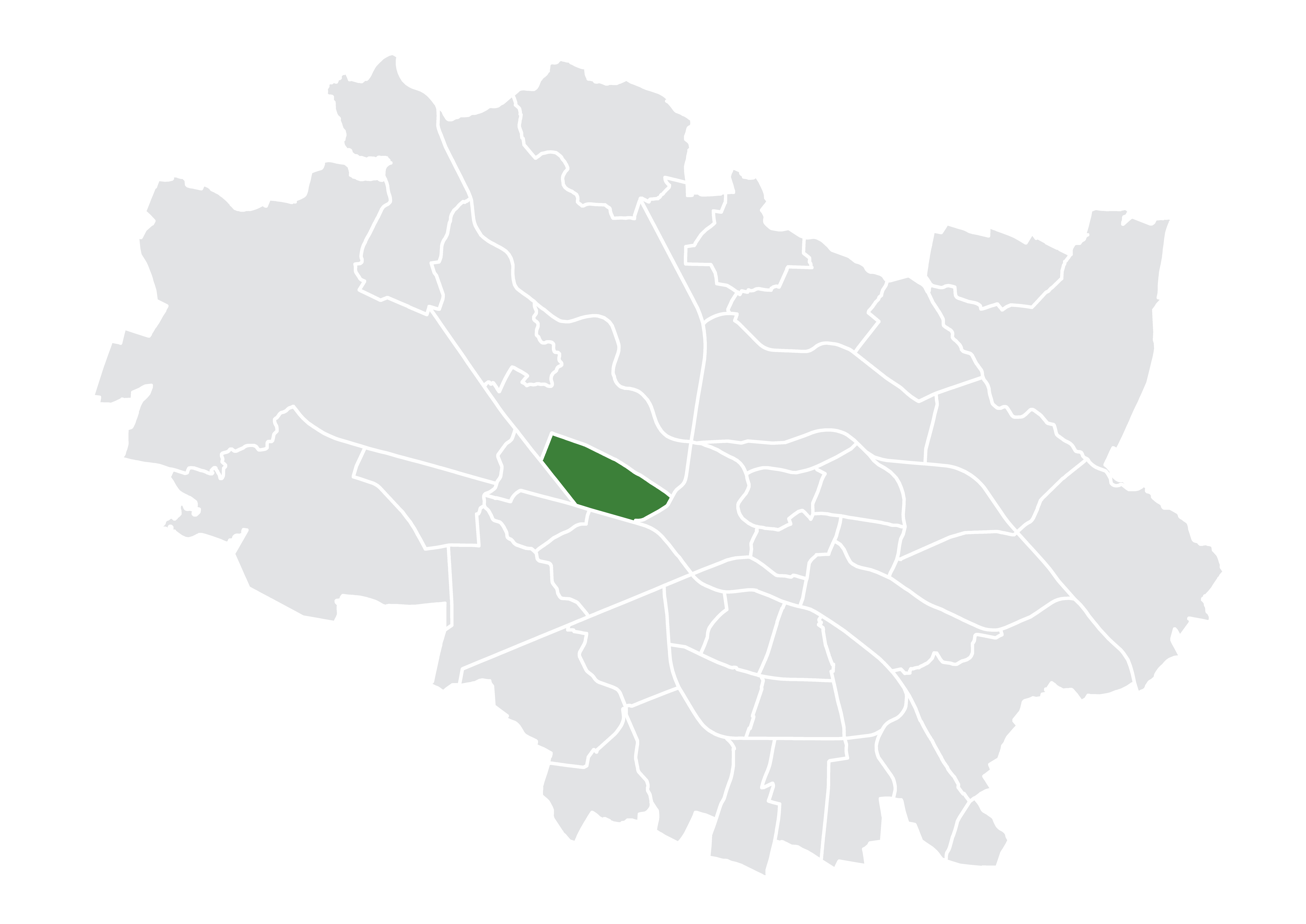
- Location of the district within Wrocław
- Country: Poland
- Voivodeship: Lower Silesian
- County/City: Wrocław
- Established: 1991

Population (2022)
  - Total: 24,508
- Time zone: UTC+1 (CET)
  - Summer (DST): UTC+2 (CEST)
- Area code: +48 71
- Website: Osiedle Gądów-Popowice Płd.

Gądów-Popowice Południowe (Polish pronunciation: [ˈgɔnduf pɔpɔˈvit͡sɛ pɔwudˈɲɔvɛ]) is a district in Wrocław located in the western part of the city. It was established in the territory of the former Fabryczna district.

The district consists of the neighborhoods of Gądów Mały (German: Klein Gandau) and the southern part of Popowice (German: Pöpelwitz). It neighbors the districts of Pilczyce-Kozanów-Popowice Północne, Szczepin, Muchobór Mały, Nowy Dwór, and Kuźniki.

In 1991, after reforms in the administrative division of Wrocław, Gądów-Popowice Południowe became one of the city's 48 districts.
