= Popowice =

Popowice may refer to the following places in Poland:

- Popowice, Lower Silesian Voivodeship (south-west Poland)
- Popowice, Kuyavian-Pomeranian Voivodeship (north-central Poland)
- Popowice, Łódź Voivodeship (central Poland)
- Popowice, Lesser Poland Voivodeship (south Poland)
- Popowice, Świętokrzyskie Voivodeship (south-central Poland)
- Popowice, Masovian Voivodeship (east-central Poland)
- Popowice, Pomeranian Voivodeship (north Poland)
- Popowice, Lubusz Voivodeship (west Poland)
- Popowice neighborhood of Wrocław, part of Gądów-Popowice Południowe and Pilczyce-Kozanów-Popowice Północne.
