= Maślice =

District in Wrocław, Poland

- District of Wrocław
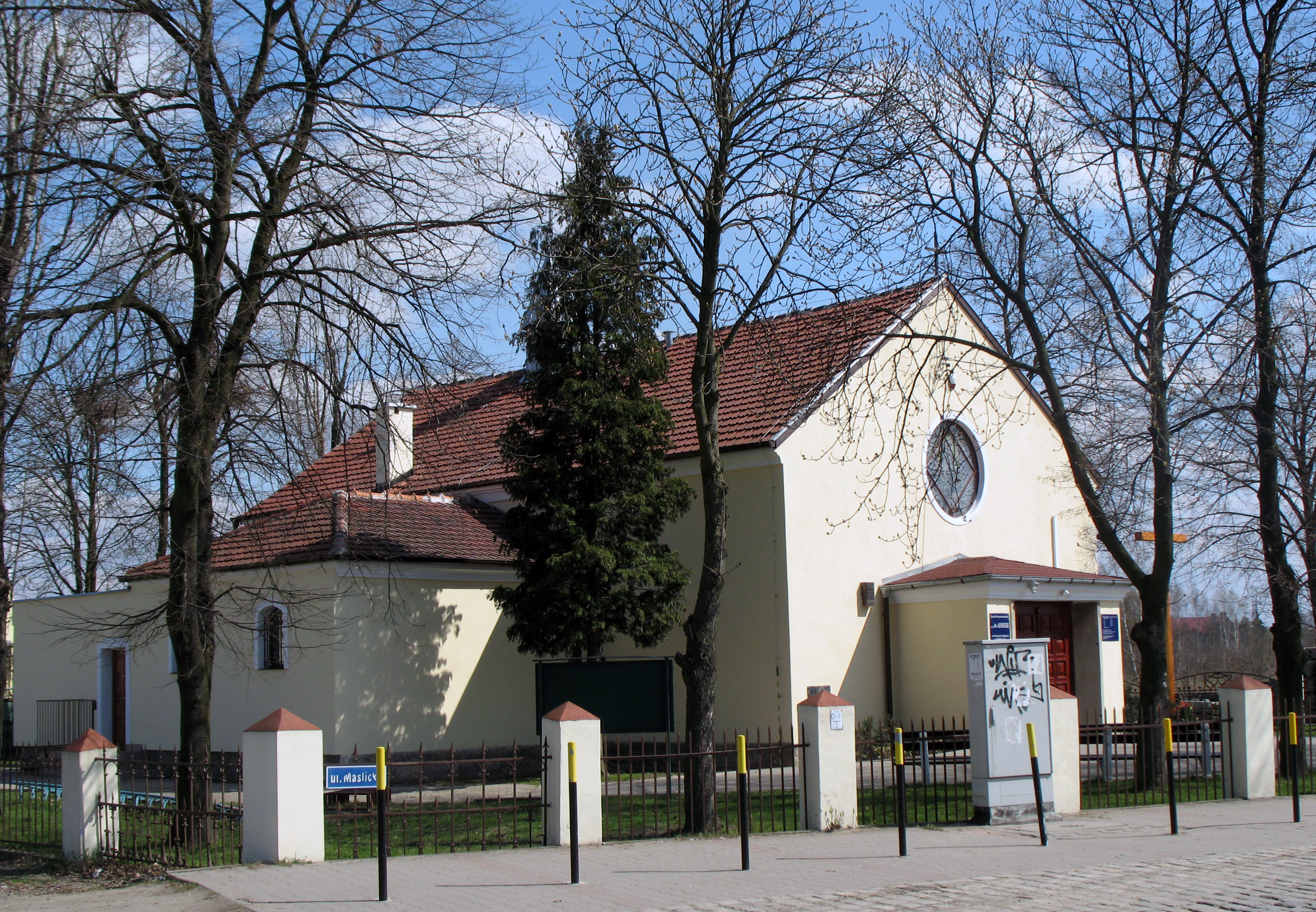
- Saint Agnes church

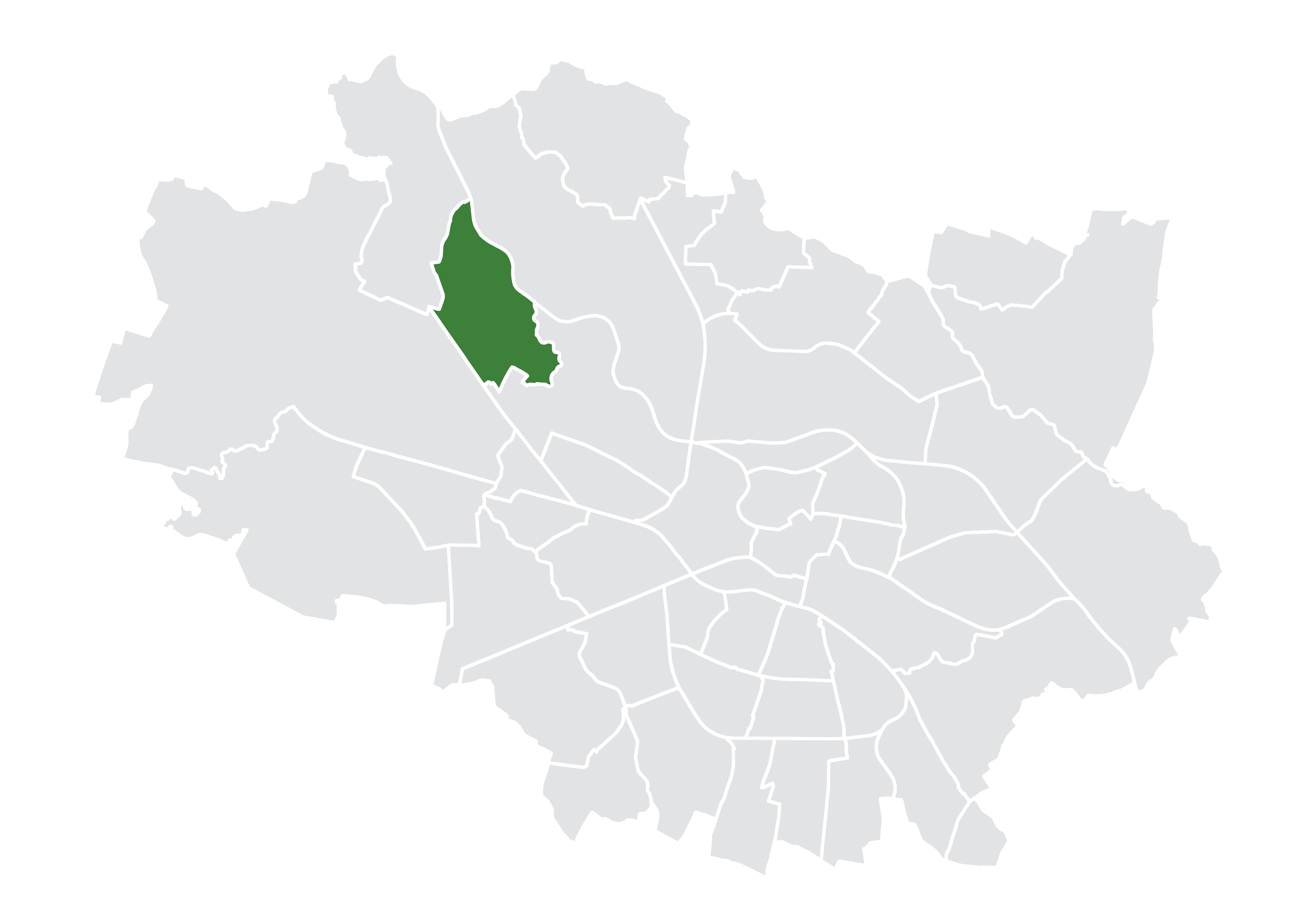
- Location of Maślice within Wrocław
- Country: Poland
- Voivodeship: Lower Silesian
- County/City: Wrocław
- First mentioned: 1193
- Incorporated into the city: 1928
- Established the modern-day district: 1991

Population (2022)
  - Total: 12,793
- Time zone: UTC+1 (CET)
  - Summer (DST): UTC+2 (CEST)
- Area code: +48 71
- Website: maslice.org

Maślice (Polish pronunciation: [maɕˈlit͡sɛ], German: Masselwitz, [ˈmasəlvɪt͡s]) is a district in Wrocław located in the north-western part of the city. It was established in the territory of the former Fabryczna district.

The Oder River flows to the east of Maślice, with the Pilczycki Forest extending in that direction. To the west, the neighborhood is separated from Stabłowice by a railroad. Pilczyce is located to the south of Maślice Małe, and Pracze Odrzańskie is located to the north of Maślice Wielkie, behind the landfill.

== Name ==
The earliest recorded name of the settlement is Maslec, derived from the Polish nickname Masło ('butter').

Heinrich Adamy's work on place names in Silesia, published in 1888 in Breslau, lists Maslic as the oldest place name, giving it the meaning Butterdorf ('butter village'). The name of the village was later phonetically Germanized to Masselwitz and lost its original meaning.

== History ==
The earliest record of the settlement of Maslec dates back to 1193, when it was part of medieval Piast-ruled Poland. The division of Maślice into Maślice Wielkie and Maślice Małe was first mentioned in 1630. It was incorporated into Breslau (Wrocław) in 1928.

In 1991, after reforms in the administrative division of Wrocław, Maślice became one of the city's 48 districts.
