= Pilczyce-Kozanów-Popowice Północne =

District in Wrocław, Poland

- District of Wrocław
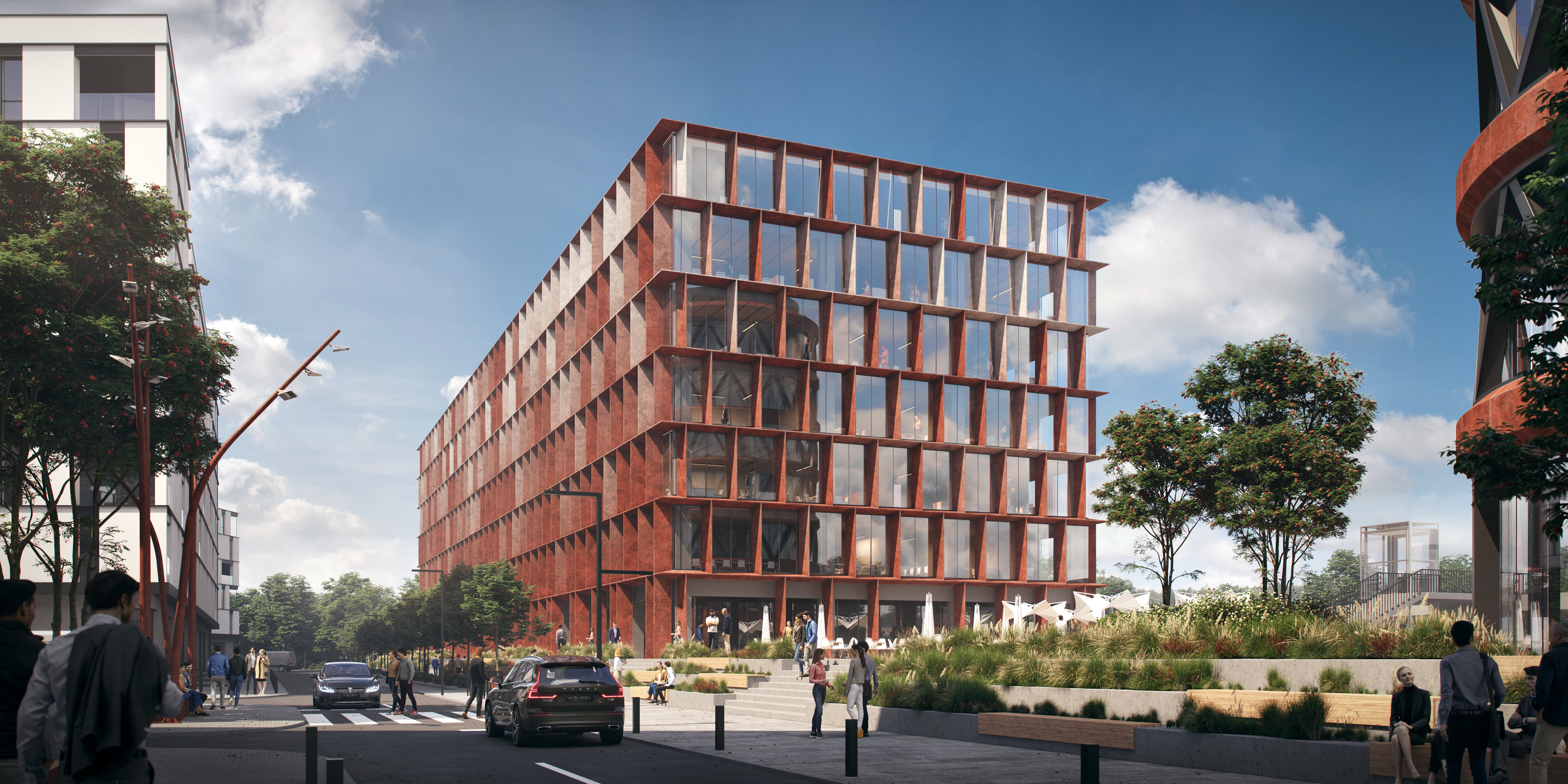

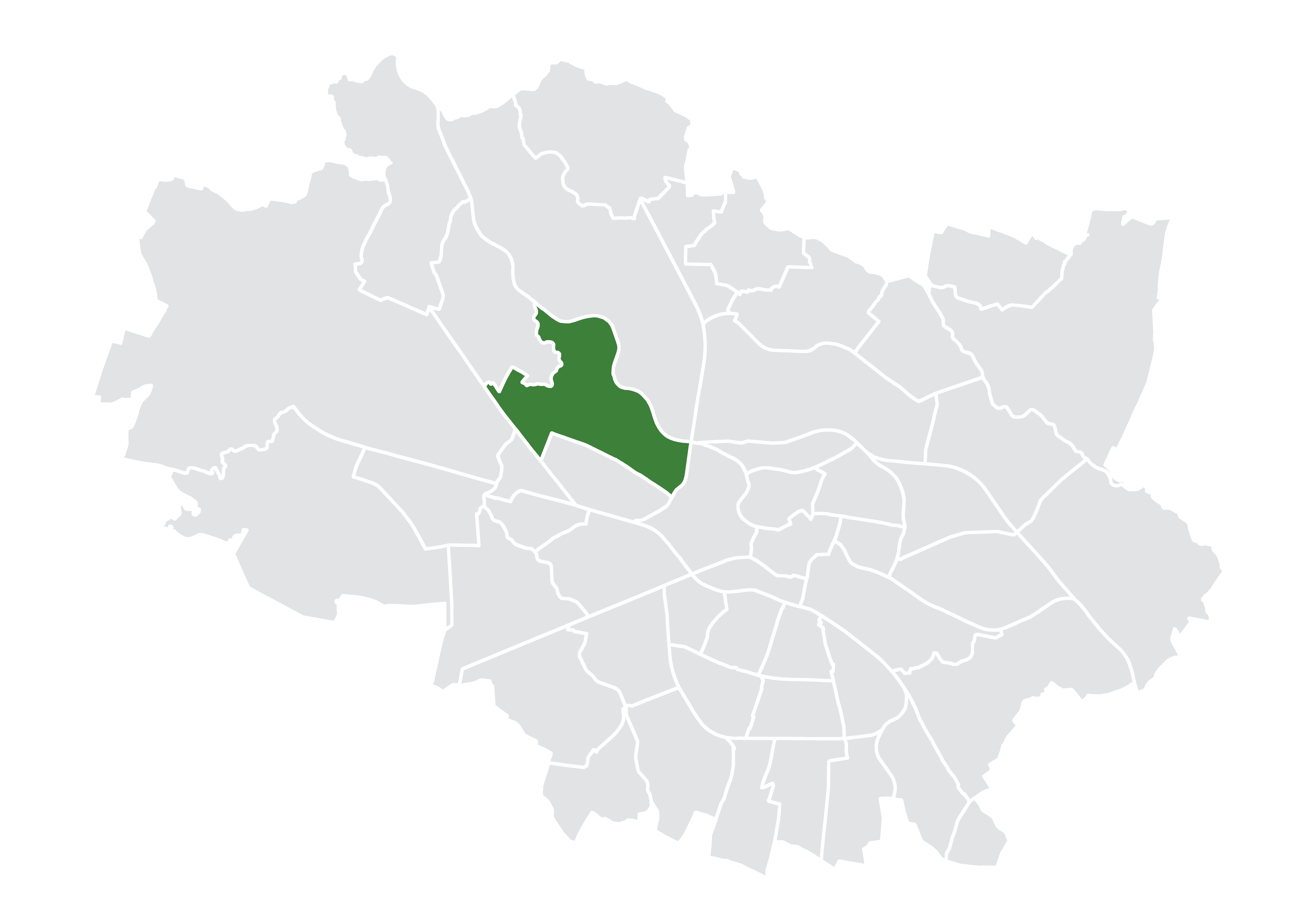
- Location of the district within Wrocław
- Country: Poland
- Voivodeship: Lower Silesian
- County/City: Wrocław
- Established: 1991

Population (2022)
  - Total: 31,320
- Time zone: UTC+1 (CET)
  - Summer (DST): UTC+2 (CEST)
- Area code: +48 71

Pilczyce-Kozanów-Popowice Północne (Polish pronunciation: [pilˈt͡ʂɨt͡sɛ kɔˈzanuf pɔpɔˈvit͡sɛ puwˈnɔt͡snɛ]) is a district in Wrocław located in the north-western part of the city. It was established in the territory of the former Fabryczna district.

The district consists of the neighborhoods of Pilczyce (German: Pilsnitz), Kozanów (German: Cosel) and the northern part of Popowice (German: Pöpelwitz). It neighbors the district of Szczepin to the east, Gądów-Popowice Południowe and Kuźniki to the south, Leśnica and Maślice to the west, and, through the Oder, the Osobowice-Rędzin district to the north.

== History ==
Before the war, a municipal cemetery was located on the site of Wrocław West Park. Today, a historic Jewish cemetery operates within the park.

In May 1945, Soviet troops occupied both settlements of Pilsnitz and Cosel. Following the war, a military base and Soviet Army training ground were established in the northwestern part of Kozanów. Today, this location is home to the Wrocław-Fabryczna police station.

Kozanów was a sparsely populated neighborhood until the 1970s, when characteristic blocks of flats made of large plates began to appear. In contrast, Pilczyce was mainly built up with two- and three-story multi-family houses with shared gardens or green courtyards at the rear, as early as the 1930s.

Popowice-Północe is a common part of the district estate, separated by a strip of Wrocław's inner ring road. Despite its rich history, the neighborhood, like neighboring Szczepin, was completely destroyed during the siege of Breslau.

Before the war and for many years after the war, Popowice and Kozanów were not settled in their riverside part due to the risk of floods. However, in the 1970s, large-panel apartment blocks were built in Popowice, disregarding these dangers.

In 1991, after reforms in the administrative division of Wrocław, Pilczyce-Kozanów-Popowice Północne became one of the city's 48 districts.

== Gallery ==
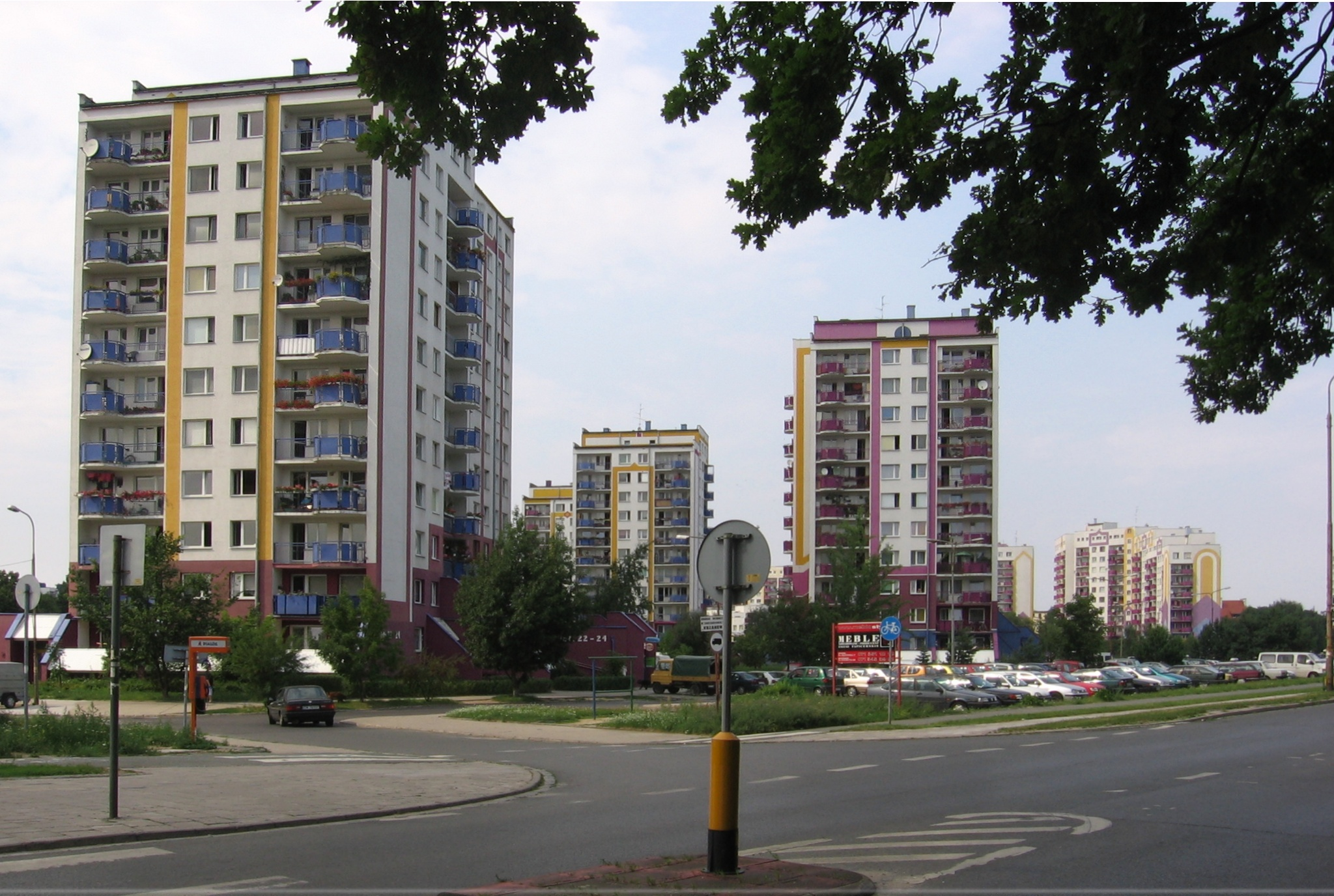
Kozanów

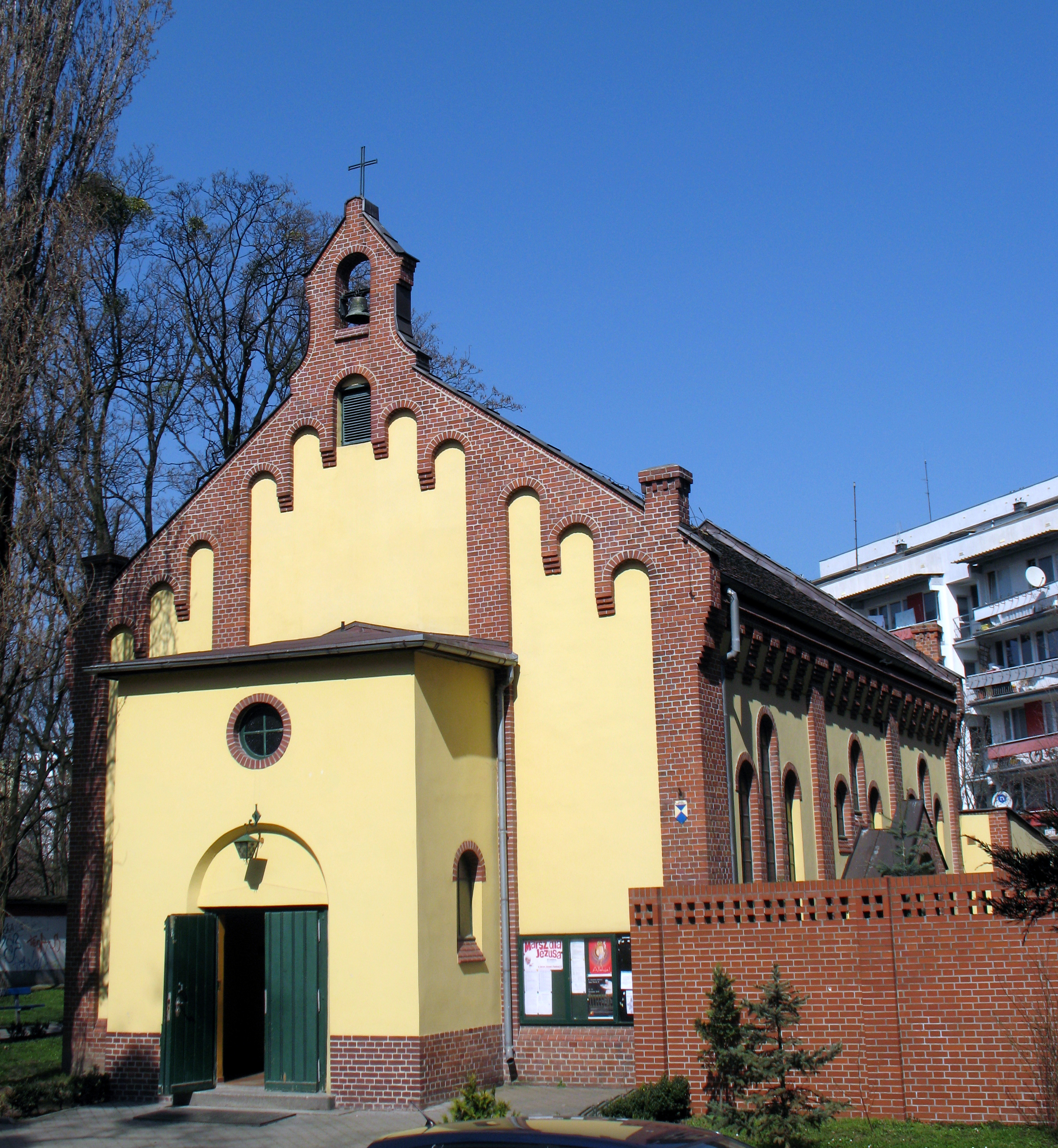
Popowice
