= Pracze Odrzańskie =

District in Wrocław, Poland

- District of Wrocław
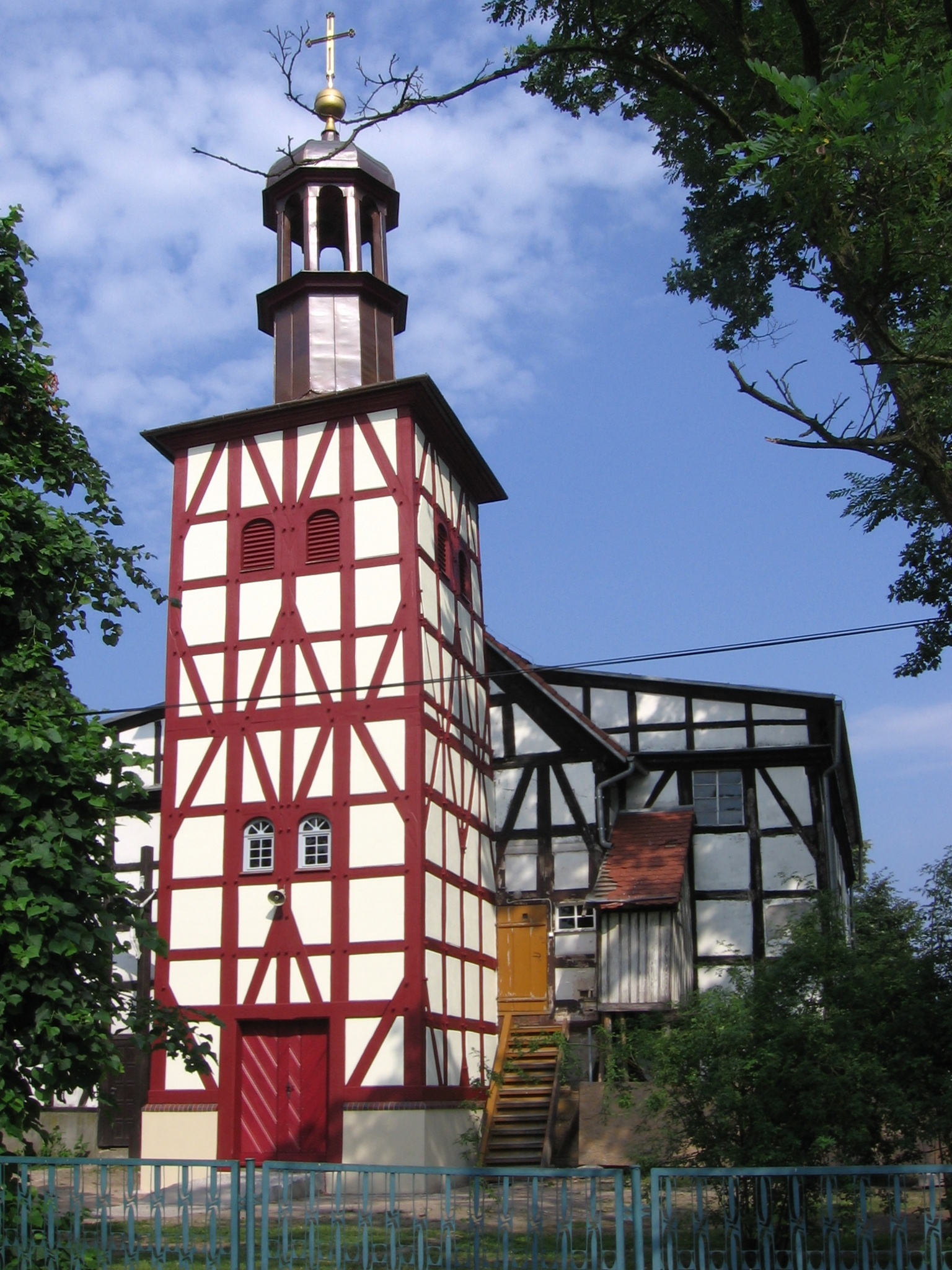
- Saint Anne church

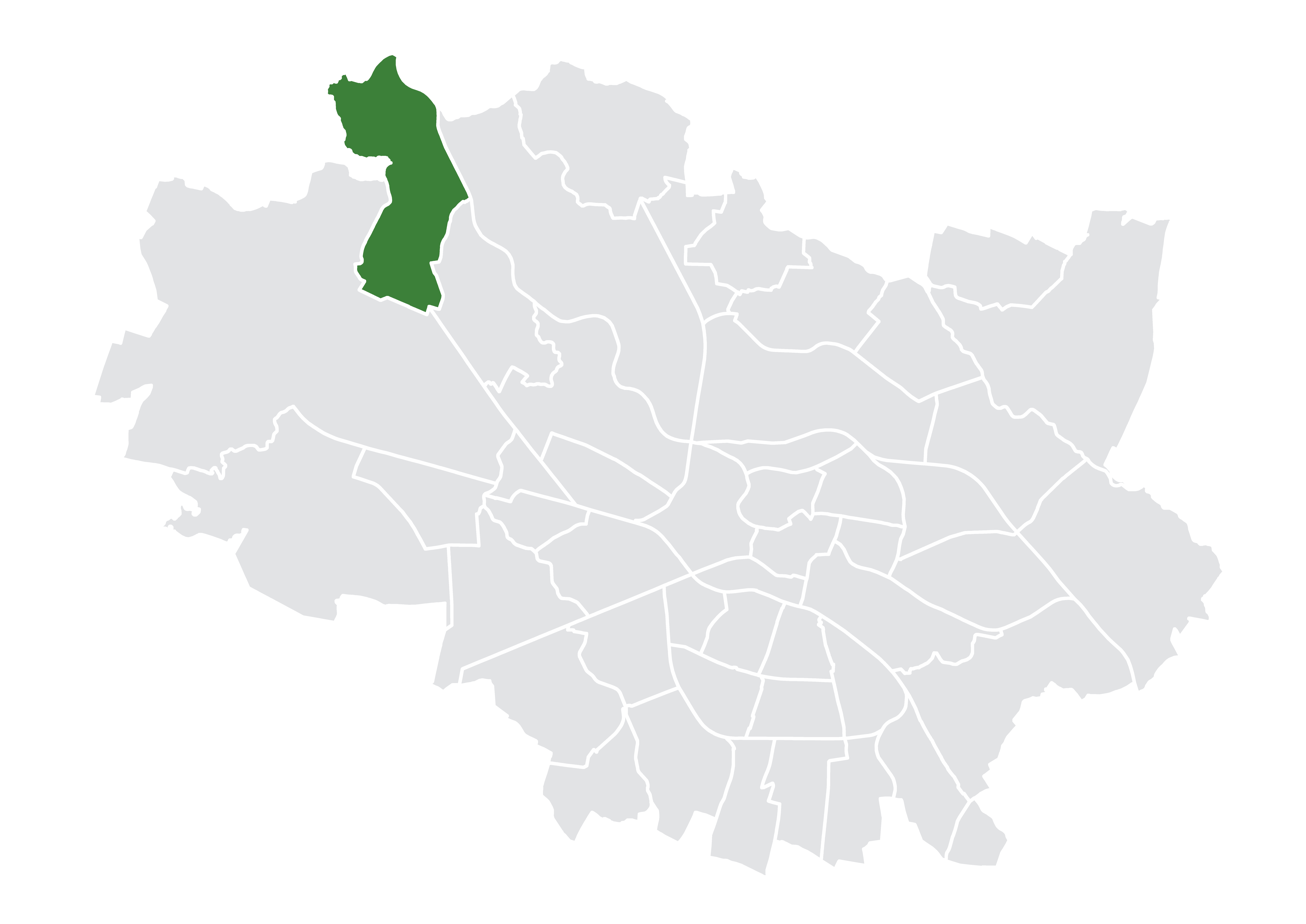
- Location of Pracze Odrzańskie within Wrocław
- Country: Poland
- Voivodeship: Lower Silesian
- County/City: Wrocław
- First mentioned: 1318
- Incorporated into the city: 1928
- Established the modern-day district: 1991

Population (2022)
  - Total: 6,045
- Time zone: UTC+1 (CET)
  - Summer (DST): UTC+2 (CEST)
- Area code: +48 71
- Website: Osiedle Pracze Odrzańskie

Pracze Odrzańskie (Polish pronunciation: [ˈprat͡ʂɛ odˈʐaɲskjɛ], German: Herrnprotsch, [hɛɐ̯nˈpʁɔt͡ʃ]) is a district in Wrocław located in the north-western part of the city. It was established in the territory of the former Fabryczna district.

== Name ==
The first mention of the village under the name of Protsch comes from a 1318 document in which Henry VI the Good, Duke of Wrocław, certified that the brothers Konrad, Henry, Tyczko and Jeszlin von Rydeburg sold the village to the brothers Albert and Arnold von Pak. The name was then mentioned as Pratsch (1321), Pratsch (1327), Pracz (1330), Pracz (1351), Protsch prope Lesnam (1353), Procz (1360), Proitsch prope Lesnam (1425), Prache (1425), Protsch bey der Lesse (1451), Protsch an der Oder (1491), Proitsch (1552), Protsch (1666–67), Protsch an der Oder (1743), Herrenprotsch (1794), Protsch an der Oder (1795), Herrnprotsch auch Protsch an der Oder (1830), Herrnprotsch – Pracze Odrzańskie, -y -ich, pracki (1948).

The name probably comes from the Polish word 'pracz' ('washerman'), and is related to the nature of the village, whose inhabitants were responsible for washing the clothes of the nearby Leśnica manor in the Middle Ages. The original name Pracze was then Germanized to Pratsch. From the 18th century it appeared as Herrnprotsch. The prefix Herrn- comes from the German word 'Herr' ('lord, owner').

In 1945, after the Polish administration took over the city, the name was mistakenly reconstructed and the settlement was first called Bródź. In 1947 the name was changed to Pracze and at the same time the distinguishing term Odrzańskie was added. As a result of this mistake, the main street leading to the district was called Brodzka, which has been kept to this day.

== History ==
It was first mentioned in 1318, when it was part of medieval Piast-ruled Poland.

Initially a village, the settlement was incorporated into Breslau (today's Wrocław) in 1928.

In 1991, after reforms in the administrative division of Wrocław, Pracze Odrzańskie became one of the city's 48 districts.
