= Fabryczna =

Former borough in Wrocław, Poland

Coordinates: 51°07′09″N 16°55′34″E

- Former borough of Wrocław
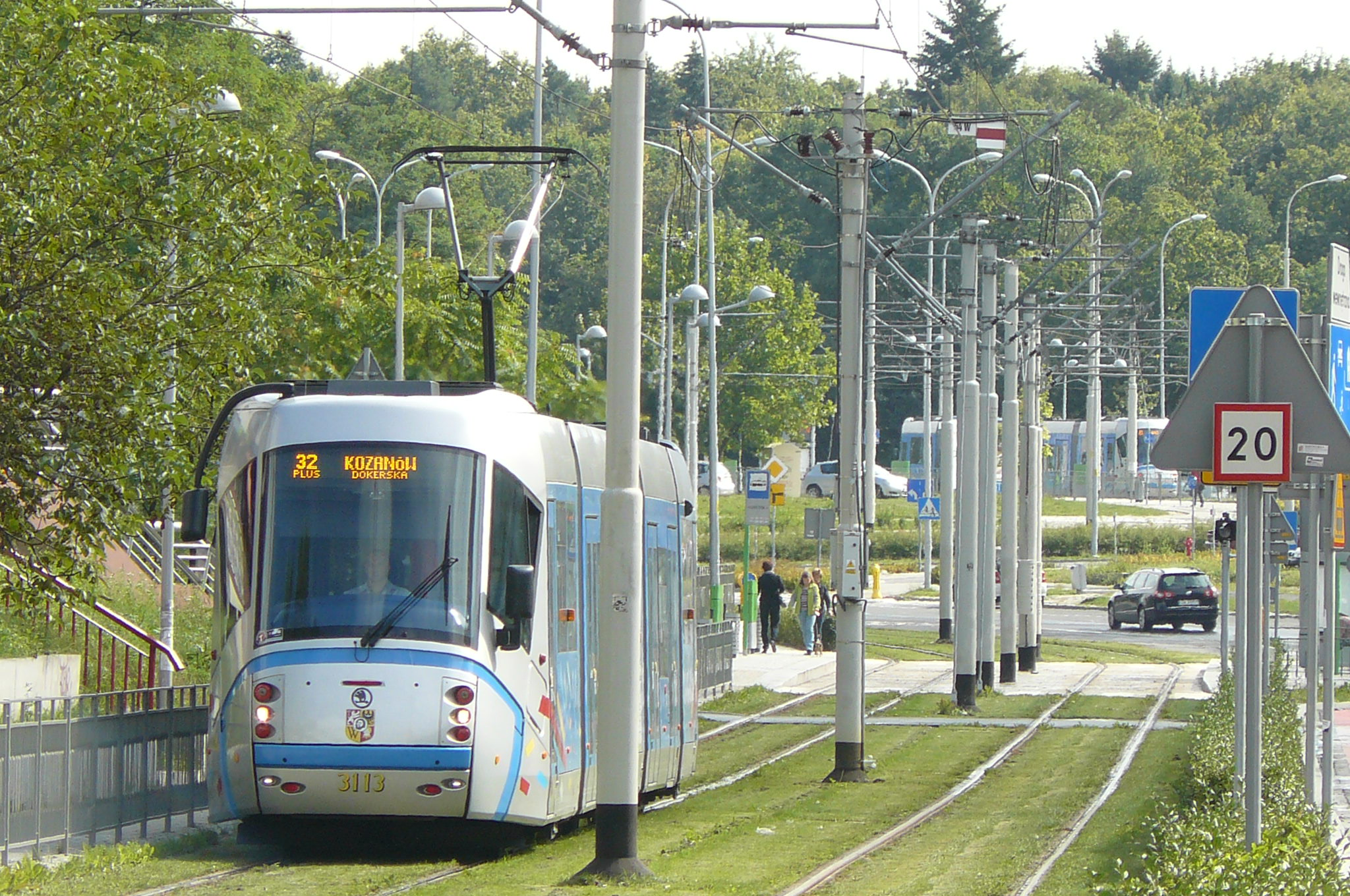

- Location of Fabryczna within Wrocław (red)
- Country: Poland
- Voivodeship: Lower Silesian
- County/City: Wrocław
- Established: 1952
- Dissolved: 1990

Population (2022)
  - Total: 196,477
- Time zone: UTC+1 (CET)
  - Summer (DST): UTC+2 (CEST)
- Area code: +48 71

Fabryczna (Polish pronunciation: [faˈbrɨt͡ʂna]) is a former borough of Wrocław located in the western part of the city. Before the changes in 1991, it was the largest district of Wrocław.

On 21 March 1991, the newly created City Office of Wrocław assumed many of the functions previously carried out within the borough. The name, though, remained in use, mainly for statistical and administrative purposes.

Fabryczna is a Polish adjective derived from the noun fabryka ('factory'), and therefore the name roughly translates as 'industrial.' It is located in the western part of the city, on the left (south) side of the Oder river.

== Subdivision ==
Since 1991, Fabryczna has been divided into 14 districts:

- Pilczyce-Kozanów-Popowice Płn.
- Gądów-Popowice Płd.
- Muchobór Mały
- Gajowice
- Grabiszyn-Grabiszynek
- Oporów
- Muchobór Wielki
- Nowy Dwór
- Kuźniki
- Żerniki
- Jerzmanowo-Jarnołtów-Strachowice-Osiniec
- Leśnica
- Maślice
- Pracze Odrzańskie

== Flood of 1997 ==
The northern part of Fabryczna district was severely damaged in the flood of 1997, especially in the Kozanów neighbourhood, which remained flooded for two weeks. Food and medicines were supplied to its inhabitants with the help of the military. The source of the flooding of this neighbourhood was not the Oder itself but the Bystrzyca, a small river which flows into the Oder in the proximity of Kozanów.

== Landmarks ==
Fabryczna is home to the Wrocław Municipal Stadium as well as several parks including Park Zachodni, and Park Tysiąclecia. The A8 highway runs through he district. The Milenijny and Rędziński bridges connect it to the other side of the Oder. The dzielnica is the location of the Magnolia Park shopping mall. It is also the home of the Wrocław Airport.

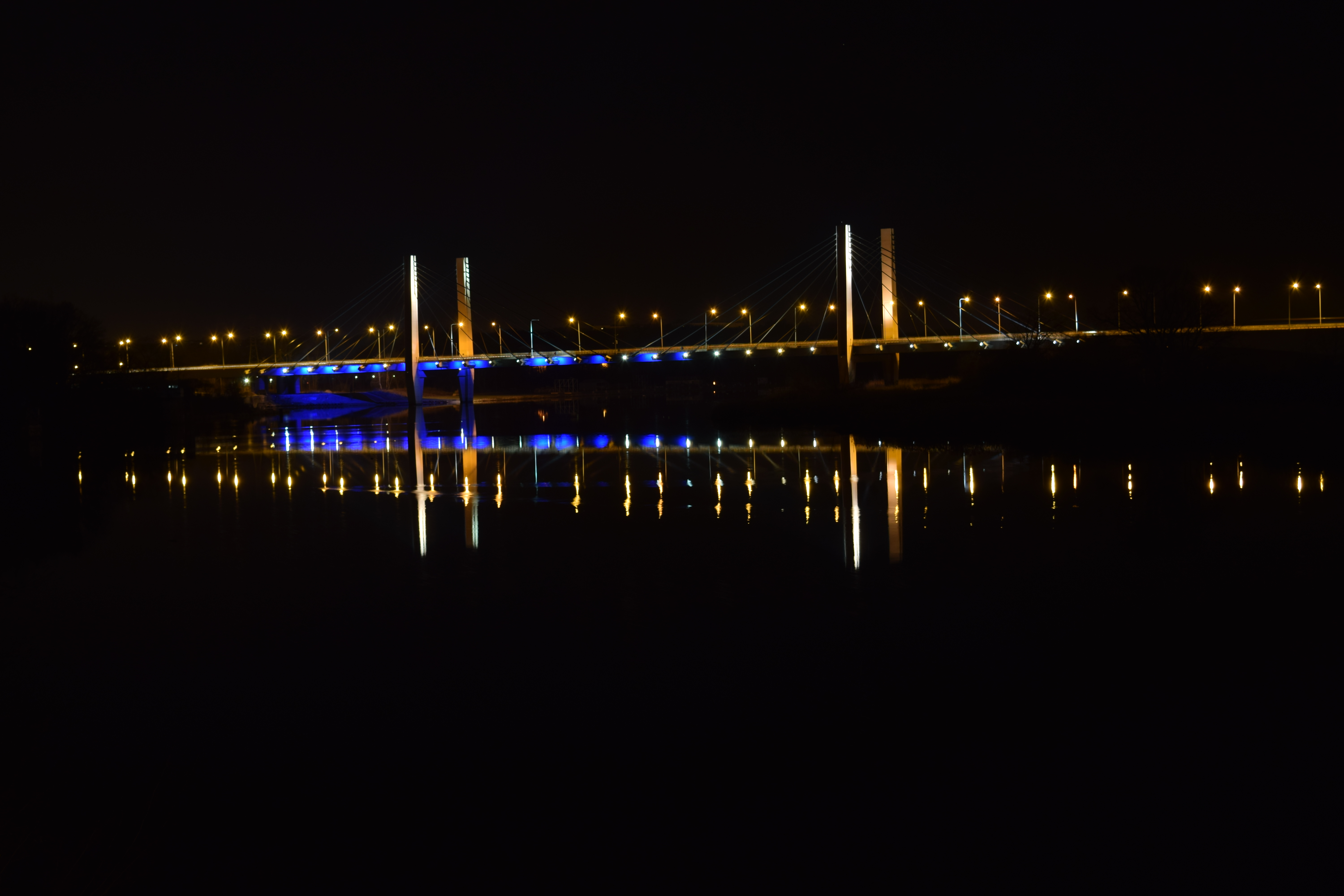
Milenijny Bridge

== Geography ==
=== Climate ===
This area has few extremes of temperature and ample precipitation in all months. The Köppen Climate Classification subtype for this climate is "Cfb". (Marine West Coast Climate).

Climate data for Fabryczna, Wrocław
Month	Jan	Feb	Mar	Apr	May	Jun	Jul	Aug	Sep	Oct	Nov	Dec	Year
Record high °C (°F)	19.7 (67.5)	20.1 (68.2)	25.4 (77.7)	32.0 (89.6)	33.9 (93.0)	38.0 (100.4)	39.0 (102.2)	37.7 (99.9)	34.9 (94.8)	28.1 (82.6)	20.9 (69.6)	17.7 (63.9)	39.0 (102.2)
Mean daily maximum °C (°F)	3.0 (37.4)	4.3 (39.7)	9.0 (48.2)	14.5 (58.1)	20.0 (68.0)	22.8 (73.0)	26.1 (79.0)	26.3 (79.3)	20.9 (69.6)	14.4 (57.9)	7.7 (45.9)	3.9 (39.0)	14.0 (57.2)
Daily mean °C (°F)	−0.5 (31.1)	0.4 (32.7)	4.2 (39.6)	9.9 (49.8)	14.9 (58.8)	18.2 (64.8)	19.9 (67.8)	19.5 (67.1)	15.2 (59.4)	10.0 (50.0)	4.7 (40.5)	0.9 (33.6)	9.8 (49.6)
Mean daily minimum °C (°F)	−3.7 (25.3)	−2.8 (27.0)	0.2 (32.4)	5.2 (41.4)	10.0 (50.0)	14.4 (57.9)	15.3 (59.5)	15.2 (59.4)	11.2 (52.2)	5.9 (42.6)	2.3 (36.1)	−2 (28)	5.9 (42.6)
Record low °C (°F)	−30 (−22)	−29.4 (−20.9)	−22.1 (−7.8)	−6.3 (20.7)	−3.1 (26.4)	1.1 (34.0)	4.7 (40.5)	2.9 (37.2)	−2 (28)	−6 (21)	−15.4 (4.3)	−22.7 (−8.9)	−30 (−22)
Average precipitation mm (inches)	34 (1.3)	32 (1.3)	39 (1.5)	38 (1.5)	54 (2.1)	69 (2.7)	75 (3.0)	65 (2.6)	43 (1.7)	38 (1.5)	41 (1.6)	38 (1.5)	566 (22.3)
Average precipitation days	14	12	12	10	13	12	14	13	11	13	15	12	151
Average relative humidity (%)	81	84	76	69	66	70	71	71	75	78	83	85	76
Mean monthly sunshine hours	59	68	117	169	221	225	223	217	151	118	54	44	1,670
