= Nowy Dwór, Wrocław =

District in Wrocław, Poland

Nowy Dwór
- District of Wrocław
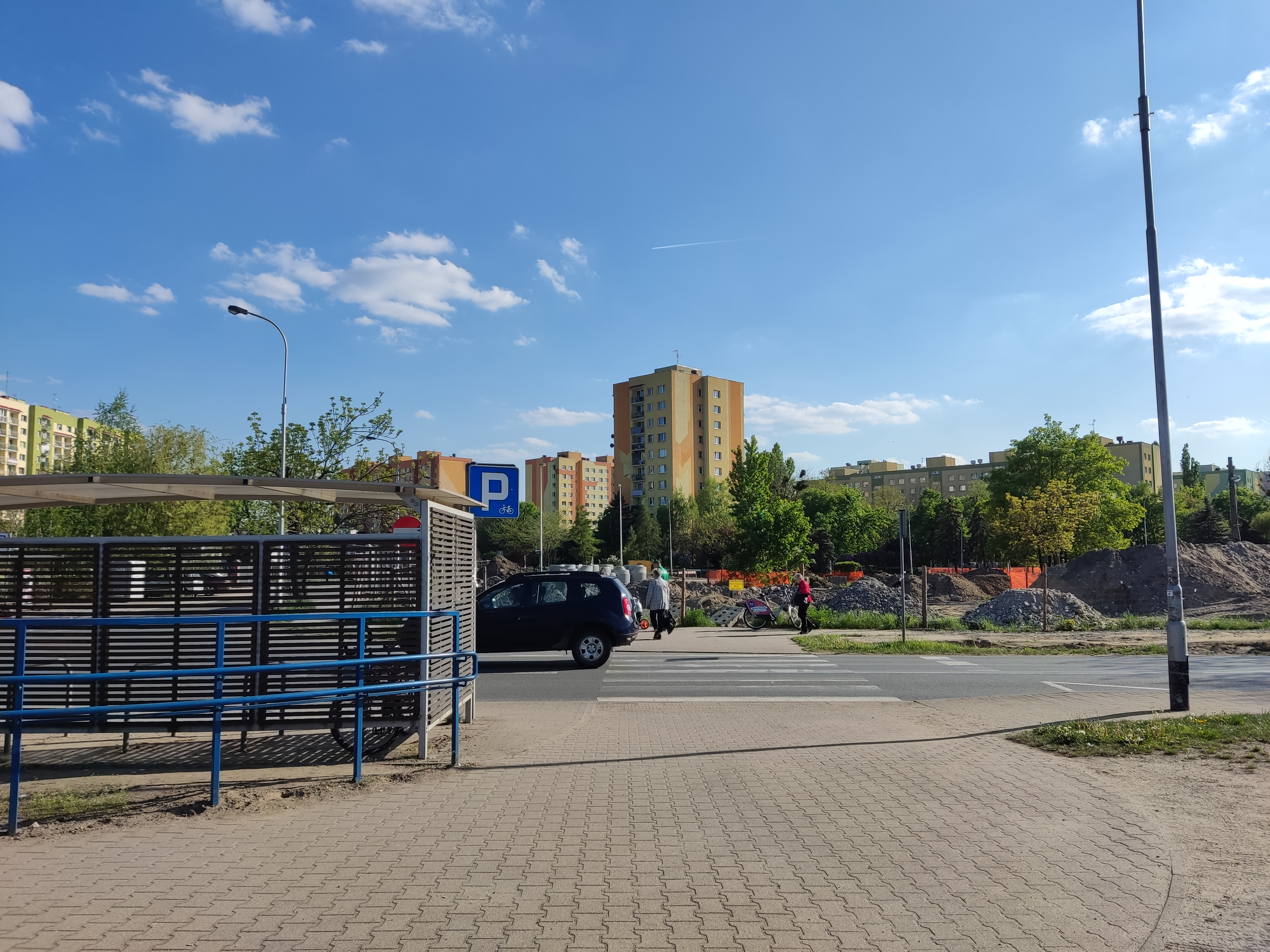

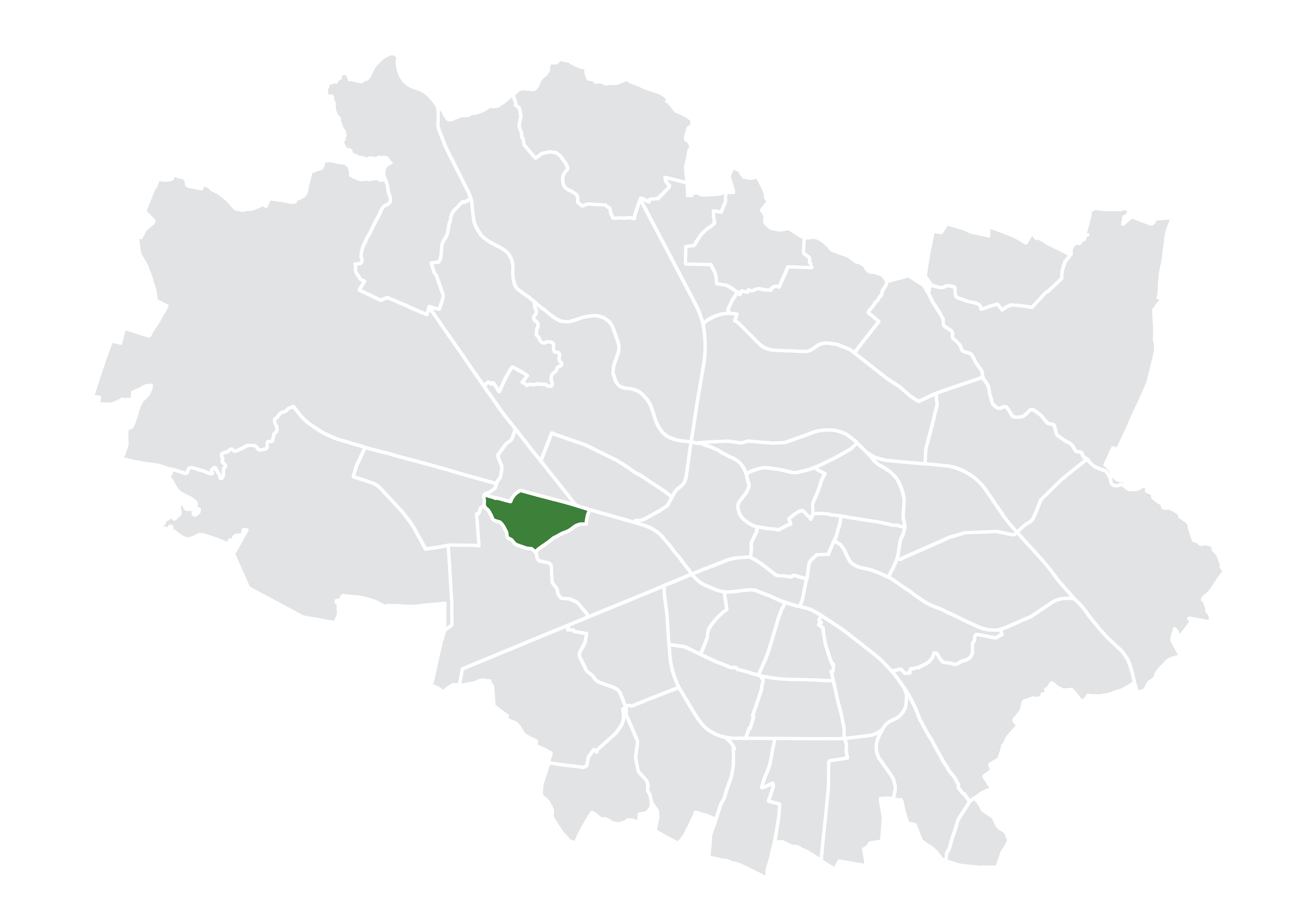
- Location of Nowy Dwór within Wrocław
- Country: Poland
- Voivodeship: Lower Silesian
- County/City: Wrocław
- First mentioned: 1280
- Incorporated into the city: 1928
- Established the modern-day district: 1991

Population (2022)
  - Total: 14,832
- Time zone: UTC+1 (CET)
  - Summer (DST): UTC+2 (CEST)
- Area code: +48 71

Nowy Dwór (Polish pronunciation: [ˈnɔvɨ dvur], lit. 'New Manor', German: Maria Höfchen, [maˈʁiːa ˈhøːfçən]) is a district in Wrocław located in the western part of the city. It was established in the territory of the former Fabryczna borough. The area incorporates one of West Wrocław's biggest housing estates, Nowy Dwór Estate.

Initially a village, the settlement was incorporated into Breslau (Wrocław) in 1928.

== History ==
Nowy Dwór was first mentioned in 1280 in Latin as Curia Nova, when it was part of medieval Piast-ruled Poland. In 1388, the abbot of the monastery sold the grange located in the village, and from 1551 all lease rights to Maria Höfchen belonged to Breslau.

The village gained a railroad connection in as early as 1844. It has been recognised as part of the city of Breslau since 1928.

In 1938, the area began its transformation into a community settlement. The project aimed to create "the largest residential complex in Breslau since Hitler's rise to power". The complex would consist of terraced, two- and three-storey buildings with access to small gardens, intended to house workers from a nearby rolling stock factory.

Construction of the settlement was only half completed due to World War II. In early 1945, the population was forcibly evacuated, resulting in a 90% depopulation of the district.

Construction of a new housing estate in Nowy Dwór began in the 1970s, consisting of numerous tower blocks constructed using a large-panel system. The estate's layout was designed in line with modernist principles and the idea of a 15-minute city. It features many green public spaces, playgrounds and public services, including a culture centre. Pre-war buildings, alongside most of the estate were gradually modernised, with original façades being covered up by insulation cladding. Elements of asbestos used in the tower blocks originally were removed.

In 1991, after reforms in the administrative division of Wrocław, Nowy Dwór became one of the city's 48 districts.

In 2023, a segregated bus and tram line to Nowy Dwór opened, which was the largest post-war transportation investment in Wrocław.
