= Muchobór Wielki =

District in Wrocław, Poland

Coordinates: 51°05′52″N 16°56′34″E

- District of Wrocław
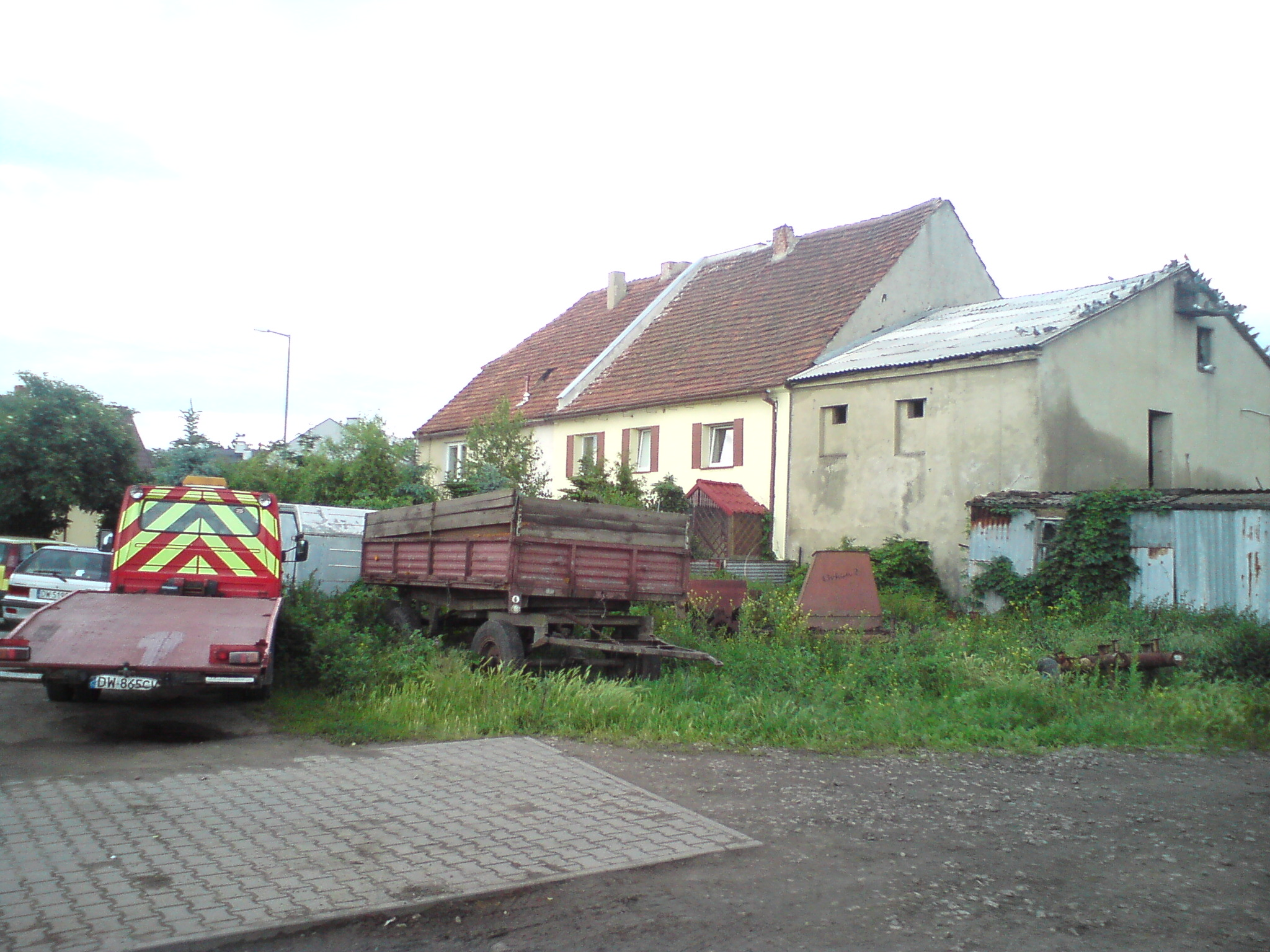

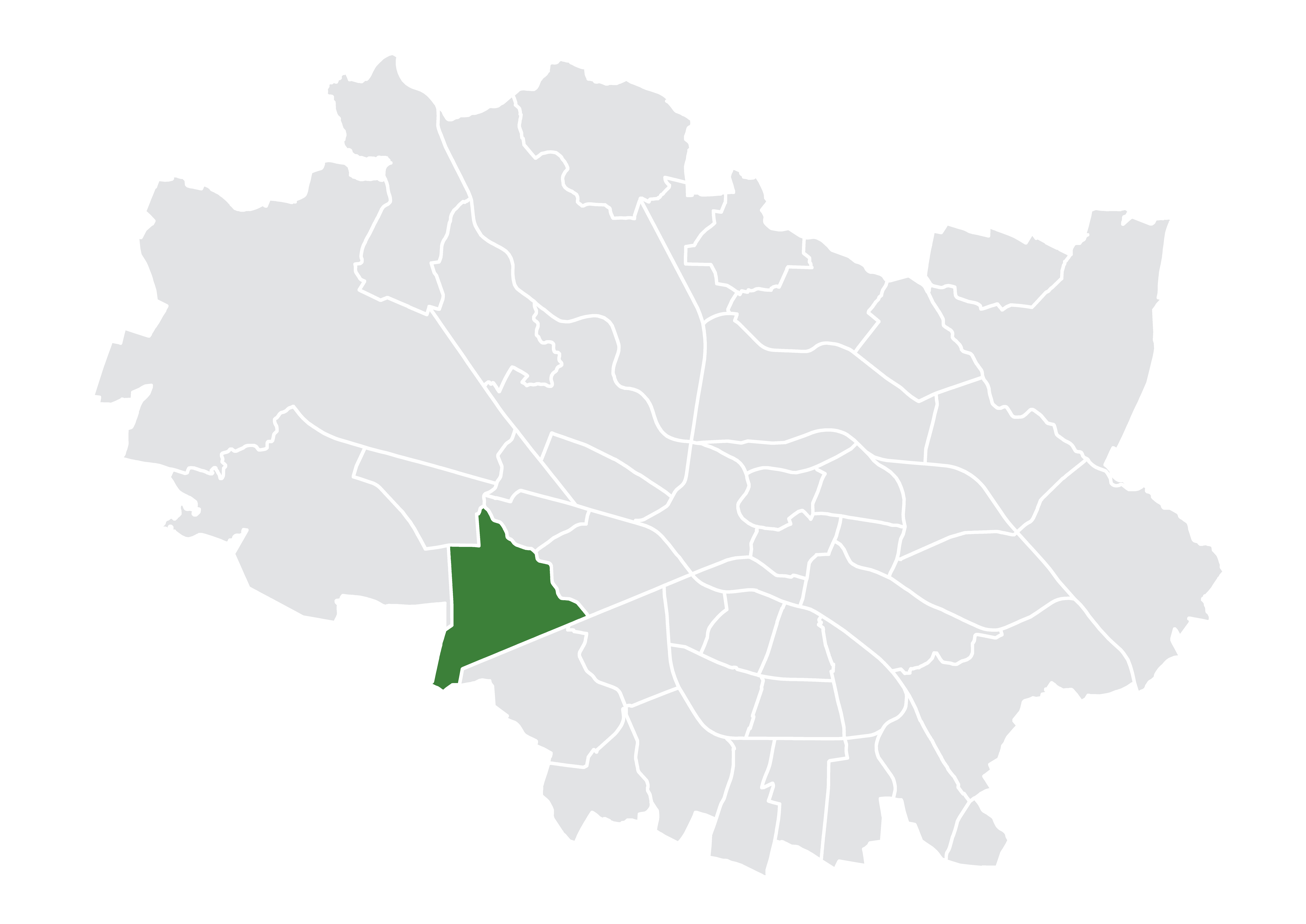
- Location of Muchobór Wielki within Wrocław
- Country: Poland
- Voivodeship: Lower Silesian
- County/City: Wrocław
- Incorporated into the city: 1951
- Established the modern-day district: 1991

Population (2022)
  - Total: 13,098
- Time zone: UTC+1 (CET)
  - Summer (DST): UTC+2 (CEST)
- Area code: +48 71
- Website: Osiedle Muchobór Wielki

Muchobór Wielki (Polish: [muˈxɔbur ˈvjɛlkʲi]; German: Groß Mochbern [ɡʁoːs ˈmɔxbɛʁn]) is a district in Wrocław located in the south-western part of the city. It was established in the territory of the former Fabryczna district.

Initially a village, the settlement was incorporated into Wrocław on January 1, 1951.

== Name ==
The name Muchobor (without distinguishing between Mały and Wielki) was first mentioned in 1155. The name is derived from a combination of two Polish words – 'mucha' ('fly') and bór ('conifer forest'). In 1315, the equivalent of the suffix Wielki was added to the name.

Heinrich Adamy's work on place names in Silesia, published in 1888 in Breslau, lists Muchobor as the oldest place name, giving it the meaning Fliegenwald ('forest of flies'). The name of the village was later phonetically Germanized to Mochbern and lost its original meaning.

During the Nazi era, to remove traces of the settlement's Polish origins, its name was changed to Lohbrück. In 1946, the Polish administration named the village Muchobór Wielki.

== History ==
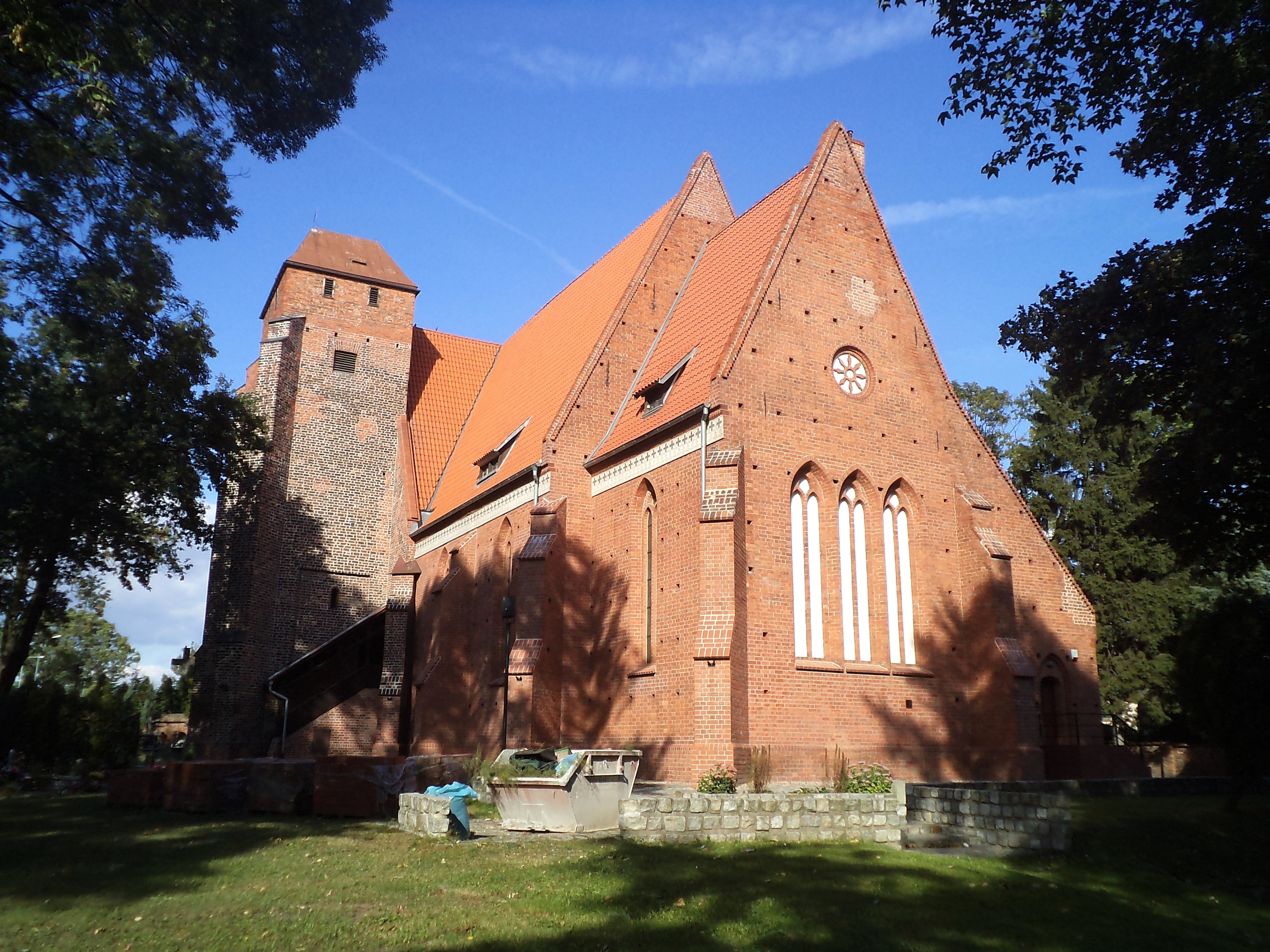
Medieval Gothic Saint Michael Archangel church

First records of Muchobór come from 1155 and 1245, when it was part of medieval Piast-ruled Poland.

In 1474, a ceasefire was signed there by Kings Casimir IV of Poland, his son Vladislaus II of Bohemia and Matthias Corvinus of Hungary.

In the 18th century, it was annexed by Prussia under the Germanized name Mochbern, yet it was still inhabited mostly by people of Polish origin in the 18th and early 19th centuries. Until the secularization of church property in Prussia in 1810, it belonged to the Breslau chapter.

On February 23, 1945, it was captured by Soviet troops. On January 1, 1951, it officially became part of Wrocław.

In 1991, after reforms in the administrative division of Wrocław, Muchobór Wielki became one of the city's 48 districts.
