= Muchobór Mały =

District in Wrocław, Poland

- District of Wrocław
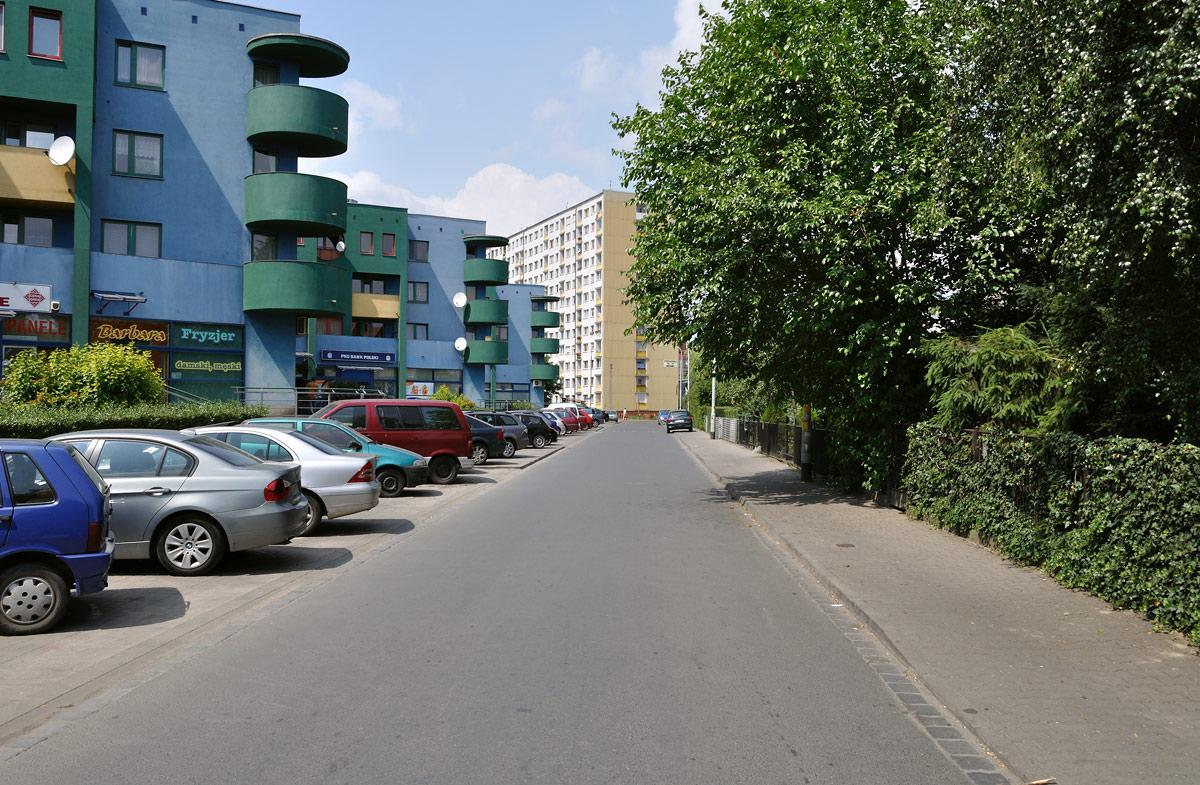

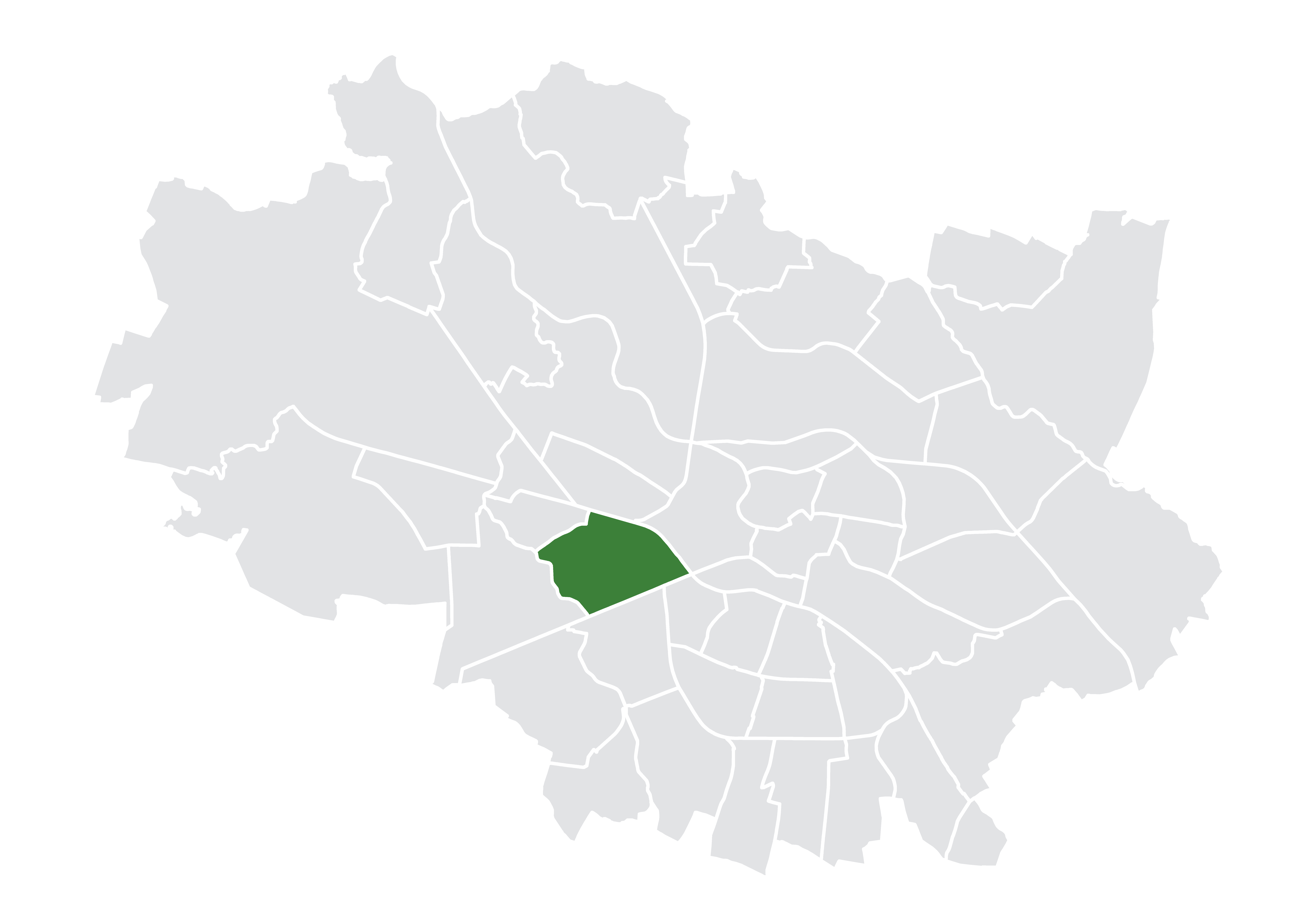
- Location of Muchobór Mały within Wrocław
- Country: Poland
- Voivodeship: Lower Silesian
- County/City: Wrocław
- Incorporated into the city: 1928
- Established the modern-day district: 1991

Population (2022)
  - Total: 7,586
- Time zone: UTC+1 (CET)
  - Summer (DST): UTC+2 (CEST)
- Area code: +48 71
- Website: Osiedle Muchobór Mały

Muchobór Mały (Polish pronunciation: [muˈxɔbur ˈmawɨ], German: Klein Mochbern, [klaɪ̯n ˈmɔxbɛɐ̯n]) is a district in Wrocław located in the western part of the city. It was established in the territory of the former Fabryczna district.

== Name ==
The name Muchobor (without distinguishing between Mały and Wielki) was first mentioned in 1155. The name is derived from a combination of two Polish words – 'mucha' ('fly') and bór ('conifer forest').

Muchobór Mały was first mentioned in Latin in 1311 as Mochbor Parvum, and in 1405 as Mochebor Minor.

Heinrich Adamy's work on place names in Silesia, published in 1888 in Breslau, lists Muchobor as the oldest place name, giving it the meaning Fliegenwald ('forest of flies'). The name of the village was later phonetically Germanized to Mochbern and lost its original meaning.

== History ==
First records of Muchobór Mały date back to 1193. In 1311, by virtue of a document issued by Pope Innocent III, it was transferred to the ownership of the Augustinian congregation at the Church of St Mary on the Sand in Wrocław. The Augustinians held possession of the settlement until the secularization of monastic property in Prussia in 1810. The village was part of Poland in the Middle Ages, and in the later periods it passed to Bohemia, Hungary, Austria, Prussia and Germany.

In 1874, a railroad station was built and put into service in Klein Mochbern. In 1928, the settlement was incorporated to Breslau (Wrocław) as a dynamically developing worker-industrial district.

On April 1, 1945, the district was captured by the Red Army.

In 1991, after reforms in the administrative division of Wrocław, Muchobór Mały became one of the city's 48 districts.
