= Żerniki, Wrocław =

District in Wrocław, Poland

Żerniki
- District of Wrocław
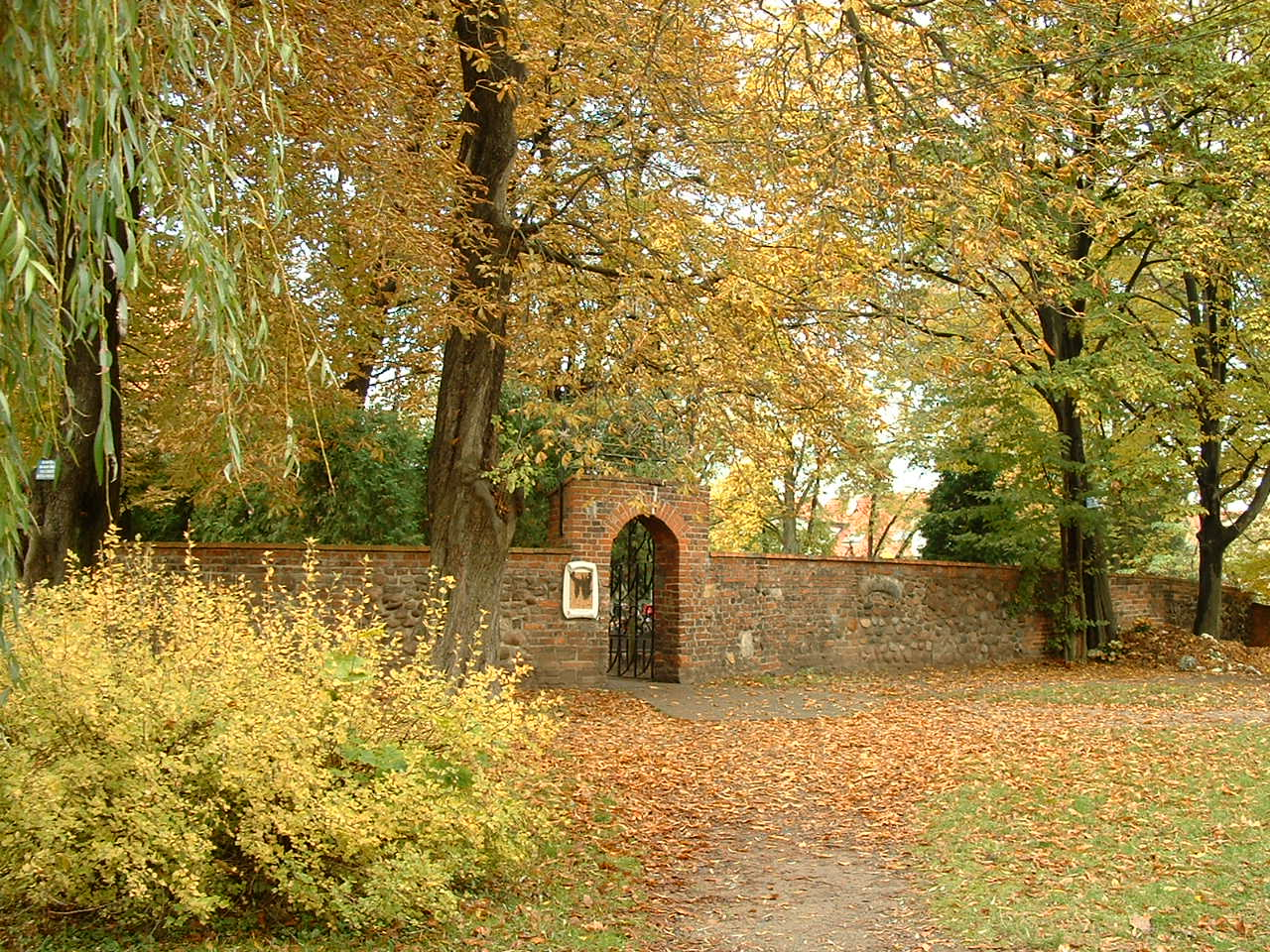

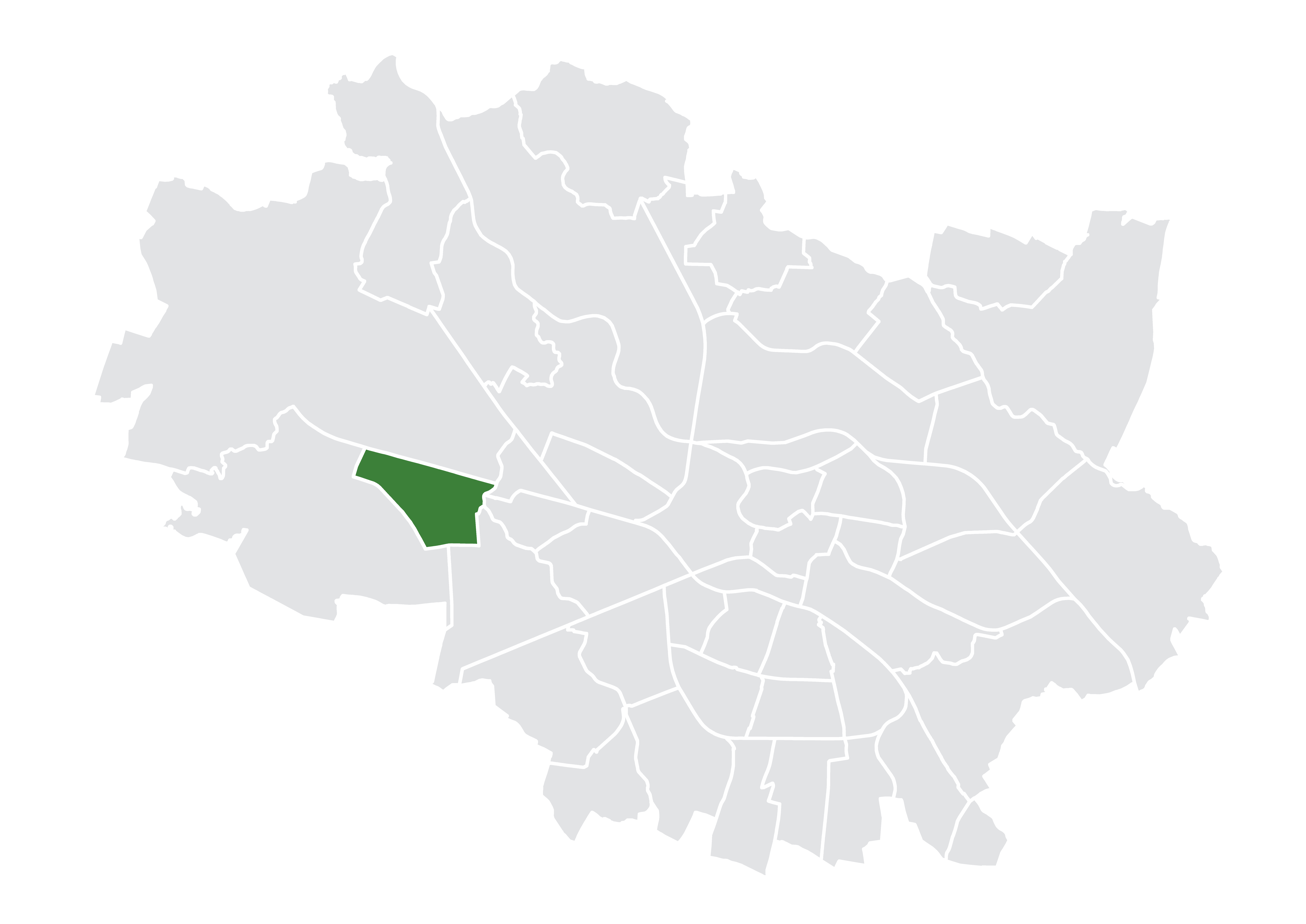
- Location of Żerniki within Wrocław
- Country: Poland
- Voivodeship: Lower Silesian
- County/City: Wrocław
- First mentioned: 1257
- Incorporated into the city: 1928
- Established the modern-day district: 1991

Population (2022)
  - Total: 3,961
- Time zone: UTC+1 (CET)
  - Summer (DST): UTC+2 (CEST)
- Area code: +48 71
- Website: Osiedle Żerniki

Żerniki (Polish: [ʐɛrˈɲikʲi]; German: Neukirch [ˈnɔʏkɪʁç]) is a district in Wrocław located in the western part of the city. It was established in the territory of the former Fabryczna district.

== History ==
It was first mentioned in 1257, when it was part of medieval Piast-ruled Poland.

Initially a village, the settlement was incorporated into Breslau (Wrocław) in 1928. In 1991, after reforms in the administrative division of Wrocław, Żerniki became one of the city's 48 districts.
