= Kuźniki, Wrocław =

District in Wrocław, Poland

Kuźniki
- District of Wrocław
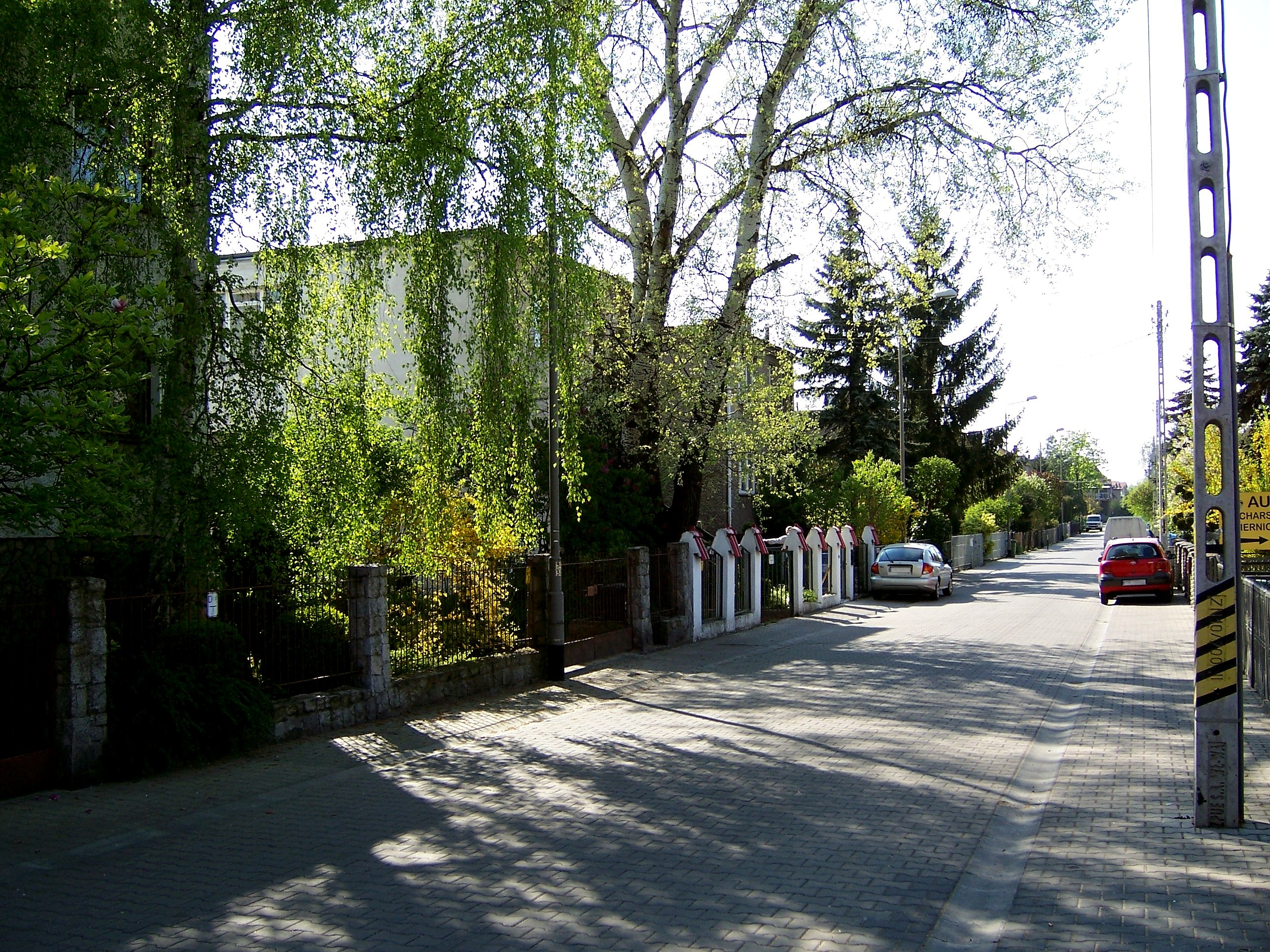

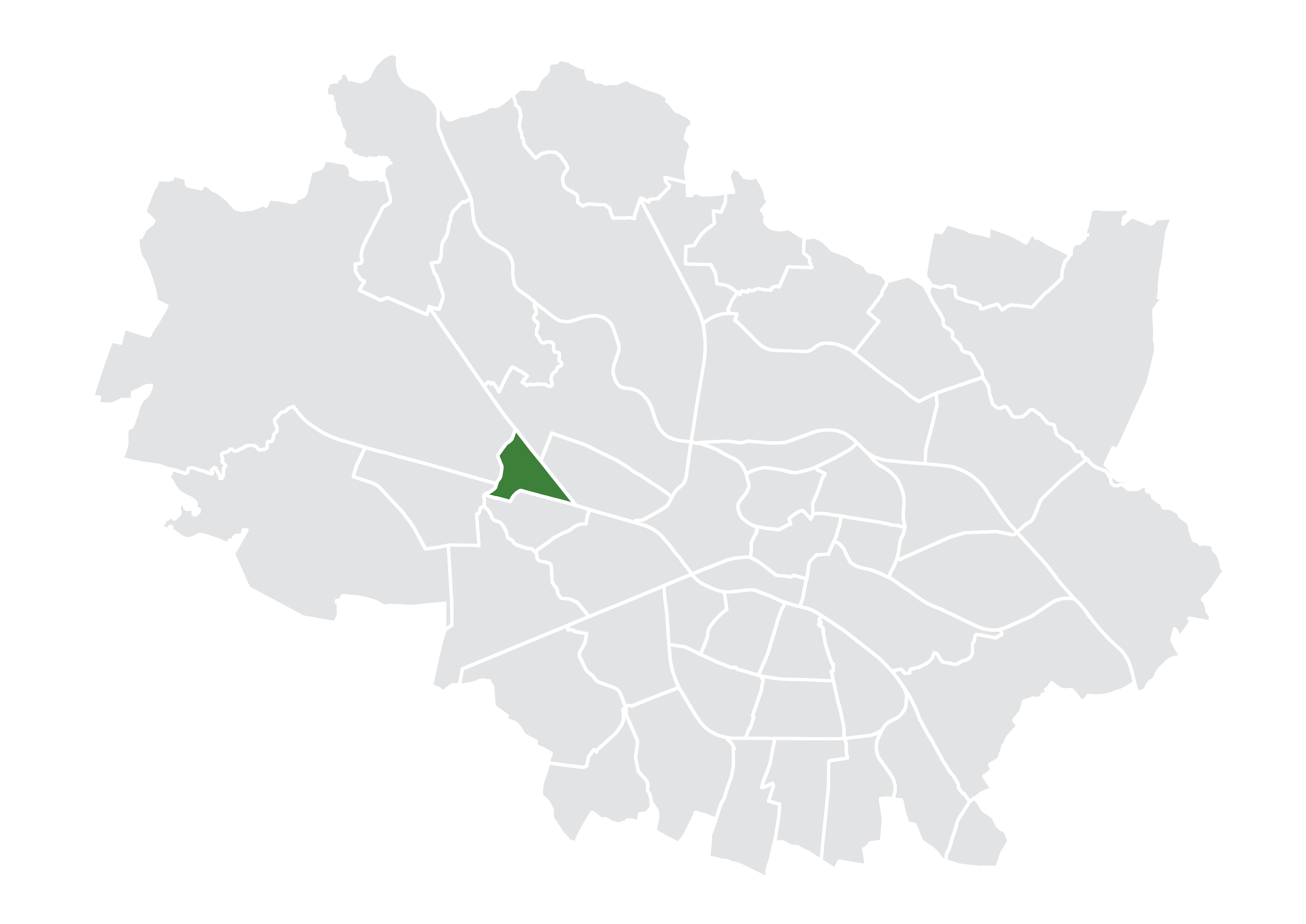
- Location of Kuźniki within Wrocław
- Country: Poland
- Voivodeship: Lower Silesian
- County/City: Wrocław
- First mentioned: 1288
- Incorporated into the city: 1928
- Established the modern-day district: 1991

Population (2022)
  - Total: 5,569
- Time zone: UTC+1 (CET)
  - Summer (DST): UTC+2 (CEST)
- Area code: +48 71
- Website: Osiedle Kuźniki

Kuźniki (Polish pronunciation: [kuʑˈɲiki], German: Schmiedefeld, [ˈʃmiːdəfɛlt]) is a district in Wrocław located in the western part of the city. It was established in the territory of the former Fabryczna district.

Initially a village, the settlement was incorporated into Breslau (today's Wrocław) in 1928.

== History ==
The first record of the village of Schmiedefeld dates back to 1288, when it was part of medieval Piast-ruled Poland. For many centuries, it functioned mainly as a huge farmstead. It was only in the mid-19th century that residential houses, an inn, three craftsmen's businesses and two stores appeared alongside the farmstead. Since Schmiedefeld became an attractive industrial area, it was incorporated into Breslau in 1928.

After the war, it was renamed Hermanowo. The name got later changed to Kuźniki.

In 1991, after reforms in the administrative division of Wrocław, Kuźniki became one of the city's 48 districts.
