= Leśnica, Wrocław =

District in Wrocław, Poland

Leśnica
- District of Wrocław
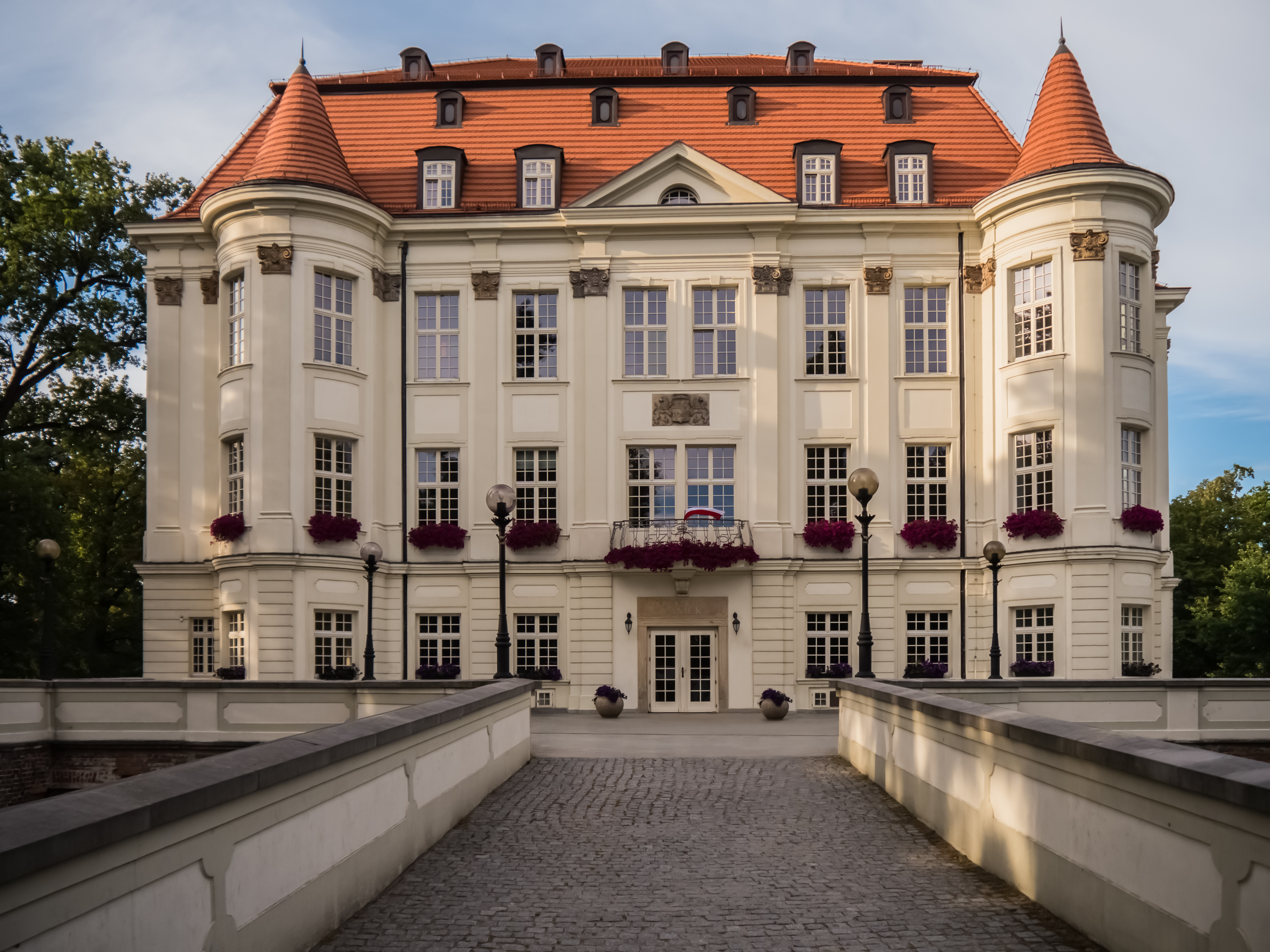
- Leśnica Castle, first built as a residence of the Piast dynasty in the 12th century, later a bourgeois residence, and today a cultural center

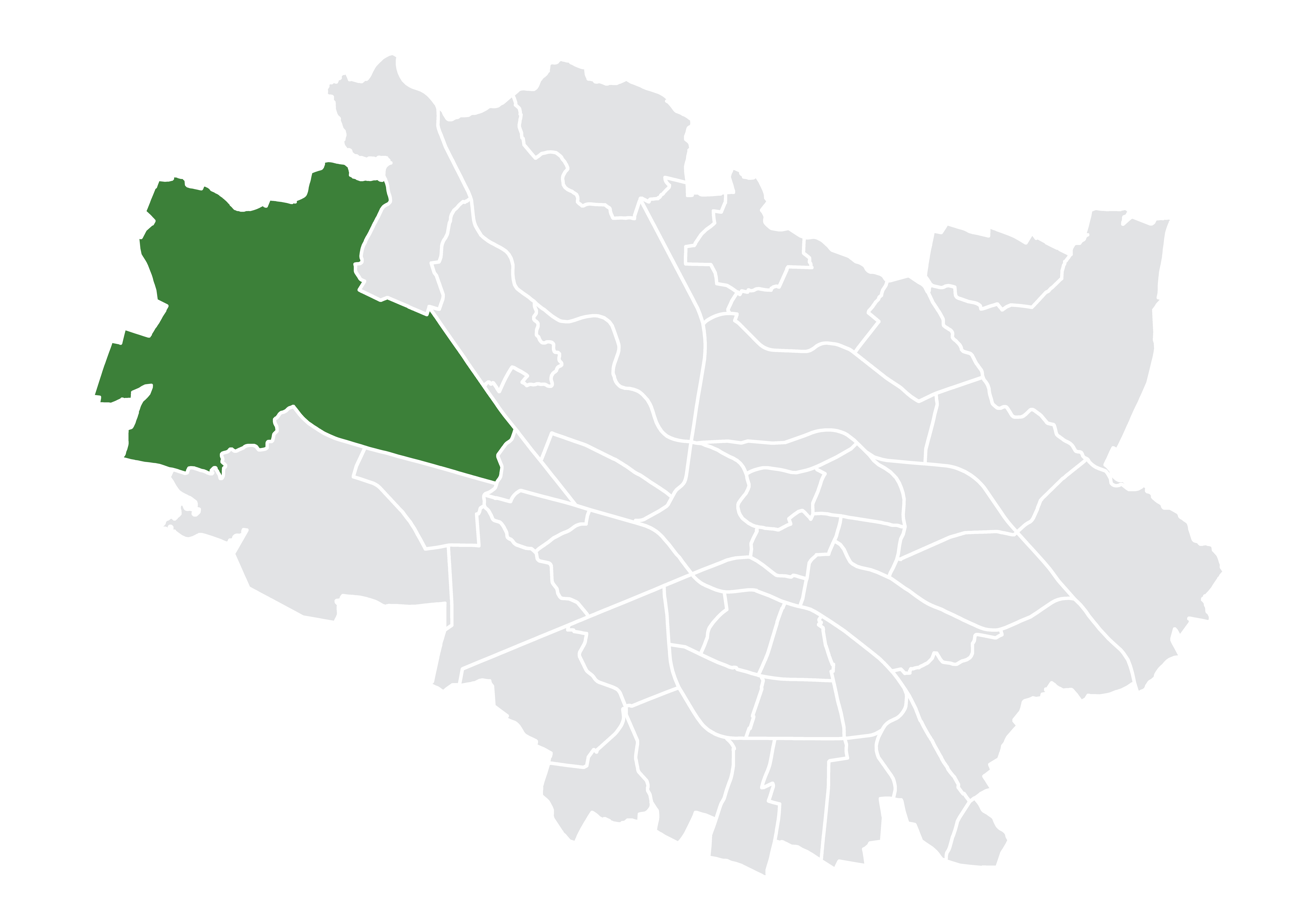
- Location of Leśnica within Wrocław
- Country: Poland
- Voivodeship: Lower Silesian
- County/City: Wrocław
- First mentioned: 1201
- Incorporated into the city: 1928
- Established the modern-day district: 1991

Population (2022)
  - Total: 31,971
- Time zone: UTC+1 (CET)
  - Summer (DST): UTC+2 (CEST)
- Area code: +48 71
- Website: lesnica.org

Leśnica (Polish pronunciation: [lɛɕˈɲit͡sa], German: Lissa (Note: Also called Deutsch Lissa as opposed to Polnisch Lissa.), [ˈlɪsa]) is a district in Wrocław, Poland, located in the western part of the city. It was established in the territory of the former Fabryczna district.

== Name ==
In a medieval document written in Latin and issued in Wrocław in 1266, which was signed by Silesian Duke Henry III the White, the village is listed under the name Lesnitz.

Since the German name Lissa was also carried by Leszno, Leśnica was referred to as Deutsch Lissa as opposed to Polnisch Lissa.

== History ==
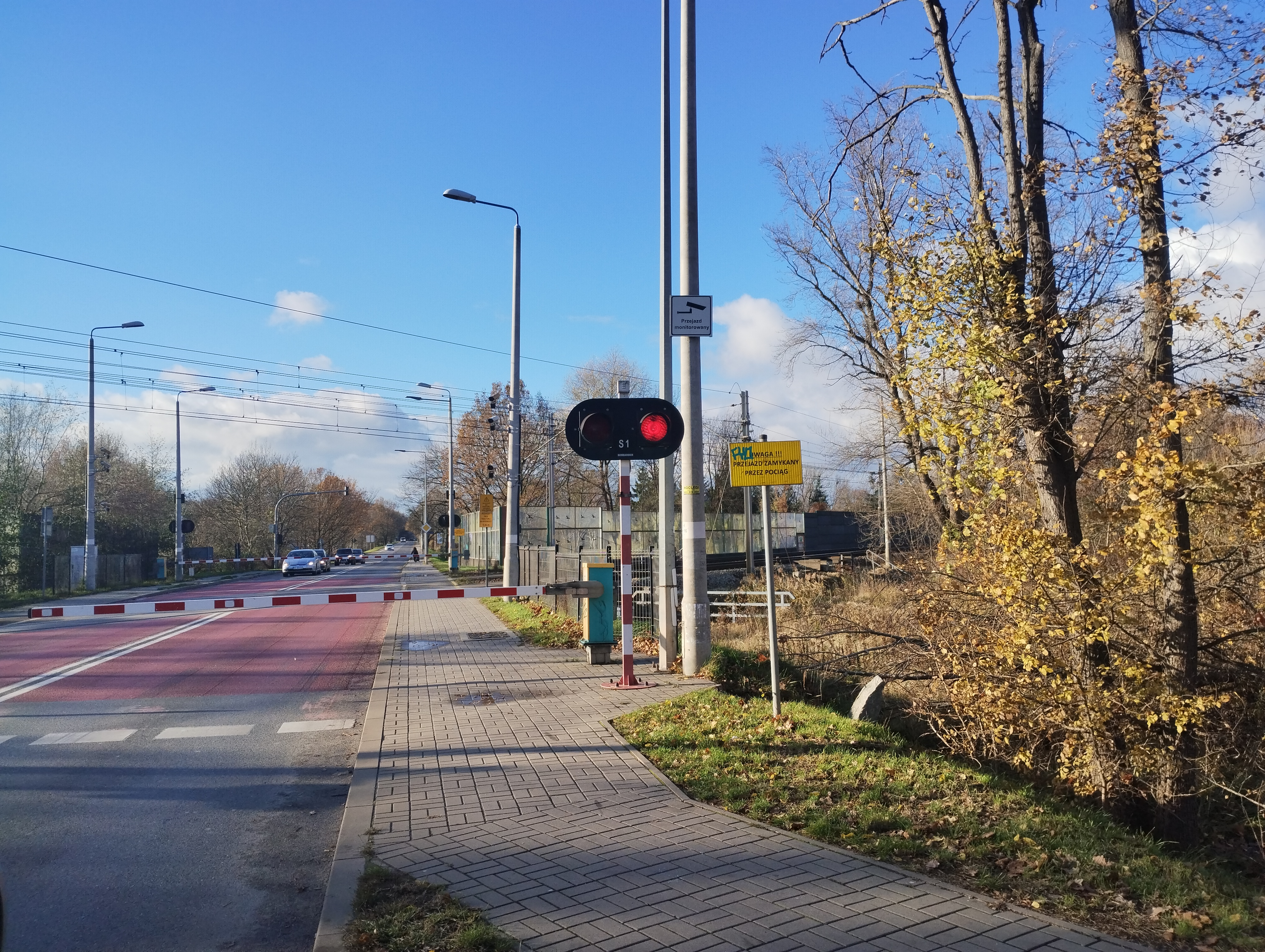
National road 94 in Leśnica

Leśnica was first mentioned in 1201, when it was part of medieval Piast-ruled Poland, although it was founded earlier with a stronghold and castle of the Piast dukes built in the 12th century. Duke Bolesław I the Tall died in the castle in 1201. Leśnica was granted a town charter in 1261, which was degraded before 1700.

The settlement was incorporated into Breslau (today's Wrocław) in 1928.

During World War II, Nazi Germany operated a subcamp of the Gross-Rosen concentration camp in the district, in which mostly Poles were imprisoned, but also some Ukrainians, Russians, Germans, Frenchmen, Czechs, Yugoslavs, and a forced labour subcamp of the city's juvenile prison. The still living prisoners of the subcamp of Gross-Rosen were evacuated to the main camp in a death march in January 1945.

In 1991, after reforms in the administrative division of Wrocław, Leśnica became one of the city's 48 districts.
