= Lipa Piotrowska =

District in Wrocław, Poland

- District of Wrocław
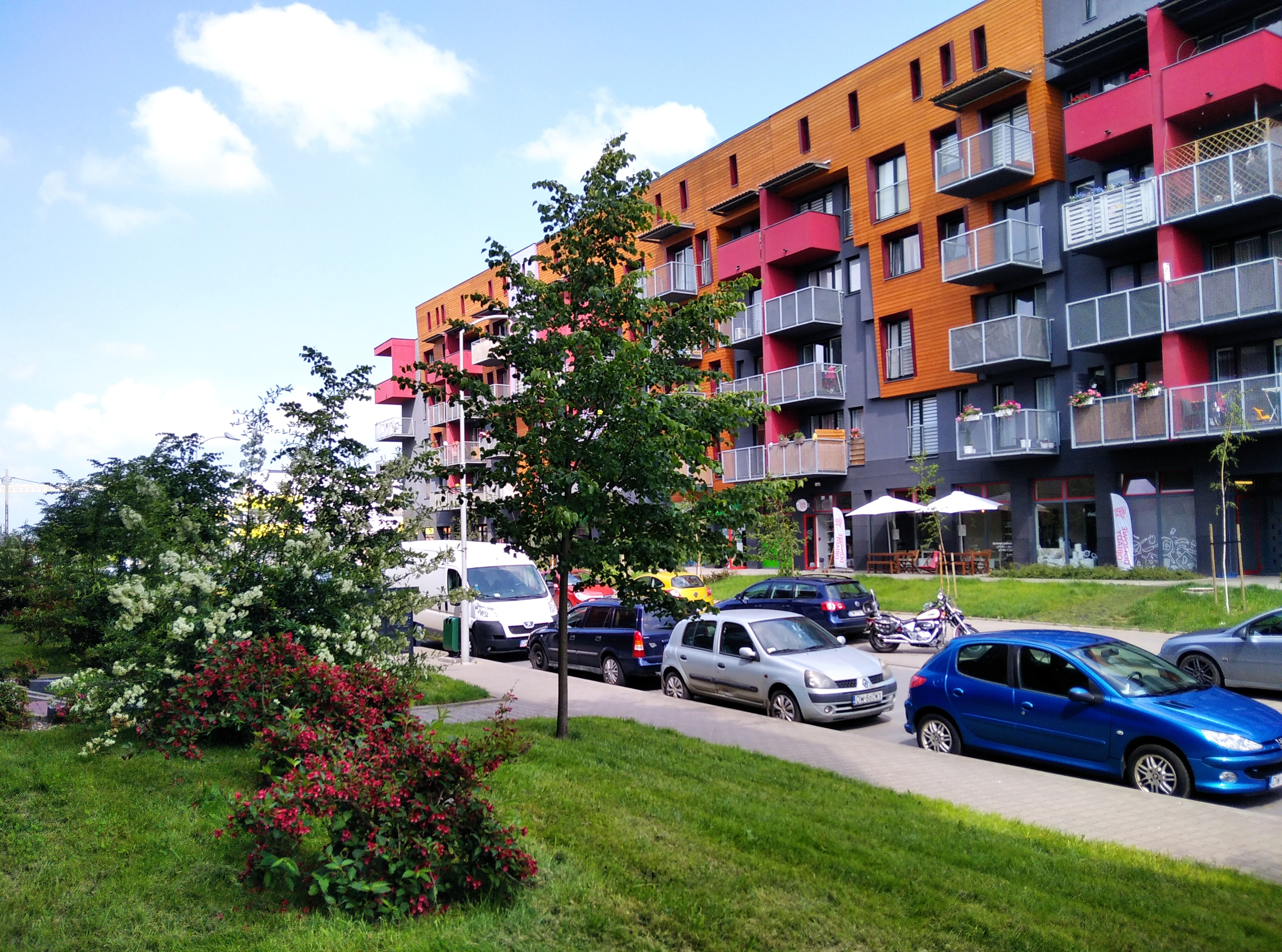

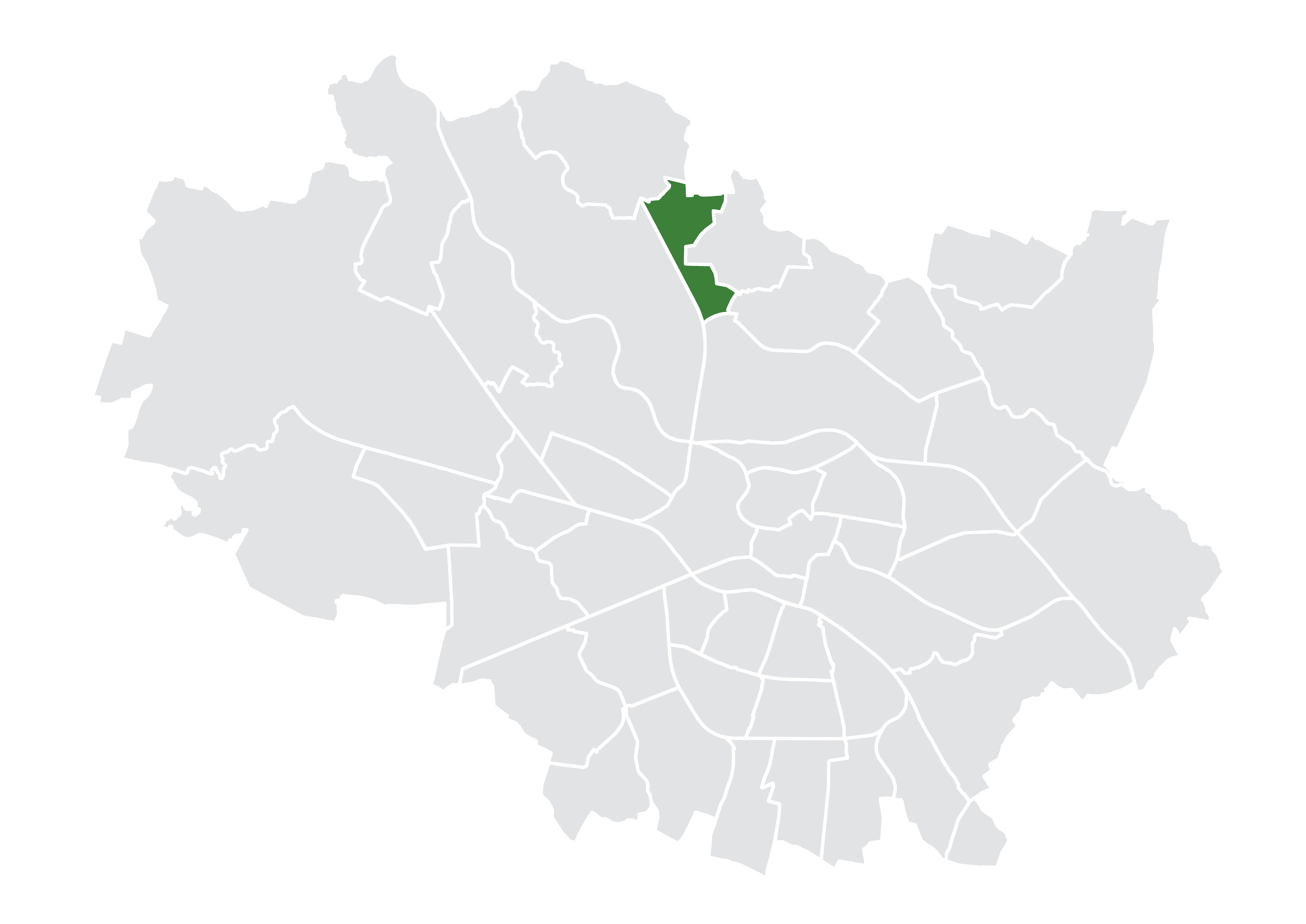
- Location of Lipa Piotrowska within Wrocław
- Country: Poland
- Voivodeship: Lower Silesian
- County/City: Wrocław
- Incorporated into the city: 1973
- Established the modern-day district: 1991

Population (2022)
  - Total: 4,170
- Time zone: UTC+1 (CET)
  - Summer (DST): UTC+2 (CEST)
- Area code: +48 71
- Website: Osiedle Lipa Piotrowska

Lipa Piotrowska (Polish: [ˈlipa pjɔtˈrɔfska]; German: Leipe-Petersdorf [ˈlaɪpə ˈpeːtɐsdɔʁf]) is a district in Wrocław, Poland, located in the northern part of the city. It was established in the territory of the former Psie Pole district.

The settlement was incorporated into Wrocław in 1973. In 1991, after reforms in the administrative division of Wrocław, Lipa Piotrowska became one of the city's 48 districts.

== Background ==
Lipa Piotrowska is situated in the northern part of the right bank of Wrocław. On the northeast it borders the village of Szymanów. On the other sides it borders other Wrocław neighborhoods – Widawa and Poświętne to the east, Różanka and Osobowice to the south, Rędzin to the west, and Świniary to the northwest.
