= Karłowice-Różanka =

District in Wrocław, Poland

- District of Wrocław
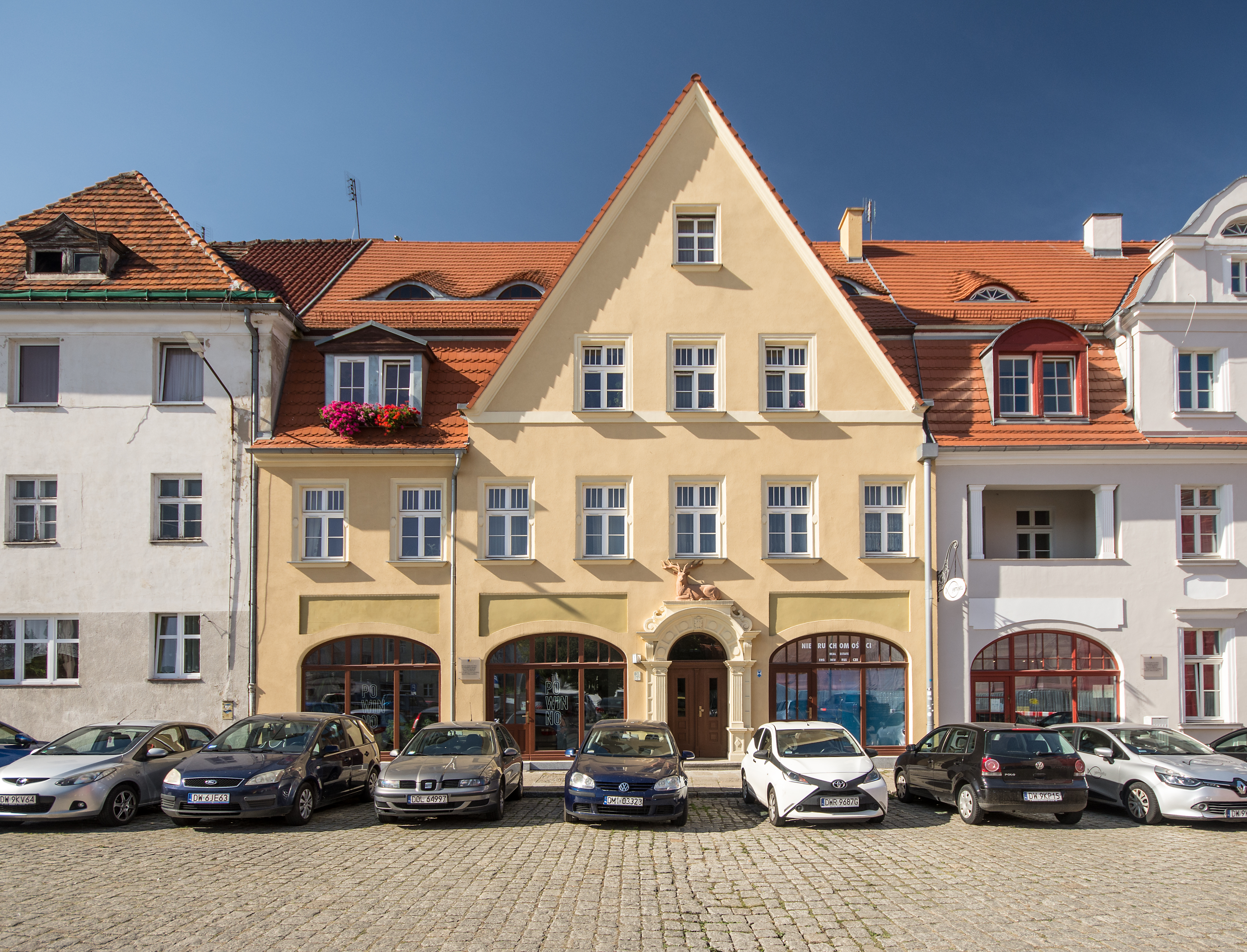
- Plac Józefa Piłsudskiego

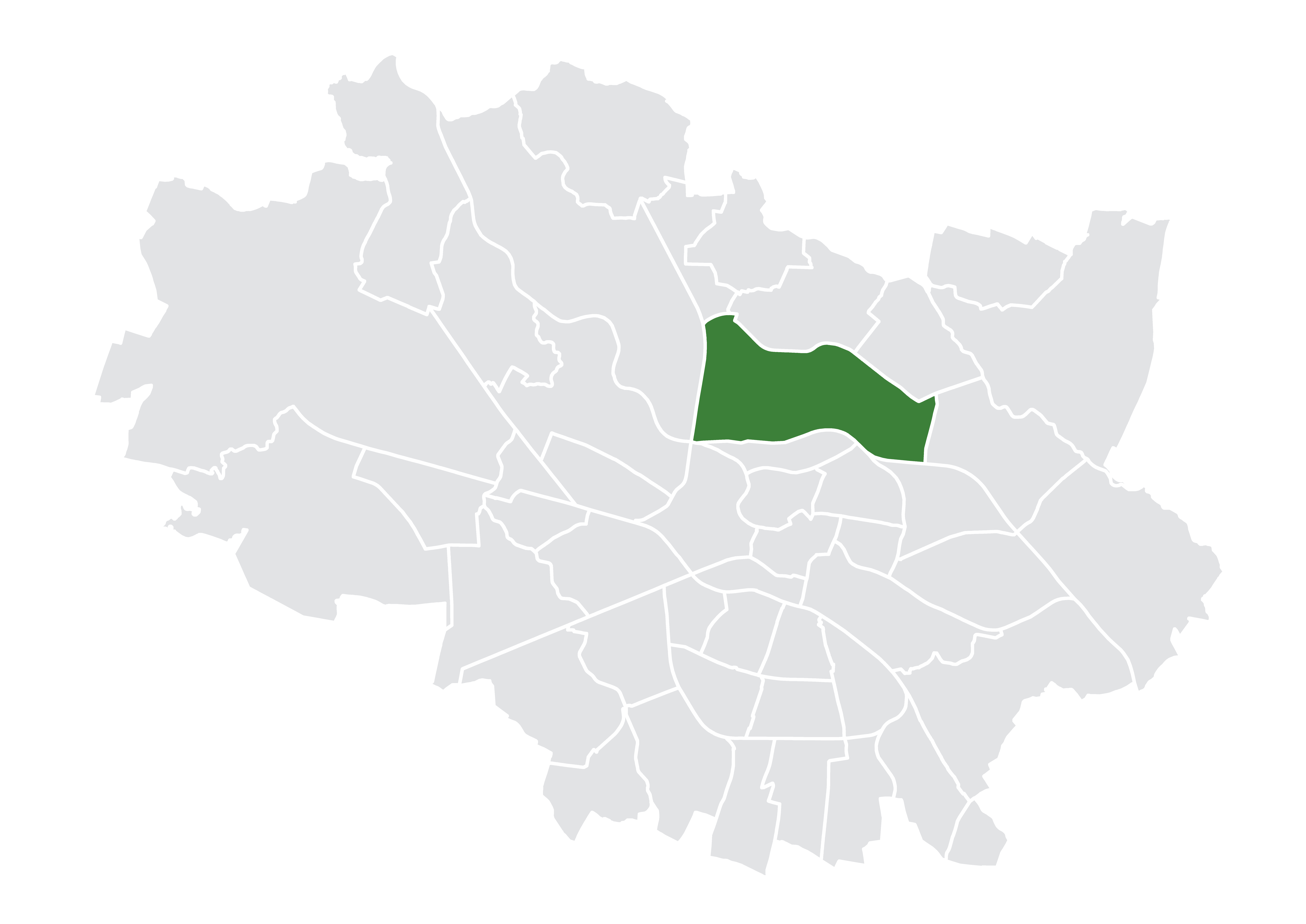
- Location of the district within Wrocław
- Country: Poland
- Voivodeship: Lower Silesian
- County/City: Wrocław
- Established: 1991

Population (2022)
  - Total: 31,813
- Time zone: UTC+1 (CET)
  - Summer (DST): UTC+2 (CEST)
- Area code: +48 71
- Website: Osiedle Karłowice-Różanka

Karłowice-Różanka (Polish pronunciation: [karwɔˈvit͡sɛ ruˈʐaŋka]) is a district in Wrocław, Poland, located in the northern part of the city. It was established in the territory of the former Psie Pole district.

== Background ==
The district includes the area of the neighborhoods of Karłowice, Różanka, Mirowiec and Polanka. Its neighboring districts are Lipa Piotrowska, Polanowice-Poświętne-Ligota, Sołtysowice, Kowale, Zacisze-Zalesie-Szczytniki, Ołbin, Kleczków, and Szczepin.

In 1991, after reforms in the administrative division of Wrocław, Karłowice-Różanka became one of the city's 48 districts.

== History ==
During Nazi German rule and World War II, a forced labour subcamp of the city's juvenile prison was operated in Karłowice.
