= Osobowice-Rędzin =

District in Wrocław, Poland

- District of Wrocław
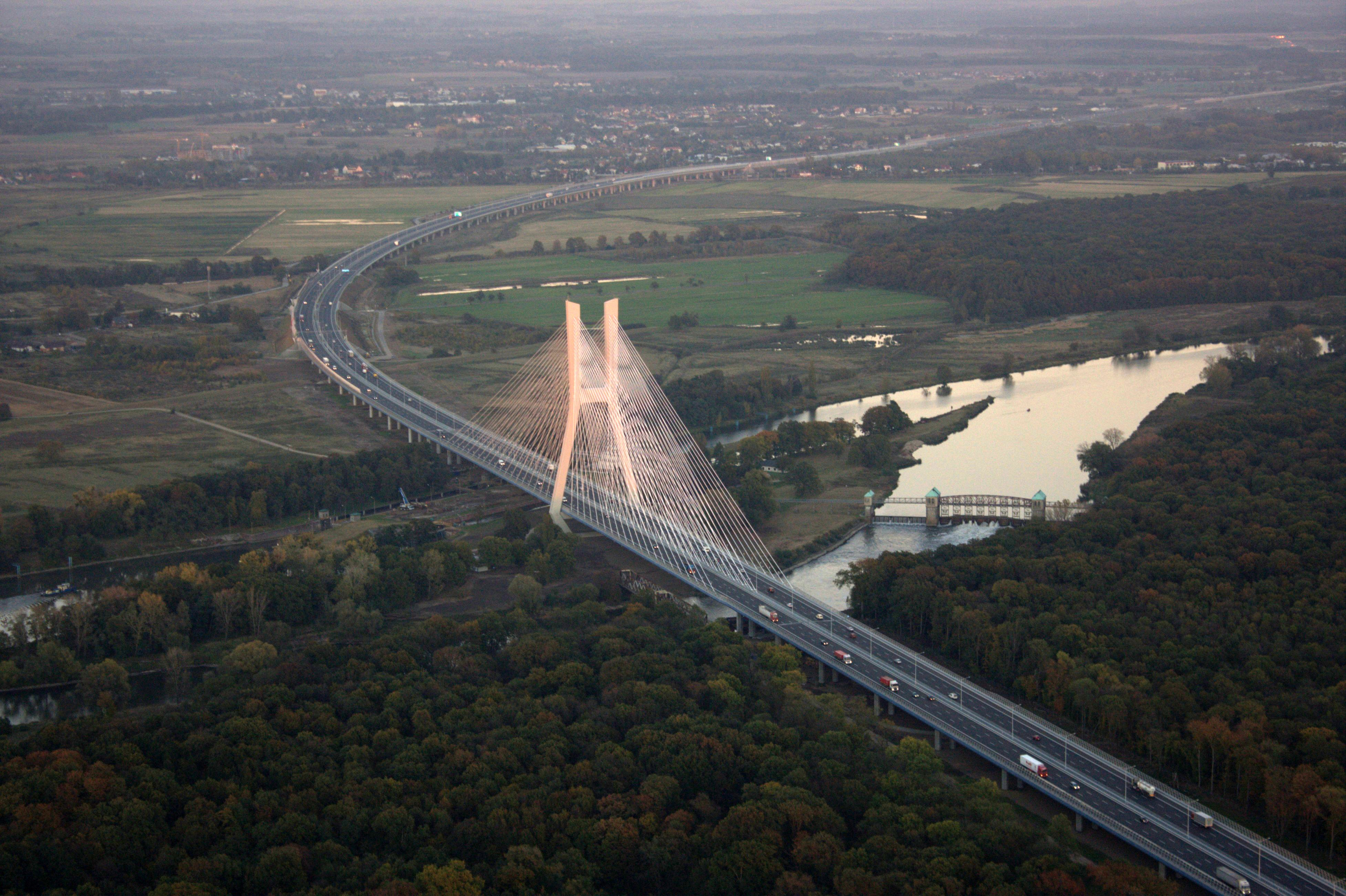
- Aerial view of the Rędziński Bridge

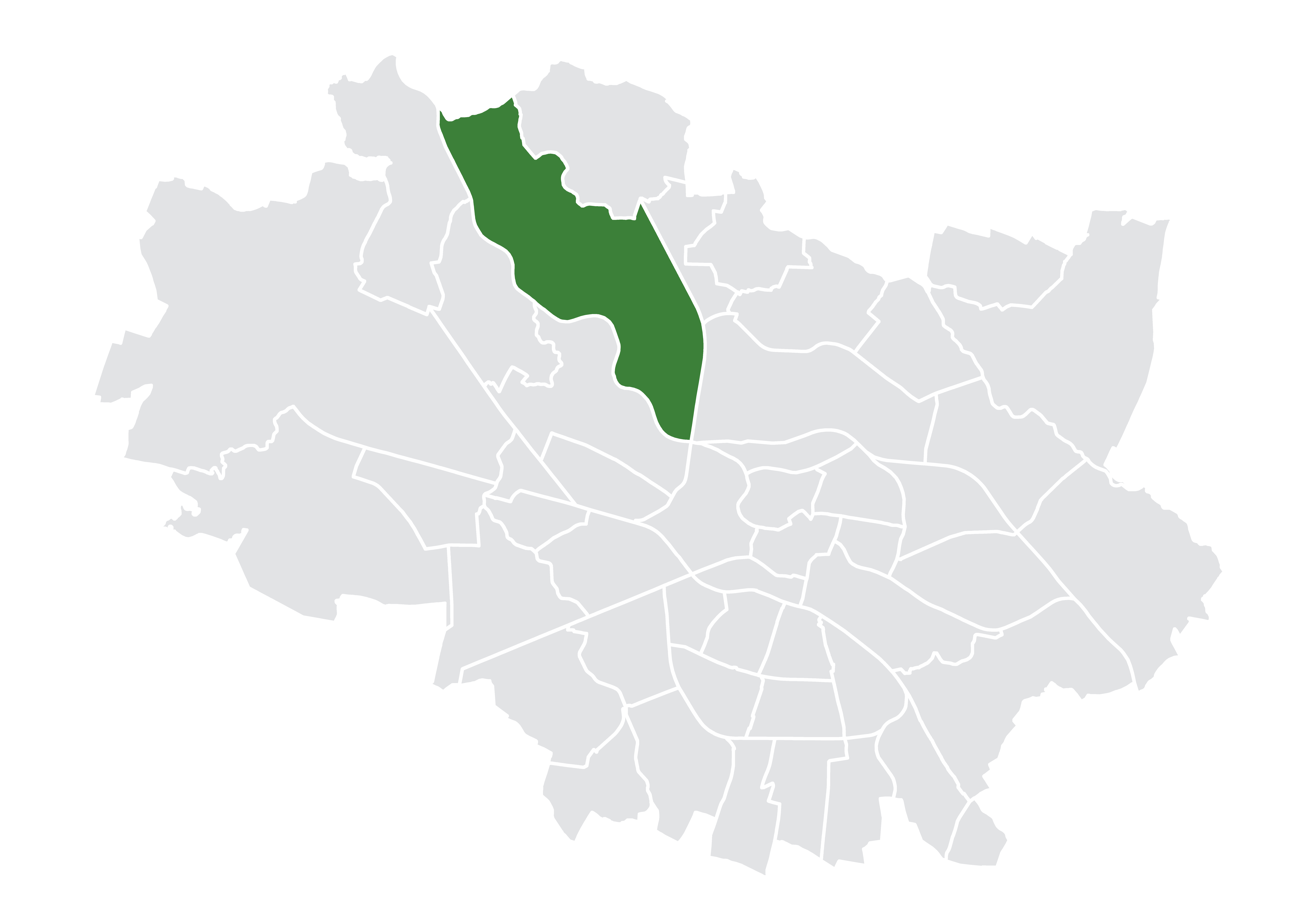
- Location of the district within Wrocław
- Country: Poland
- Voivodeship: Lower Silesian
- County/City: Wrocław
- Established: 1991

Population (2022)
  - Total: 2,966
- Time zone: UTC+1 (CET)
  - Summer (DST): UTC+2 (CEST)
- Area code: +48 71
- Website: Osiedle Osobowice-Rędzin

Osobowice-Rędzin (Polish pronunciation: [ɔsɔbɔˈvit͡sɛ ˈrɛɲd͡ʑin]) is a district in Wrocław, Poland, located in the northern part of the city. It was established in the territory of the former Psie Pole district. It consists of Osobowice, incorporated into the city in 1928, and Rędzin, incorporated in 1973. Much of the district's area is occupied by the former septic drain fields of the Wrocław sewage treatment plant.

Osobowice-Rędzin is adjacent to the districts of Świniary, Lipa Piotrowska, Karłowice-Różanka, Pilczyce-Kozanów-Popowice Północne, Maślice, and Pracze Odrzańskie. Outside of the city, it borders Gmina Oborniki Śląskie.

In 1991, after reforms in the administrative division of Wrocław, Osobowice-Rędzin became one of the city's 48 districts.
