= Stolberg Palace =

Palace in Świniary, Wrocław, Poland

Coordinates: 51.1983°N 16.9800°E

- Pałac Stolbergów
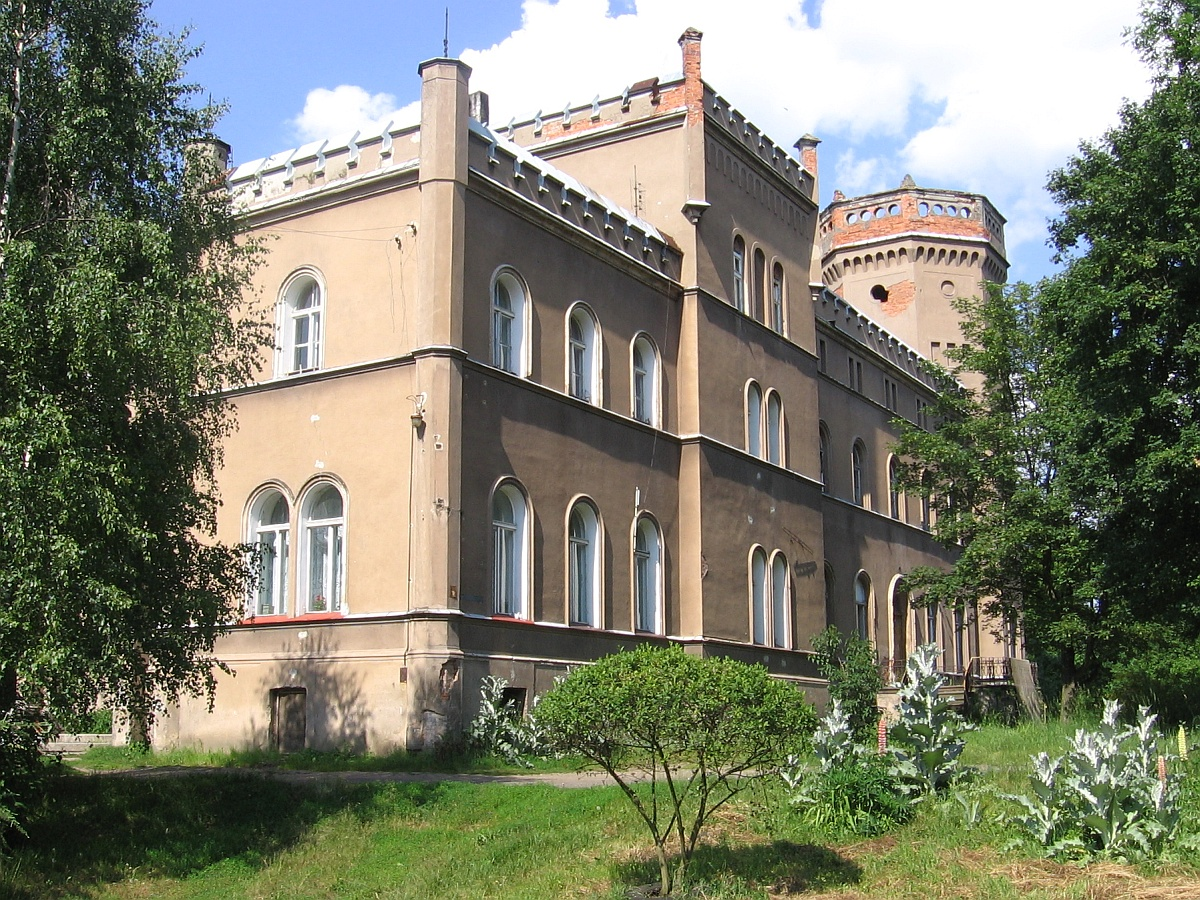
- Interactive map of the Stolberg Palace area

General information
- Type: Palace
- Architectural style: Florentine Neo-Gothic
- Construction started: 1845
- Destroyed: 2024

Technical details
- Floor count: Three
- Floor area: 757 sq m

Design and construction
- Architect: Ferdinand Fleischinger

Stolberg Palace (Polish: Pałac Stolbergów) is a historic palace in Świniary, Wrocław, Poland.

== History ==
The palace in the Florentine neo-Gothic style was built in 1845 on the site of a former medieval stronghold, between the Widawa River, which was filled in during the 20th century, and its side branch, the Młynówka. Its founder was Count Bernhard Joseph von Stolberg-Stolberg (1803–1859), son of Friedrich Leopold zu Stolberg and Sophie Charlotte Eleonore von Redern. The palace was designed by Ferdinand Fleischinger in a "U" shape; it had three wings, was three stories high, and had two massive towers with battlements and flat roofs at the corners of the front wing. In later years, another owner of the palace, Count Arthur von Henckel-Donnersmarck (1836–1921) from the Carinthian line in Wolfsberg, added another floor to the west wing according to the design of Carl Lüdecke, maintaining the building's stylistic coherence.

In 1895, the palace was purchased by the Wrocław city council, and in 1897 it was adapted into a convalescent center. During this time, installations and staircases were among the elements that were changed. The designers of these changes were Richard Plüddemann and Friedrich Friese. The entire palace and park complex covered an area of 3.5 hectares.

=== After 1945 ===
After World War II, the estate was transformed into a state farm, and employees were accommodated in the palace. In 2020, the palace together with the entire palace and park complex covering 3.5 hectares was put up for sale for a starting price of 4,696,000 złoty. Currently, the owner is the National Center for Agricultural Support, Field Branch in Wrocław.

On June 16, 2024, there was a fire in the palace, as a result of which the interior of the building burned completely. Only the external walls survived.
