= Psie Pole =

Former borough in Wrocław, Poland

- Former borough of Wrocław
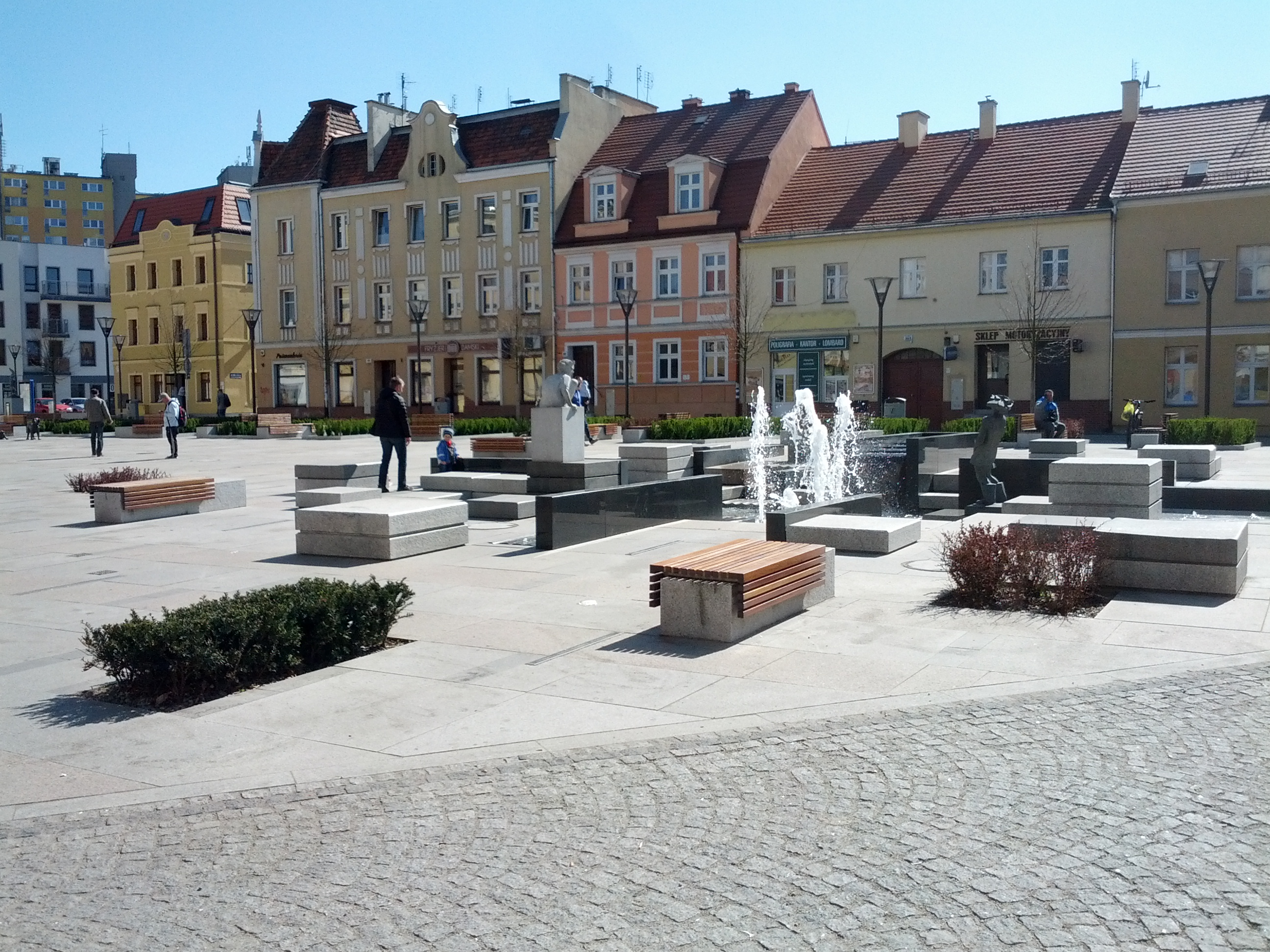

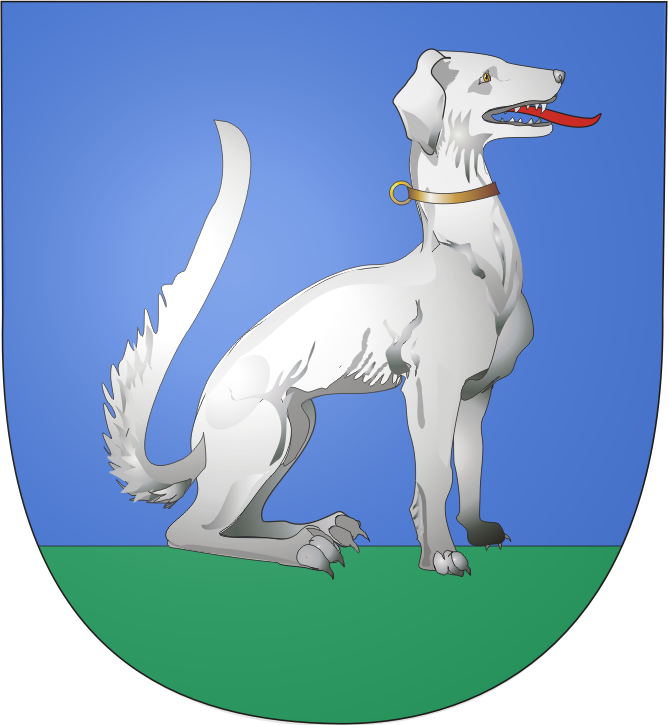
- Coat of arms

- Location of Psie Pole within Wrocław
- Country: Poland
- Voivodeship: Lower Silesian
- County/City: Wrocław
- Established: 1952
- Dissolved: 1990

Population (2022)
  - Total: 95,615
- Time zone: UTC+1 (CET)
  - Summer (DST): UTC+2 (CEST)
- Area code: +48 71

Psie Pole (Polish pronunciation: [pɕɛ ˈpɔlɛ], German: Hundsfeld, [ˈhʊntsfɛlt]), lit. 'Dog Field', is a former dzielnica (city district) of Wrocław, Poland, located in the north-eastern part of the city.

Before 1928, it used to be an independent town. On March 21, 1991, the newly created City Office of Wrocław assumed many of the functions previously carried out within the borough. The name, though, remained in use, mainly for statistical and administrative purposes.

It lies in the city's northern and northeastern parts, on the right shore of the Oder River. A part of Psie Pole is one of Wrocław's greenest neighborhoods, and its suburban location makes it an important transport hub toward Warsaw, Łódź and other locations in central Poland.

The Polish General Tadeusz Kościuszko Military University of Land Forces is located in Psie Pole.

== Subdivision ==
Since 1991, Psie Pole has been divided into 11 districts:

- Karłowice-Różanka
- Kowale
- Strachocin-Swojczyce-Wojnów
- Psie Pole-Zawidawie
- Pawłowice
- Sołtysowice
- Polanowice-Poświętne-Ligota
- Widawa
- Lipa Piotrowska
- Świniary
- Osobowice-Rędzin

== History ==
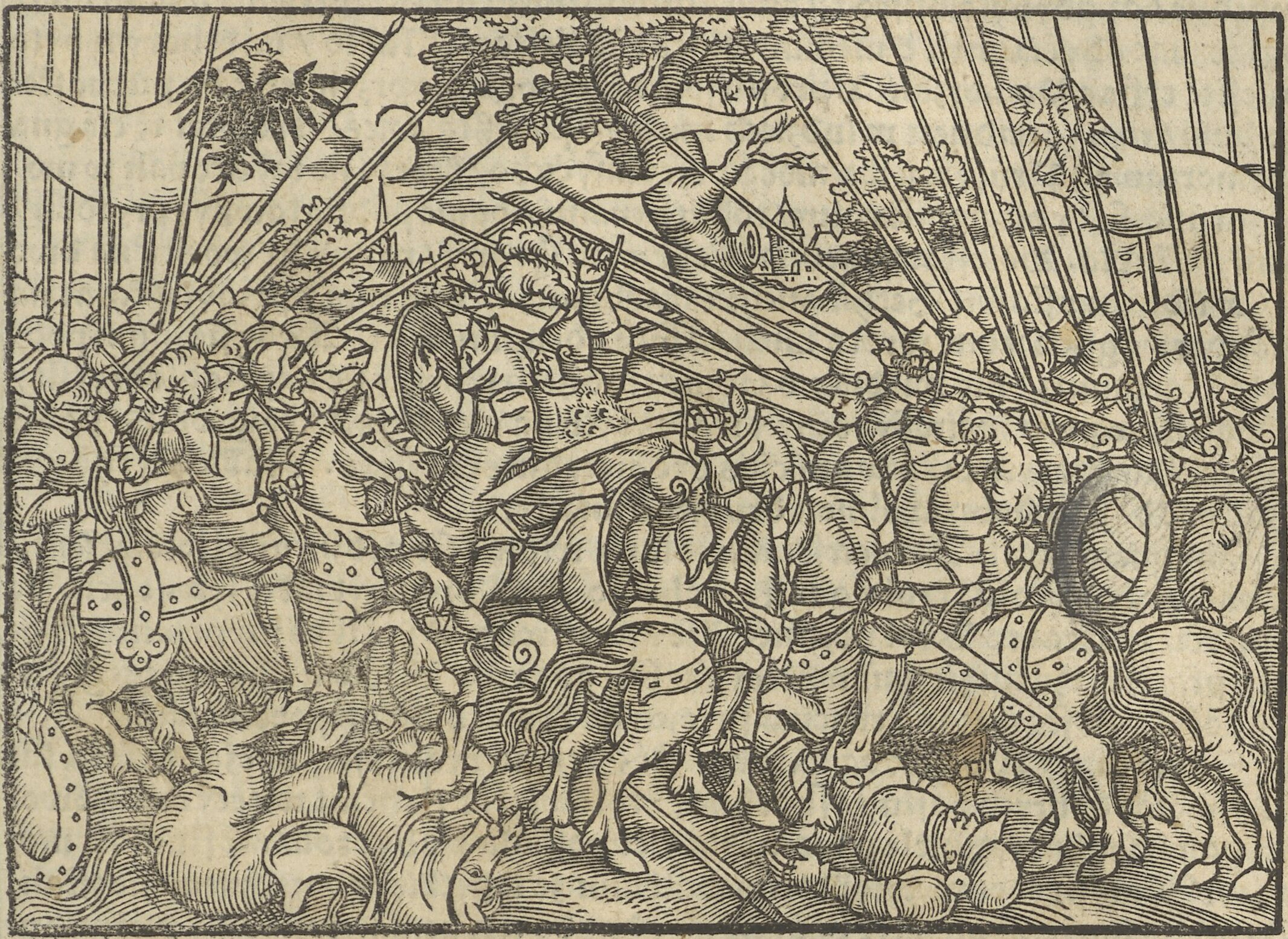
Battle of Psie Pole, 16th-century woodcut by Marcin Bielski

Psie Pole is considered to be the site of the 1109 Battle of Hundsfeld between the Poles and the Germans, although the existence of this battle is doubted by historians because it was not mentioned until a century later.

The local parish church of Saints James and Christopher dates back to the early 13th century, and the settlement was mentioned in medieval Polish documents under its Old Polish name Pzepole (1206) and Psepole (1266).

During World War II, the nazi regime established and operated a female subcamp of the Gross-Rosen concentration camp in the district.

== Gallery ==
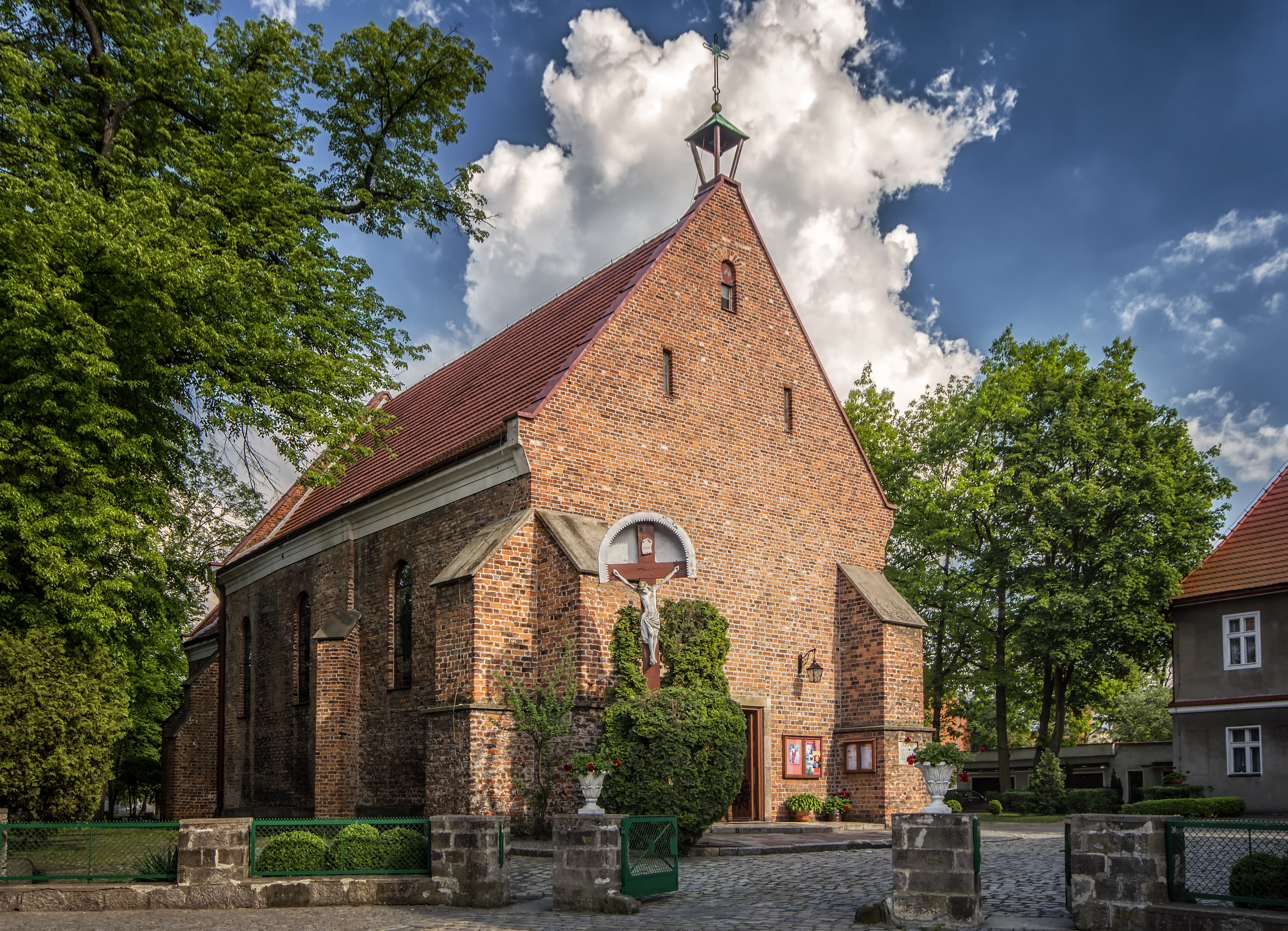
Gothic Saints James and Christopher church

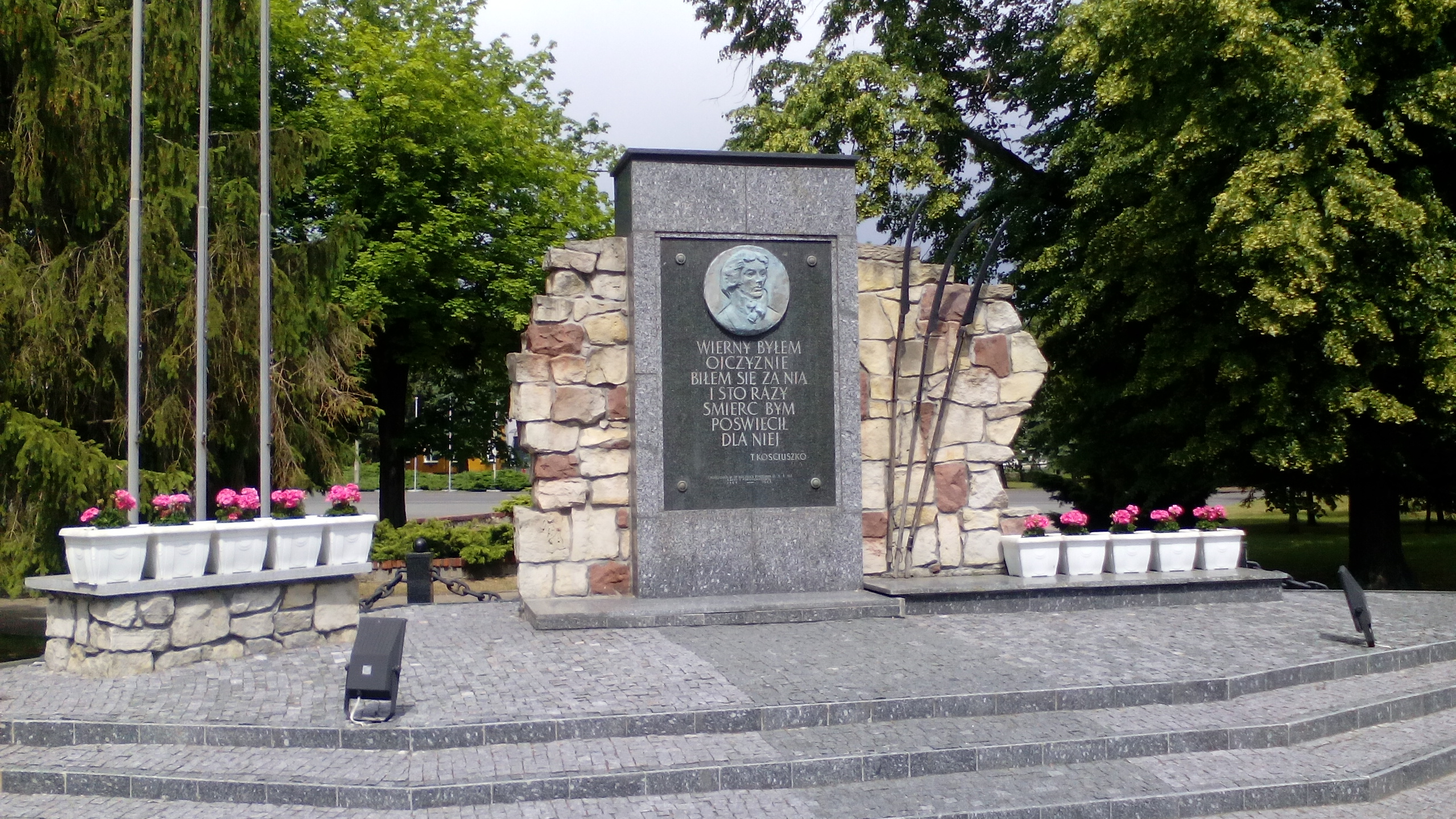
Monument to Tadeusz Kościuszko

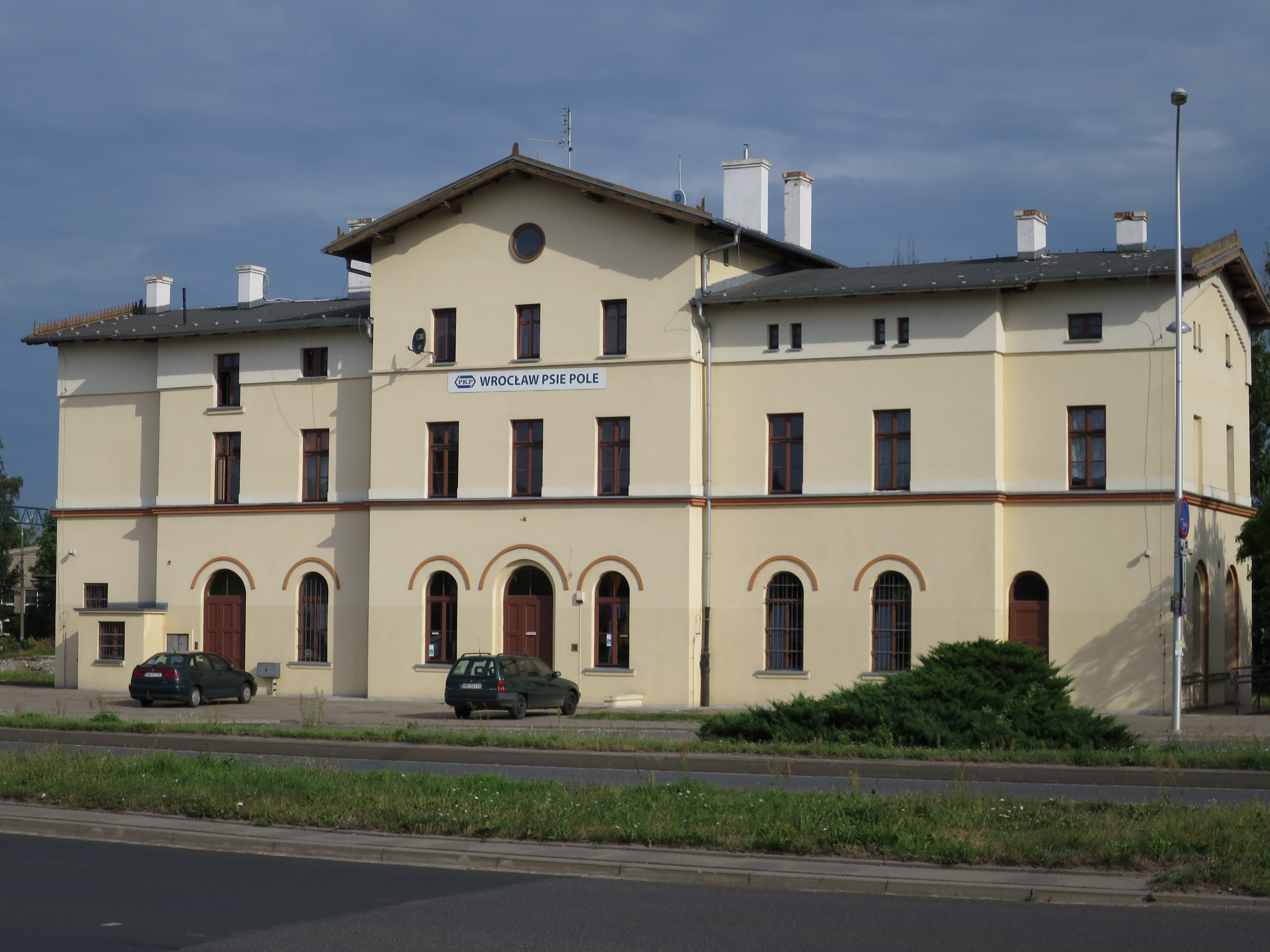
Wrocław Psie Pole train station

== See also ==
- Districts of Wrocław
