= Battle of Hundsfeld =

1109 battle in Central Europe

Battle of Hundsfeld German: Schlacht von Hundsfeld Polish: Bitwa na Psim Polu
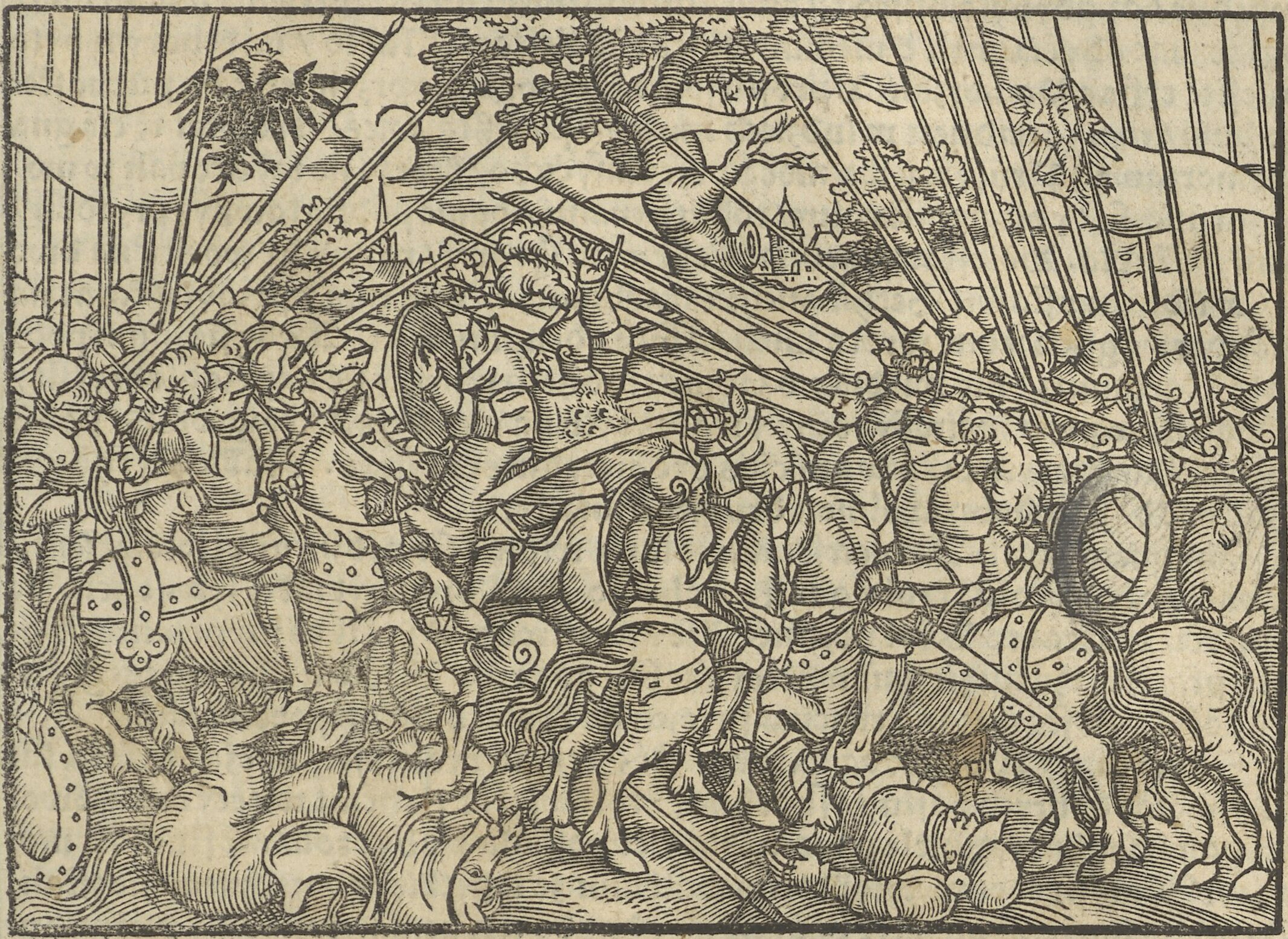
- Woodcut from Kronika Polska by Marcin Bielski, 1564
Date	August 24, 1109
Location	Hundsfeld (Psie Pole) near Wrocław in Silesia, Poland (now in the neighborhood Psie Pole-Zawidawie of Wrocław)
Result	Polish victory

Belligerents
Kingdom of Poland	Holy Roman Empire

Commanders and leaders
Bolesław III Wrymouth	Henry V of Germany

The Battle of Hundsfeld or Battle of Psie Pole was said to be fought on 24 August 1109 near the Silesian capital Wrocław between the Holy Roman Empire in aid of the claims of the exiled Piast duke Zbigniew against his ruling half-brother, Bolesław III Wrymouth of Poland. It was recorded by the medieval Polish chronicler Bishop Wincenty Kadłubek of Kraków in his Chronica seu originale regum et principum Poloniae several decades later.

== History ==
The contemporary author Gallus Anonymus in his Gesta principum Polonorum, written between 1112 and 1118, mentioned several armed encounters with the Imperial forces led by King Henry V of Germany. After Bolesław III had invaded the Bohemian territory of Duke Svatopluk, the German king in turn started a campaign in Poland and laid siege to the towns of Bytom Odrzański and Głogów, before he moved further down the Oder River and marched against Wrocław, though to no avail, after being defeated at the Battle of Hundsfeld by Bolesław's forces.

== Debate ==
According to Wincenty Kadłubek, the Germans were ambushed by the Polish forces and the result was a complete victory of Bolesław III Wrymouth, whereafter King Henry withdrew from Poland. After the encounter, due to the many dead and dying left on the battlefield; Kadłubek remarked, that the "...dogs which, devouring so many corpses, fell into a mad ferocity, so that no one dared venture there." Hence, the site became known as "dogs' field" (Polish: Psie Pole, German: Hundsfeld).

Kadłubek's relation was questioned in the late 19th century Encyklopedia Powszechna by Samuel Orgelbrand. Present-day historians are split on the issue, with some arguing that the battle was rather an unimportant skirmish, and the Chronica, written at the court of Bolesław's son Casimir II the Just almost hundred years after the event, is not fully reliable. Though, regardless of the magnitude, the clash contributed to Henry V's retreat.

== Tradition ==
The site is now part of the Psie Pole district of modern Wrocław. The name was also given by General Stanislaw Maczek during WWII to an area where a mile-long column of German panzers was destroyed at Hill 262, during the Battle of Falaise in Normandy.

== See also ==
- History of Poland during the Piast dynasty
