= Kowale, Wrocław =

District in Wrocław, Poland

Kowale
- District of Wrocław
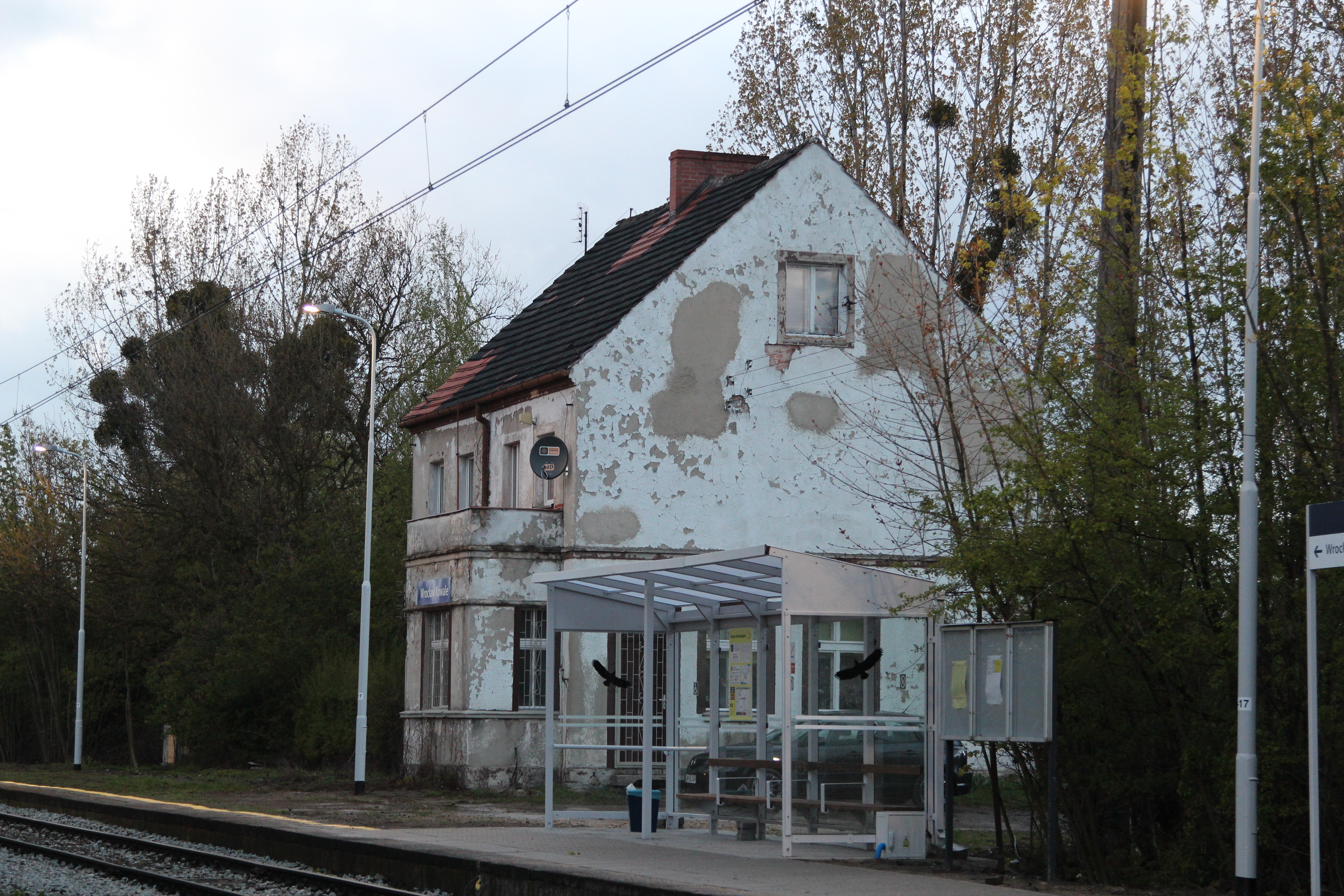

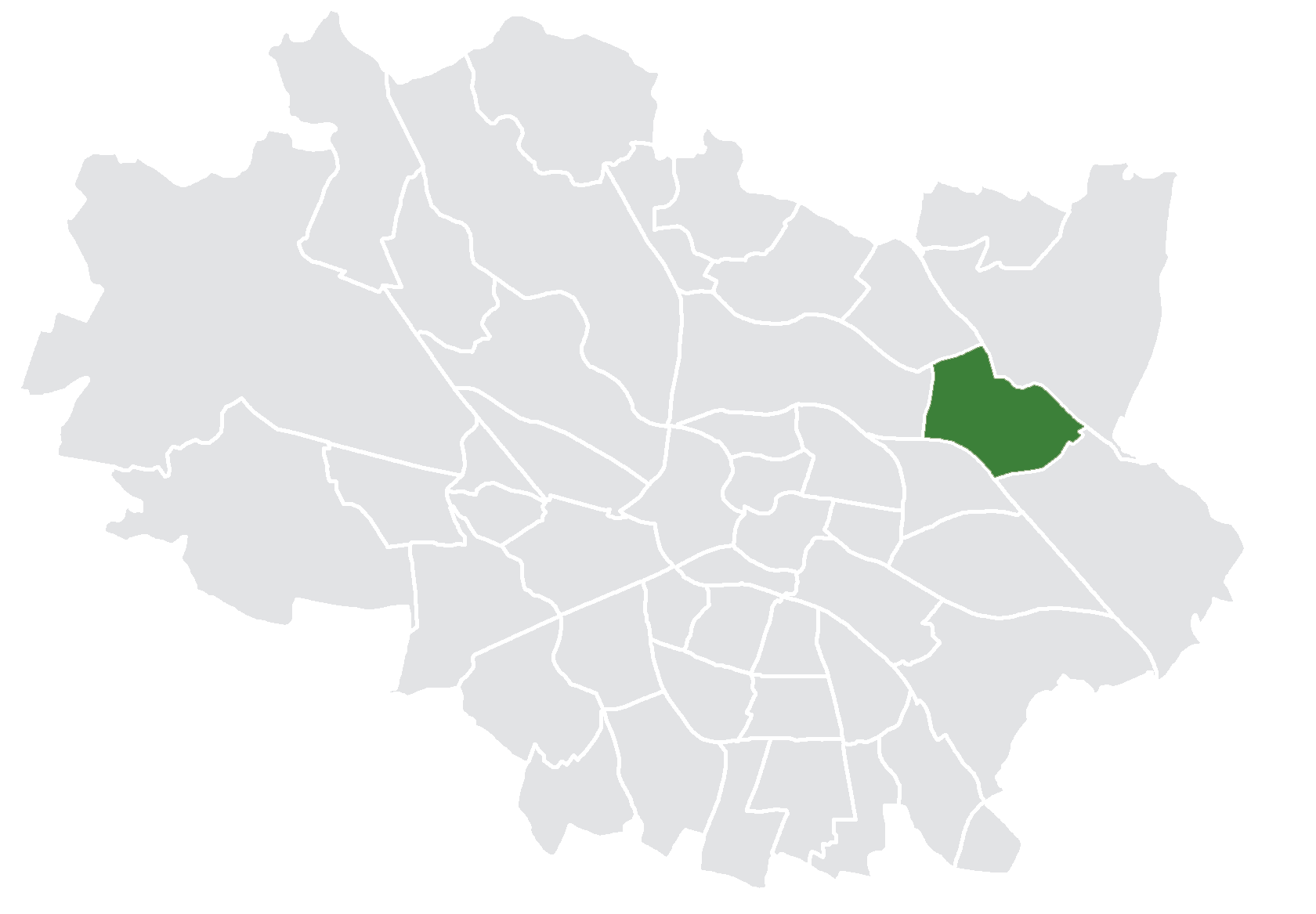
- Location of Kowale within Wrocław
- Country: Poland
- Voivodeship: Lower Silesian
- County/City: Wrocław
- Incorporated into the city: 1928
- Established the modern-day district: 1991

Population (2022)
  - Total: 12,793
- Time zone: UTC+1 (CET)
  - Summer (DST): UTC+2 (CEST)
- Area code: +48 71
- Website: kowale.wroclaw.pl

Kowale (Polish pronunciation: [kɔˈvalɛ], German: Cawallen, [ˈkavalən]) is a district in Wrocław located in the north-eastern part of the city. It was established in the territory of the former Psie Pole district.

== Name ==
The name of the village derives from the Polish word 'kowal' ('smith'). Heinrich Adamy, in his work on local names in Silesia published in 1888 in Breslau, lists the Polish form Kowalowice as the original recorded name of the locality, giving its meaning as Schmiededorf ('smith village').

The name was phonetically Germanized to Cawallen, losing its original meaning.

== History ==
Initially a village, the settlement was incorporated into Breslau (today's Wrocław) in 1928.

In 1991, after reforms in the administrative division of Wrocław, Kowale became one of the city's 48 districts.
