= Sołtysowice =

District in Wrocław, Poland

- District of Wrocław
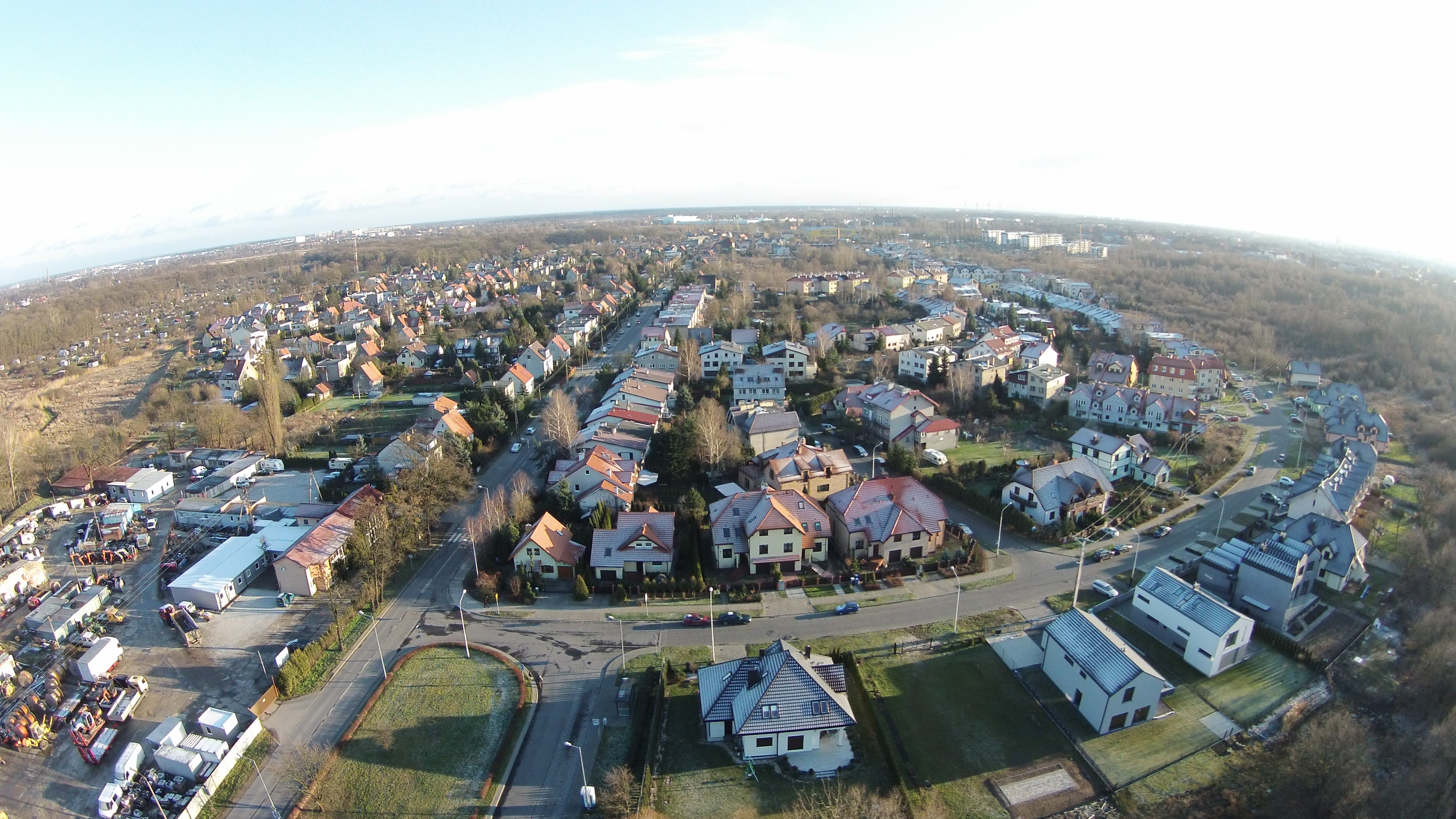

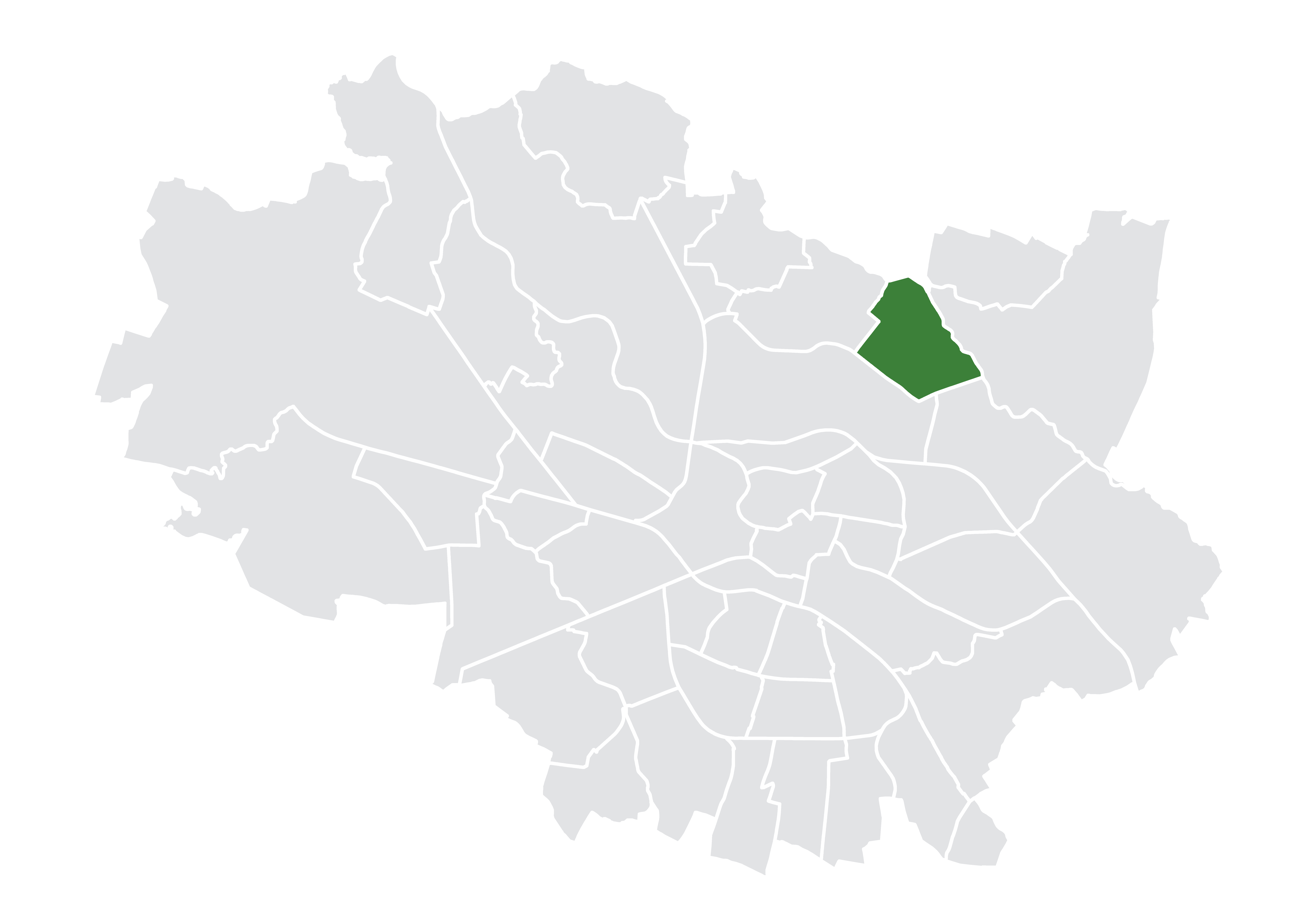
- Location of Sołtysowice within Wrocław
- Country: Poland
- Voivodeship: Lower Silesian
- County/City: Wrocław
- First mentioned: 1312
- Incorporated into the city: 1951
- Established the modern-day district: 1991

Population (2026)
  - Total: 5,030
- Time zone: UTC+1 (CET)
  - Summer (DST): UTC+2 (CEST)
- Area code: +48 71
- Website: Osiedle Sołtysowice

Sołtysowice (Polish pronunciation: [sɔwtɨsɔˈvit͡sɛ], German: Schottwitz, [ˈʃɔtvɪt͡s]) is a district in Wrocław located in the north-eastern part of the city. It was established in the territory of the former Psie Pole district.

Initially a village, the settlement was incorporated into Wrocław in 1951.

== Name ==
The earliest mention of the settlement in a document dates back to 1312, when it was recorded under the name of Schultheschowycz. Later names used in documents were Schuteswicz (1326), Schulteissowicz (1340), Scholteiswicz (1353), Schulteissowitz (1411), Schultewytz (1540), Schotwitz (1652), and Burgweide (1937).

After 1945, the settlement was renamed Sułkowice. It was later changed to Sołtysowice the same year.

== History ==
Researching the local settlement showed that a Polish strongfold had existed since the 12th century. The village was first mentioned in 1312, when it was part of medieval Piast-ruled Poland. Hertelin of Głogów sold the village to the St. Vincent Monastery in Ołbin, and in 1390 the monastery bought another 3.75 acres from Jan the apothecary from Wrocław.

In 1795 the village had 157 inhabitants, including 2 craftsmen, 24 houses, a farm and an inn. At the beginning of the 19th century. Schottwitz was known for sheep and cattle breeding. In 1845 there were 227 inhabitants, most of them Catholics. There was a manor, 33 houses, an inn, a tailor, a shoemaker and a merchant, and sheep-breeding still predominated. In 1868 the Breslau-Oels (Oleśnica) railway was opened with a station in Schottwitz, which boosted the economic development in the following period. In 1890 a sugar factory was built near the station. After 1933, a branch of the Breslau Penal and Juvenile Prison was established in the village.

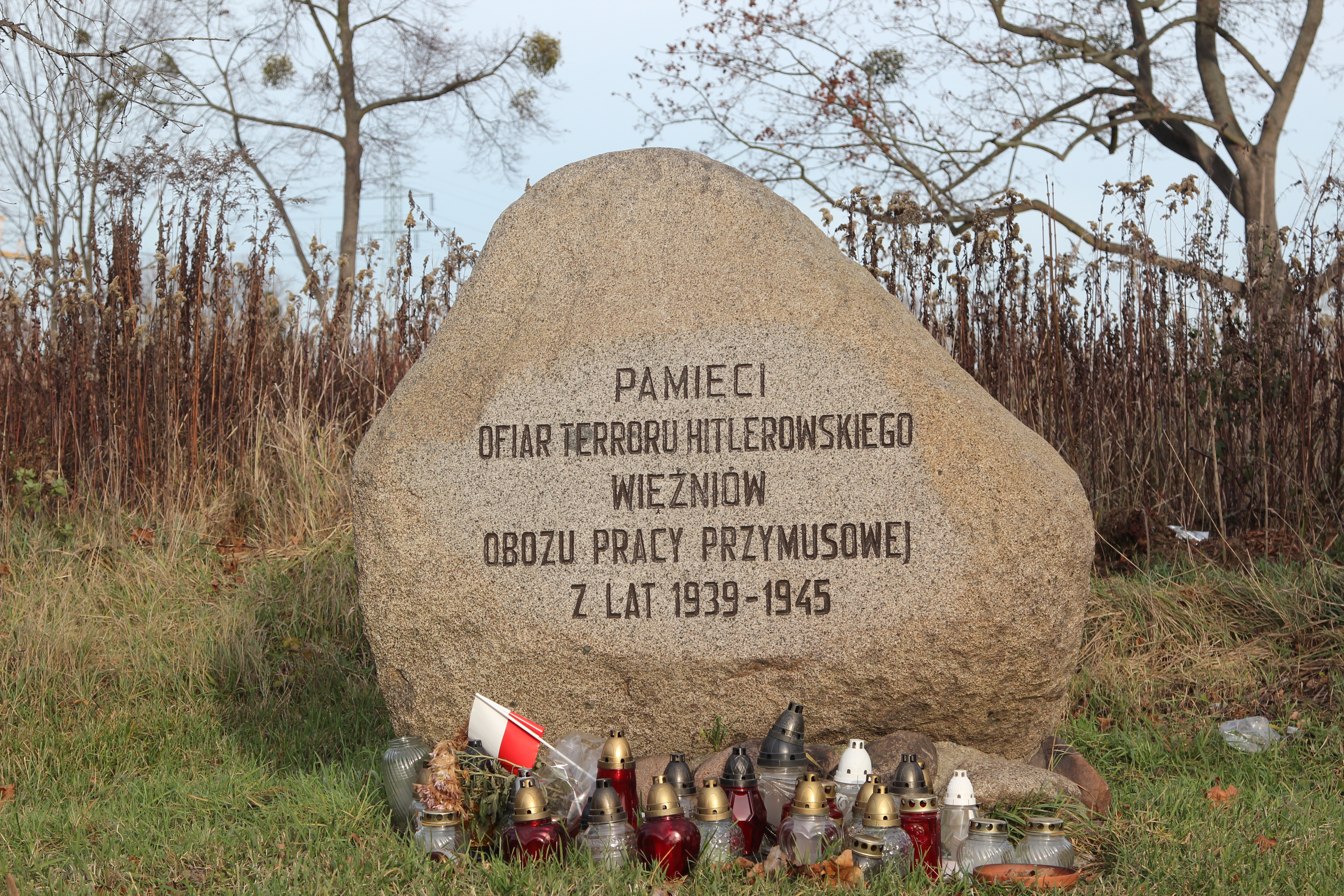
Memorial at the site of the former Nazi forced labour camp

During World War II it became a transit camp (Durchgangslager Breslau-Burgweide), through which about 10,000 prisoners passed. After the Warsaw Uprising, about 1,000 people were brought to the camp, where they stayed for several days. Today there is a memorial stone at the site of the camp.

The settlement became again a part of Poland in 1945, and was incorporated into Wrocław in 1951. In 1991, after reforms in the administrative division of Wrocław, Sołtysowice became one of the city's 48 districts.

Today, Sołtysowice is a residential area consisting mainly of single-family houses and low-rise apartment buildings.
