= Widawa, Wrocław =

District in Wrocław, Poland

Widawa
- District of Wrocław
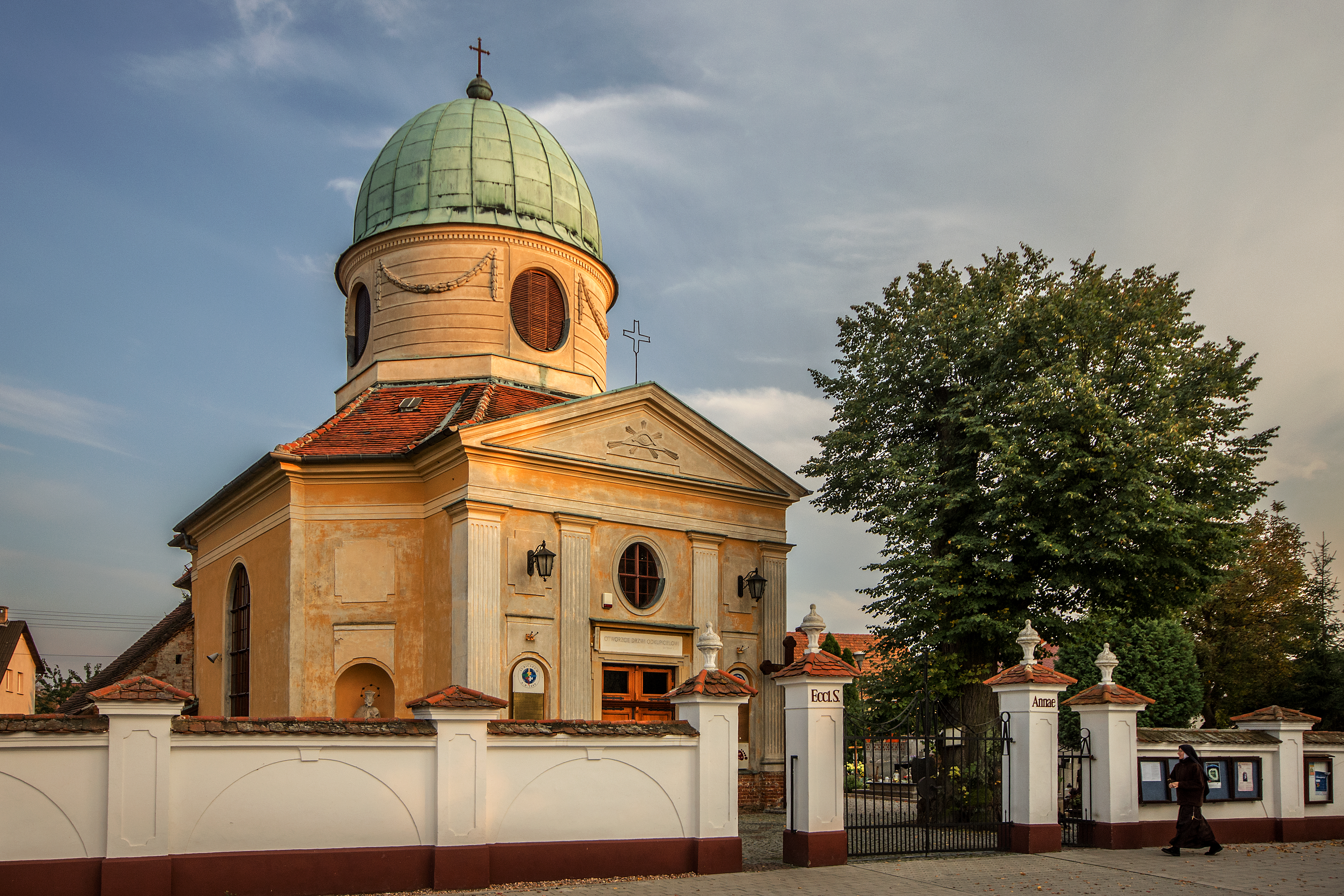
- Saint Anne church in Widawa

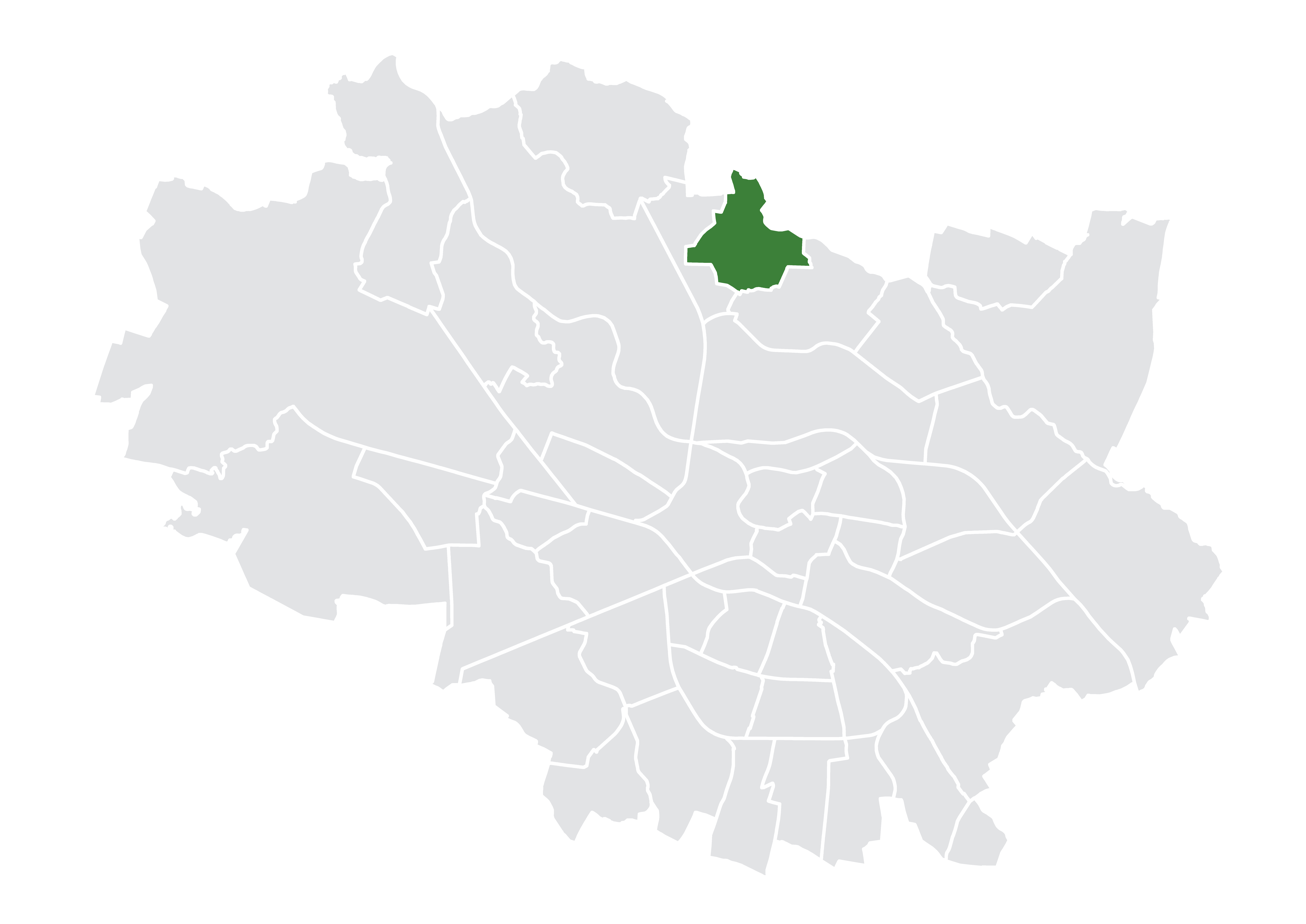
- Location of Widawa within Wrocław
- Country: Poland
- Voivodeship: Lower Silesian
- County/City: Wrocław
- First mentioned: 1193
- Incorporated into the city: 1973
- Established the modern-day district: 1991

Population (2022)
  - Total: 1,764
- Time zone: UTC+1 (CET)
  - Summer (DST): UTC+2 (CEST)
- Area code: +48 71
- Website: Osiedle Widawa

Widawa (Polish: [viˈdava]; German: Weide [ˈvaɪdə]) is a district in Wrocław, Poland, located in the northern part of the city. It was established in the territory of the former Psie Pole district.

Initially a village, the settlement was incorporated into Wrocław in 1973.

== History ==
According to historical records, Widawa was first mentioned on April 8, 1193. The village of Widawa and the former landed estate of Pracz nad Widawą were merged to create the settlement. For the next three centuries, the settlement, which was part of the church estate, developed in the vicinity of Wrocław.

In 1344, it was decided to construct a church in Widawa, which had previously been under the jurisdiction of the church in Ołbin. The founder of the Widawa church was Knight Henricus de Cal, the village owner, whose coat of arms remains the symbol of Widawa to this day. The construction of the church took approximately four years.

Since the 16th century, Lutheranism has significantly expanded in Weide. However, in later years, the church standing there was handed over to the much less numerous Catholics, causing it to deteriorate. In 1604, the pastor of Weide consecrated a new church in Hünern.

At the end of World War II, during the siege of Breslau, the developing settlement was spared from direct warfare. After the war the population of German origin had to leave the village. The march of Soviet troops and their shelters caused extensive damage and the burning of the estate.

In 1991, after reforms in the administrative division of Wrocław, Widawa became one of the city's 48 districts.
