= Polanowice-Poświętne-Ligota =

District in Wrocław, Poland

- District of Wrocław
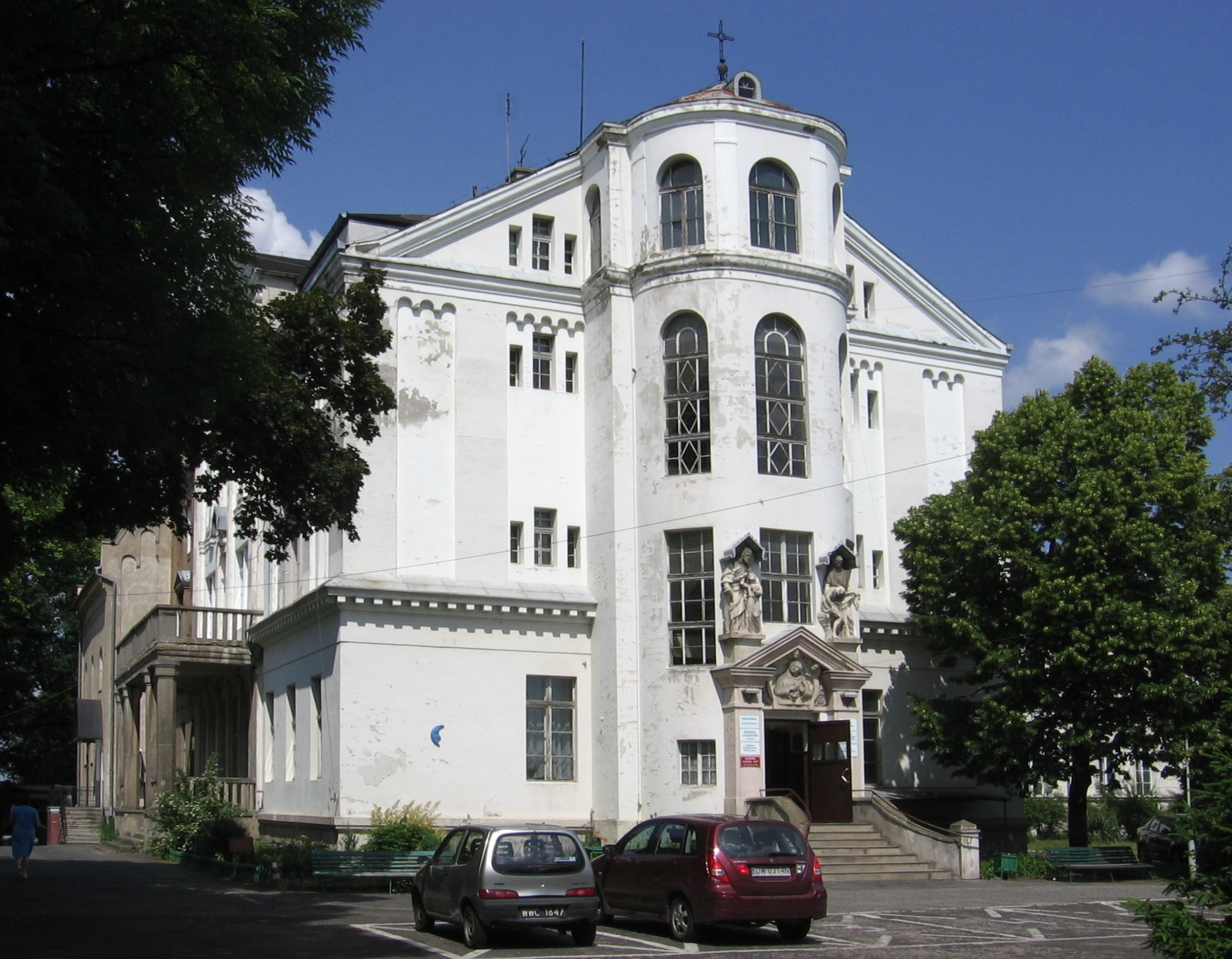
- Hospital in Poświętne

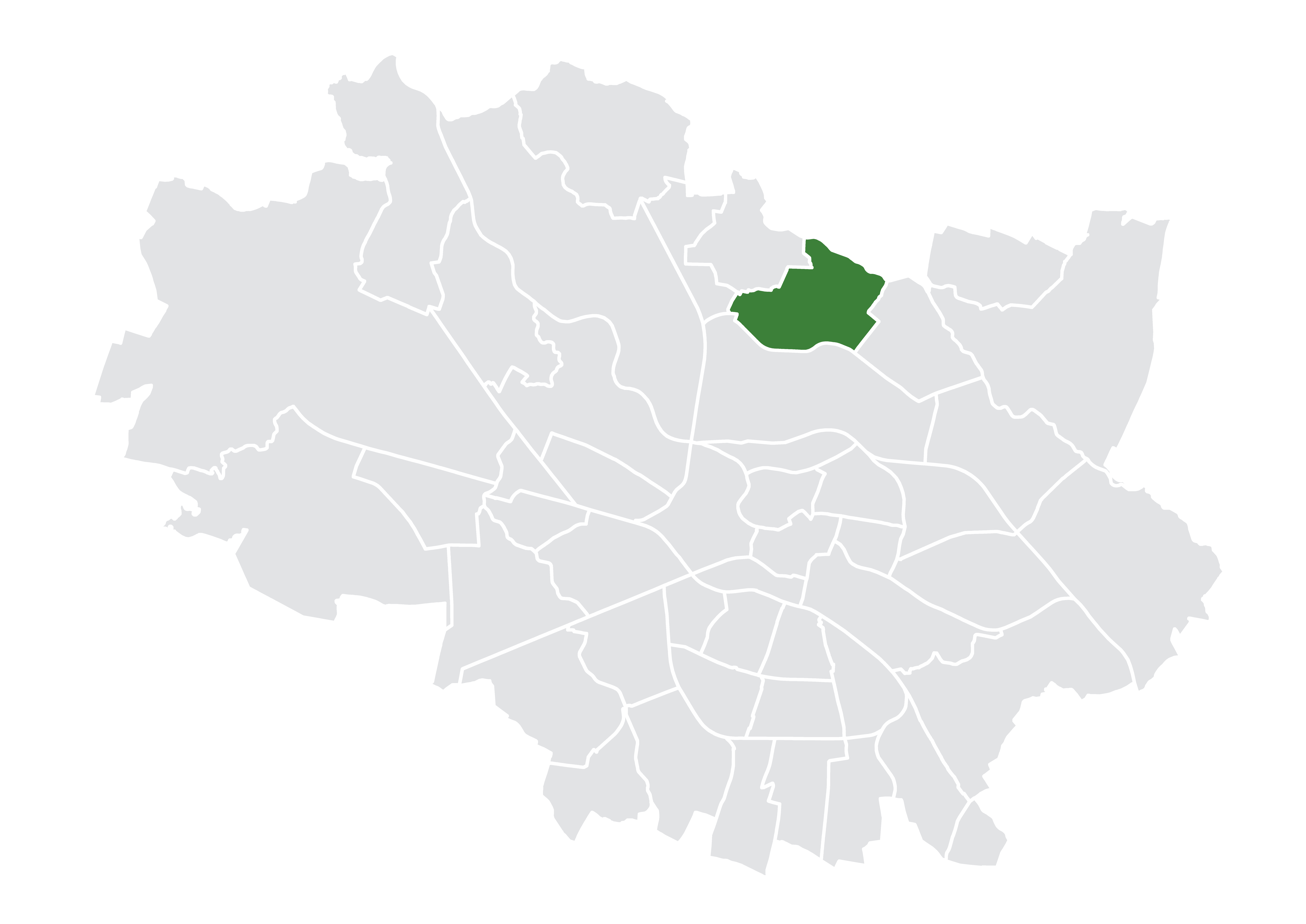
- Location of the district within Wrocław
- Country: Poland
- Voivodeship: Lower Silesian
- County/City: Wrocław
- Established: 1991

Population (2022)
  - Total: 6,204
- Time zone: UTC+1 (CET)
  - Summer (DST): UTC+2 (CEST)
- Area code: +48 71
- Website: Osiedle Polanowice-Poświętne-Ligota

Polanowice-Poświętne-Ligota (Polish pronunciation: [pɔlanɔˈvit͡sɛ pɔˈɕfjɛntnɛ liˈgɔta]) is a district in Wrocław, Poland, located in the northern part of the city. It was established in the territory of the former Psie Pole district.

The district consists of the neighborhoods of Poświętne, Polanowice, and a fragment of Ligota.

== History ==
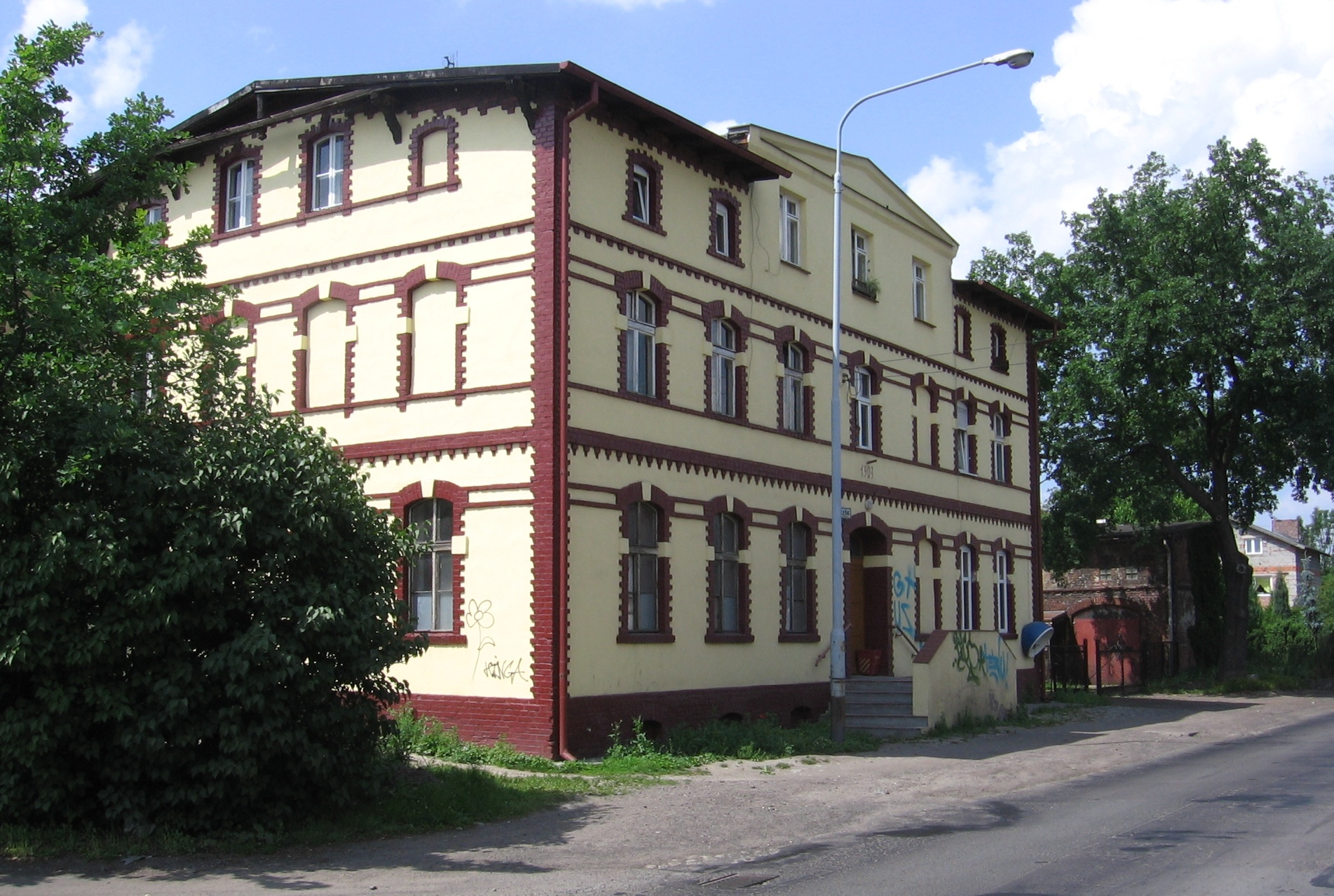
Multifamily house from 1903 in Polanowice

Poświętne was first mentioned in records from 1362 as a grange near the Widawa River under the names of Poswentne and Lilienthal. By the end of the 18th century, the village had a population of 62, including 8 homesteaders. The village was privately owned, and in addition to the manor and the grange, an inn was also mentioned.

At the end of the 19th century, the von Drabizius family, who owned the estate in Lilienthal, died without heirs. In 1897, the Brothers of St. John of God purchased the estate and established a sanatorium for their hospital, along with a chapel dedicated to the Holy Family. The estate was later expanded, the chapel was converted into a church, and a large park was created around it. In 1926, an orthopedic hospital was opened.

Lilienthal was incorporated into Breslau (Wrocław) in 1928. During the 1930s, several multifamily houses were constructed, along with a cycling track.

After the war, single-family housing dominated the area. In the 1970s, part of the territory of Poświętne, especially along Żmigrodzka Street, was allocated for industrial development, including a dairy and bakery. By the end of the 20th century, several more clusters of multi-family housing were built in Poświętne.

In 1991, after reforms in the administrative division of Wrocław, Polanowice-Poświętne-Ligota became one of the city's 48 districts. The district is divided into an older section along Poświęcka Street and a newer section along Milicka Street.
