= Świniary, Wrocław =

District in Wrocław, Poland

Świniary
- District of Wrocław
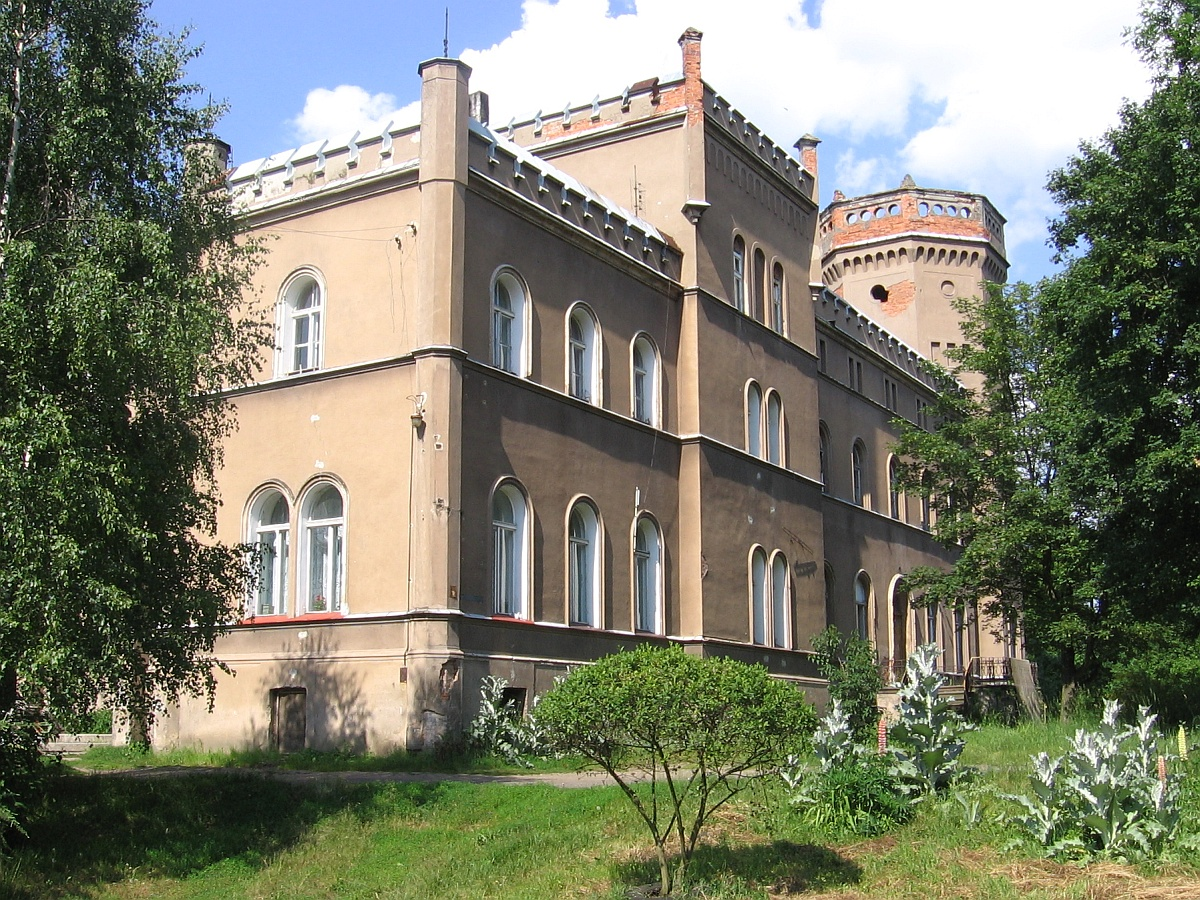

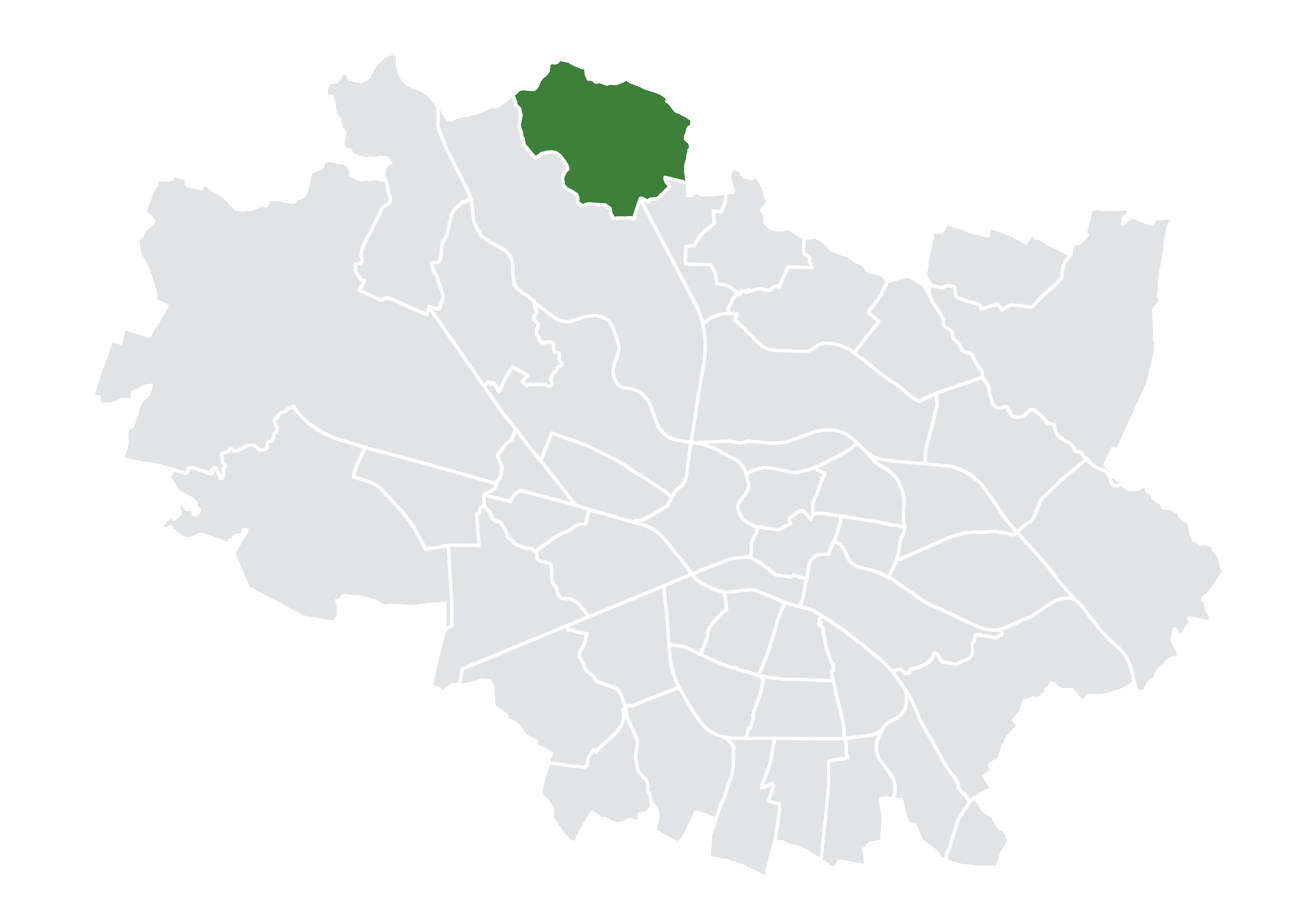
- Location of Świniary within Wrocław
- Country: Poland
- Voivodeship: Lower Silesian
- County/City: Wrocław
- Incorporated into the city: 1928
- Established the modern-day district: 1991

Population (2022)
  - Total: 748
- Time zone: UTC+1 (CET)
  - Summer (DST): UTC+2 (CEST)
- Area code: +48 71

Świniary (Polish: [ɕfiˈɲarɨ]; German: Schweinern [ˈʃvaɪnɐn]) is a district in Wrocław, Poland, located in the northern part of the city. It was established in the territory of the former Psie Pole district.

The settlement was incorporated into Wrocław in 1973.

== History ==
The first mention of the settlement dates back to the 13th century. In 1266, in a document signed by Henry III the White, it is mentioned under the name of Svinar. The name itself comes from the Polish word 'świniarz' ('pig farmer').

On Pęgowska Street there is the abandoned Stolberg Palace from the 19th century. Built in 1845, it has been dilapidated since the end of the 20th century. In 2020 it was put up for sale for just under 5 million PLN.

In 1991, after reforms in the administrative division of Wrocław, Świniary became one of the city's 48 districts.
