= Bartoszowice Barrage =

Barrage in Wrocław, Poland

Coordinates: 51.1030°N 17.1244°E

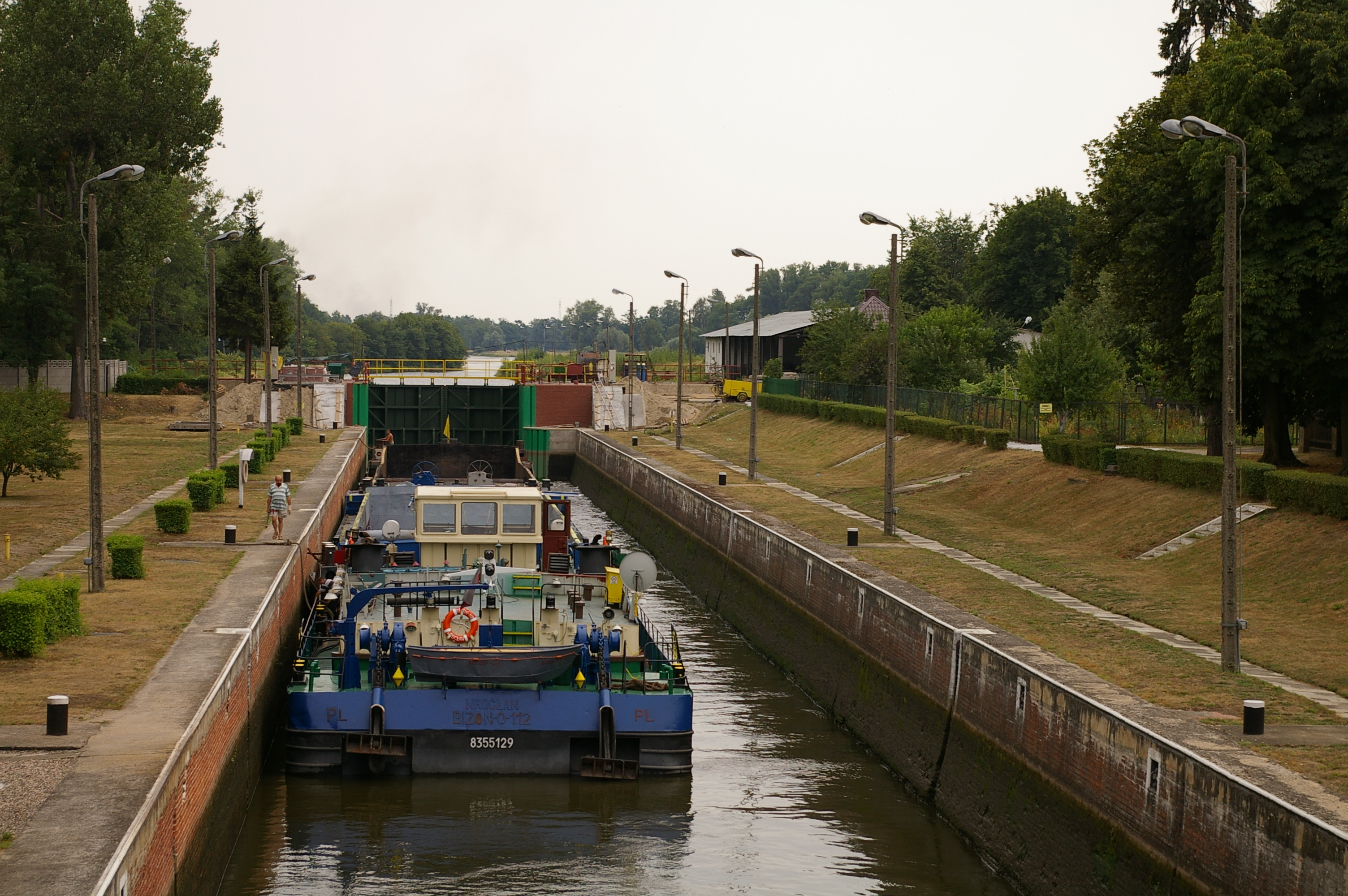
Bartoszowice Lock

Bartoszowice Barrage is a barrage in Wrocław, one of the structures of the Oder Waterway, located on its main waterway running through the city, known as the Main Waterway. The structure regulates the water level of the largest river flowing through the city – the Oder. It includes hydraulic structures located in the area of the Bartoszowice and Swojczyce – Strachocin districts. Within this barrage are hydraulic structures such as the Bartoszowice Weir and the Bartoszowice Lock.

== Components of the barrage ==
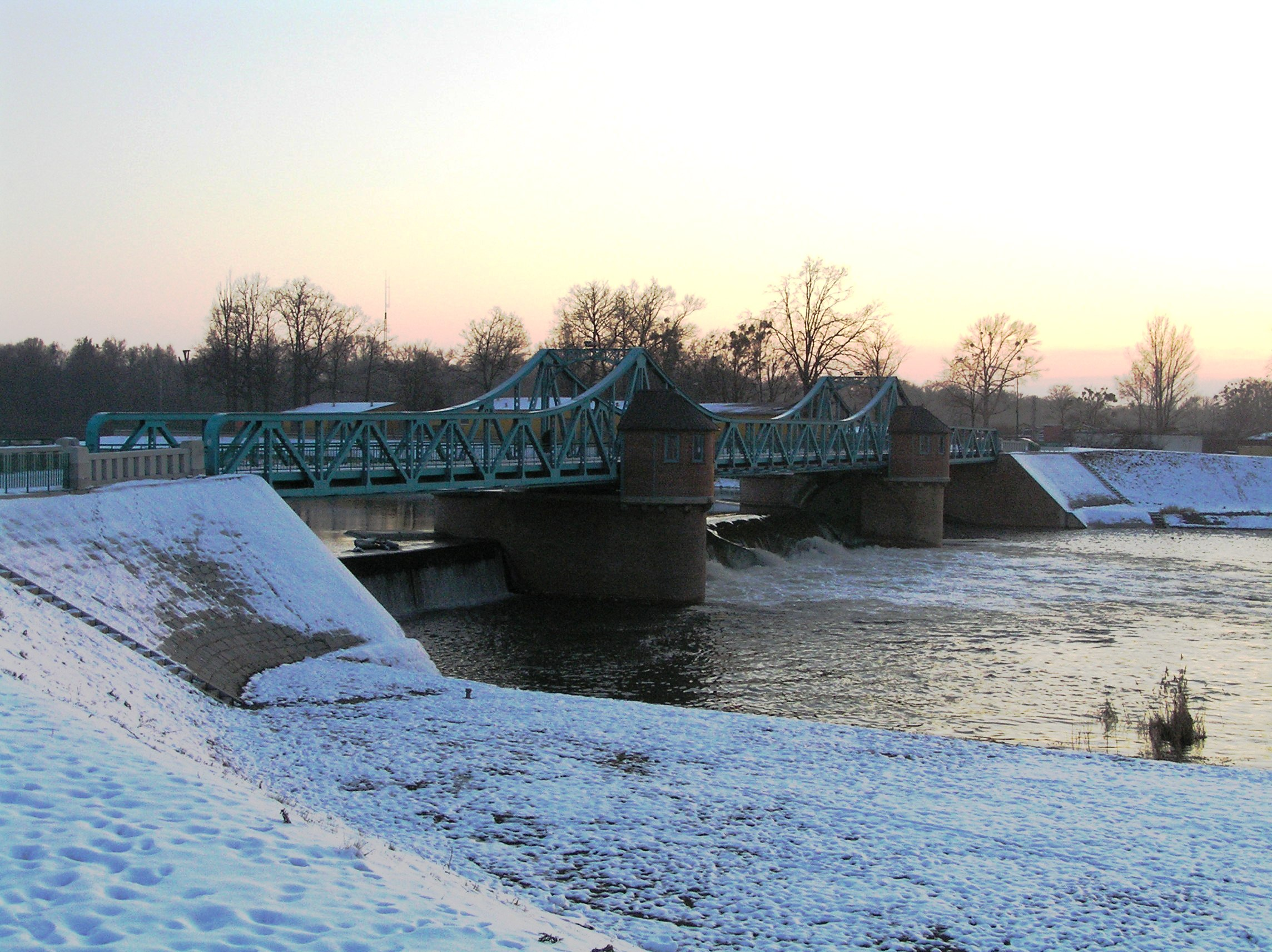
Bartoszowice Weir – downstream side (and Bartoszowice Bridge)

The barrage consists of two primary hydraulic components, i.e., water-regulating structures, as well as buildings and auxiliary or associated objects. The primary components of this barrage are:

- Bartoszowice Weir
- Bartoszowice Lock.

In addition to the primary water-regulating structures, auxiliary and associated elements were built, such as bridges and footbridges for communication, technical and administrative buildings, residential buildings, and additional technical devices and structures.

== History ==
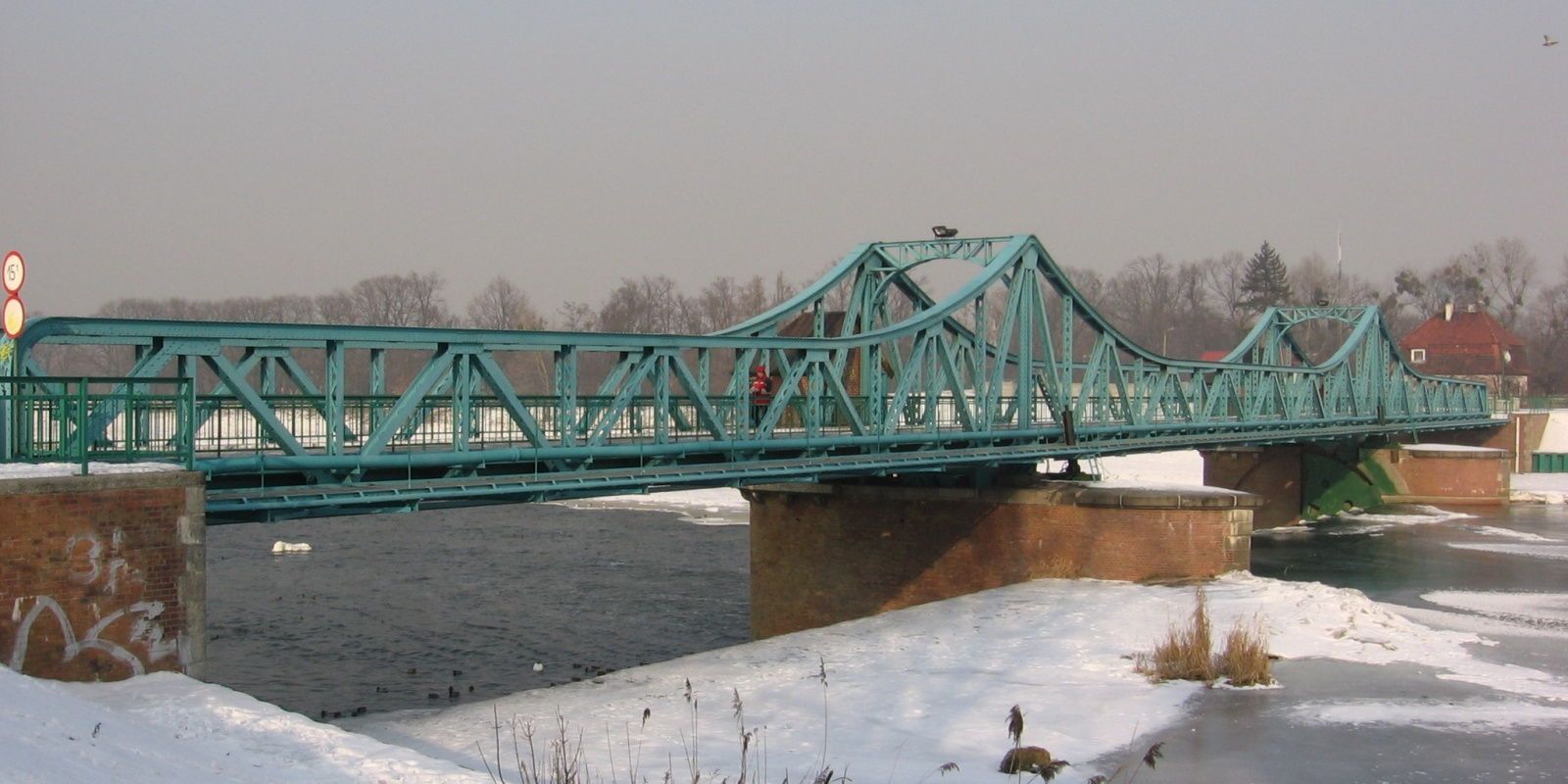
Bartoszowice Weir – upstream side (and Bartoszowice Bridge)

The current form of the Bartoszowice Barrage is the result of an investment involving the construction of a new waterway and a new flood protection system for the city, as well as subsequent investments involving modernization and the construction of new objects. The original investment was carried out between 1913 and 1917. Some of the original structures within the barrage were reconstructed, while others were destroyed and dismantled.

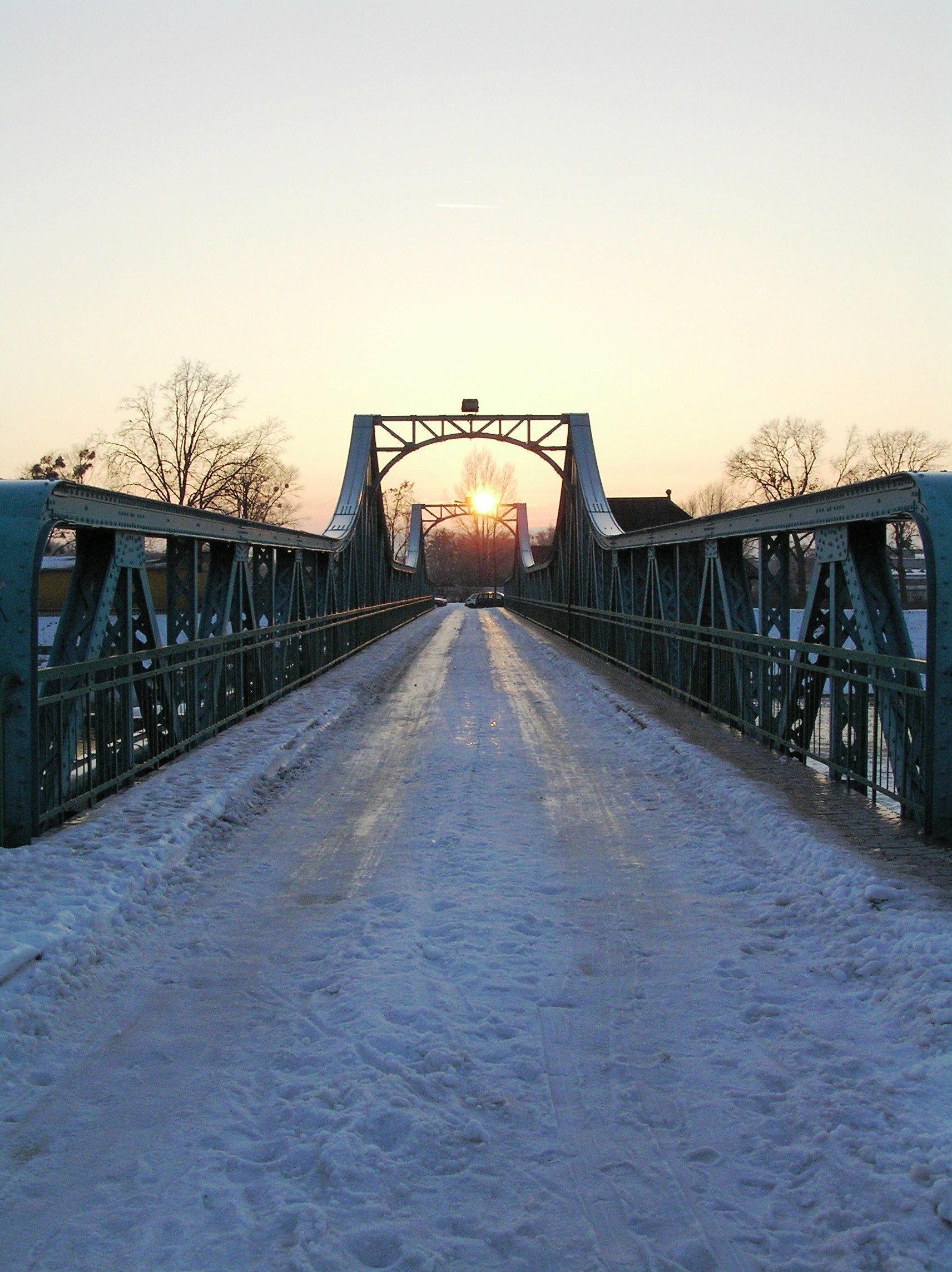
Bartoszowice Bridge

History of the Bartoszowice Barrage
Years	Object	Event, type of works
1913	Bartoszowice Barrage	Start of the construction
1917	Bartoszowice Barrage	Completion of the construction
1945	Bartoszowice Bridge	Destruction of the bridge by Germans during military operations at the end of World War II
1948	Bartoszowice Bridge	Reconstruction
1997	Bartoszowice Weir (and Bartoszowice Bridge)	Renovation after the 1997 Central European flood
2004	Footbridge	Construction
2006	Bartoszowice Lock	Renovation and modernization

== Nomenclature ==
In the post-war period in Poland, appropriate nomenclature was established for the structures and associated objects and canals. The names used for these objects derive from the Bartoszowice district, located on the western, left bank of the Oder. For the lock and weir, names consistent with the Bartoszowice Barrage are used: Bartoszowice Lock and Bartoszowice Weir. Since the current structures were built when Wrocław was part of Germany, they also had earlier German names.

The Bartoszowice Barrage and the Opatowice Barrage, located on the City Waterway running through Wrocław, work closely together to regulate the Oder's water level up to the previous structure on the route, the Janowice barrage. For this reason, some authors of various publications treat the structures of both as a single entity, together with the local hydrological system, defining the Bartoszowice-Opatowice Water Junction.

Current and historical names
Current name	German name
Bartoszowice Weir	Barlhelner Wehr
Bartoszowice Lock	Barlhelner Schleuse

== Location of the barrage ==
The barrage includes water-regulating structures located in two canals, separated by a levee. The crown of this embankment is called Folwarczna Street. From the Bartoszowice district, Braci Gierymskich Street leads to the barrage, along which lies the Bartoszowice Bridge.

Distribution of the barrage's components
Barrage component	245.04 km of the river course	Direction	Bank	Abutment, canal arm	Auxiliary, associated elements
Bartoszowice Weir	0.45 km Flood Relief Canal	Southwestern	Left	Bartoszowice	Bartoszowice Bridge
Bartoszowice Weir	0.45 km Flood Relief Canal	Flood Relief Canal			Bartoszowice Bridge
Bartoszowice Weir	0.45 km Flood Relief Canal	Northeastern	Right	Levee separating canals (Folwarczna Street)	Bartoszowice Bridge
Bartoszowice Lock	244.4 km Oder; 0.5 km Navigation Canal	Southwestern	Left	Levee separating canals (Folwarczna Street)	Administrative and technical buildings, footbridge, floodgates
Bartoszowice Lock	244.4 km Oder; 0.5 km Navigation Canal	Navigation Canal			Administrative and technical buildings, footbridge, floodgates
Bartoszowice Lock	244.4 km Oder; 0.5 km Navigation Canal	Northeastern	Right	Swojczyce – Strachocin	Administrative and technical buildings, footbridge, floodgates

== Role in the functional system ==
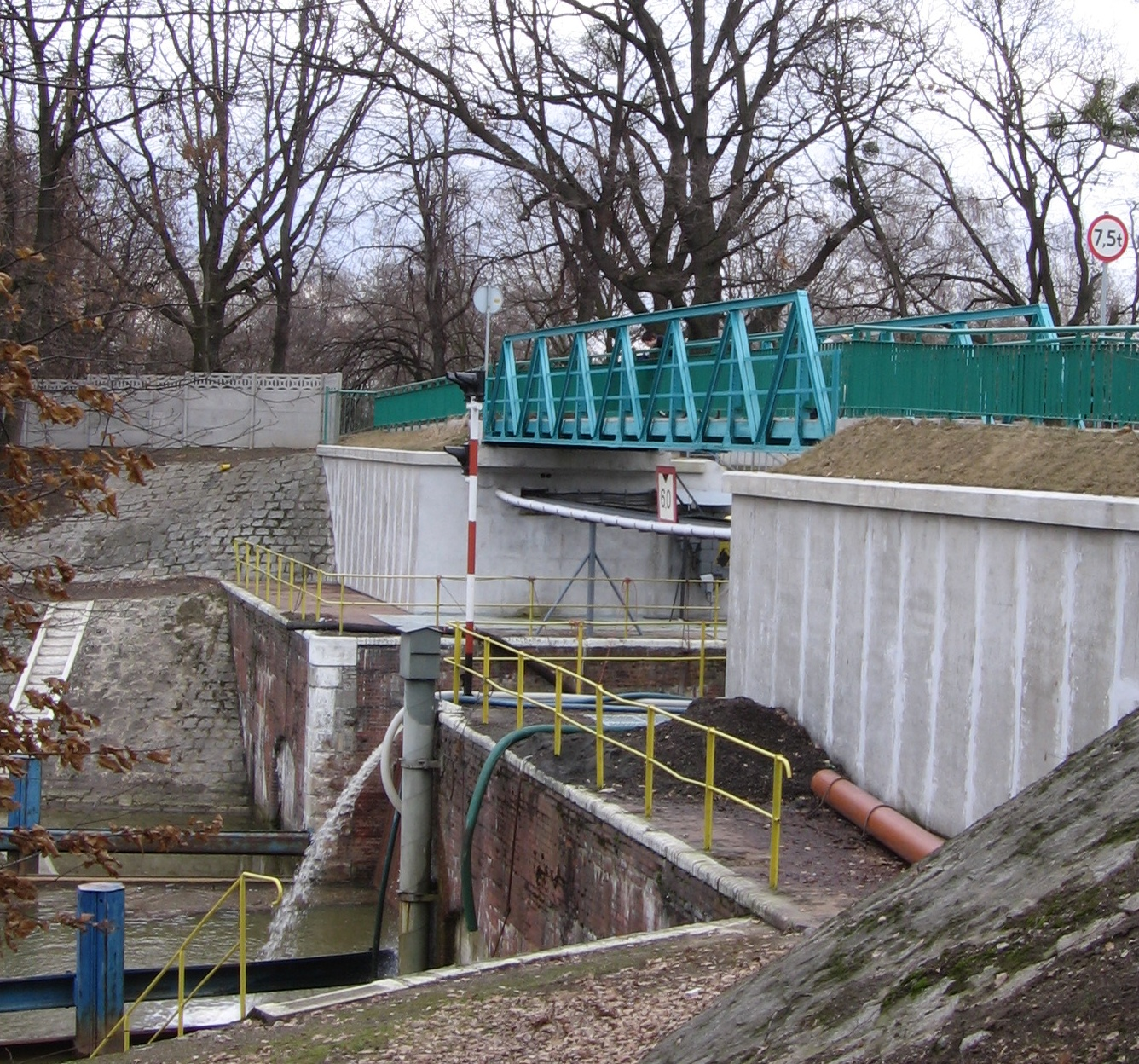
Downstream side of the lock and footbridge

Wrocław is located on a canalized section of the Oder river. This means that the Bartoszowice Barrage is part of a series of structures maintaining the required water level on the river:

- The previous barrage is the Janowice Barrage.
- Concurrently, on the City Waterway in Wrocław, there is the Opatowice Barrage, as well as a sluice gate allowing the transfer, via the Outflow Canal, of part of the floodwaters to the Widawa.
- The next barrage is the Zacisze Barrage.

The waterway passing through the Bartoszowice Barrage is a waterway as defined by relevant legal regulations, specifically the Council of Ministers' regulation on inland waterways – a list of inland waterways, included in the list of inland waterways as an annex to this regulation. This is the Oder Waterway, part of the international waterway E–30. It is the main route for this waterway, with a secondary route passing through the Opatowice Barrage.

The Bartoszowice Barrage and the Opatowice Barrage are the first in the sequence of barrages in the Wrocław Water Junction. These two barrages, along with an additional sluice gate, control the entire water flow in the Oder through the city. The Opatowice Barrage directs water to the Downtown Water Junction and the City Waterway, while the Bartoszowice Barrage directs water to the Main Waterway and the Flood Relief Canal. The sluice gate allows the transfer of Oder waters to the Widawa via the Outflow Canal.

== Primary structures ==
The primary structures of the barrage are those that maintain the designated water level and perform other specific functions for which the structure is designed. The water level drop at the barrage for the normal water level is 3.7 m for the weir and 3.1 m for the lock.

Primary structures of the Bartoszowice Barrage
Name	Anabranch, canal	Type	Construction date	Basic data
Bartoszowice Weir	Flood Relief Canal	Weir	1917	Spans: 30+40+30 m; Closures: Fixed+segmented+fixed
Bartoszowice Lock	Navigation Canal	Lock	1917	Dimensions: 187.7 × 9.6 m; Closures: Supported gates

== Additional structures ==
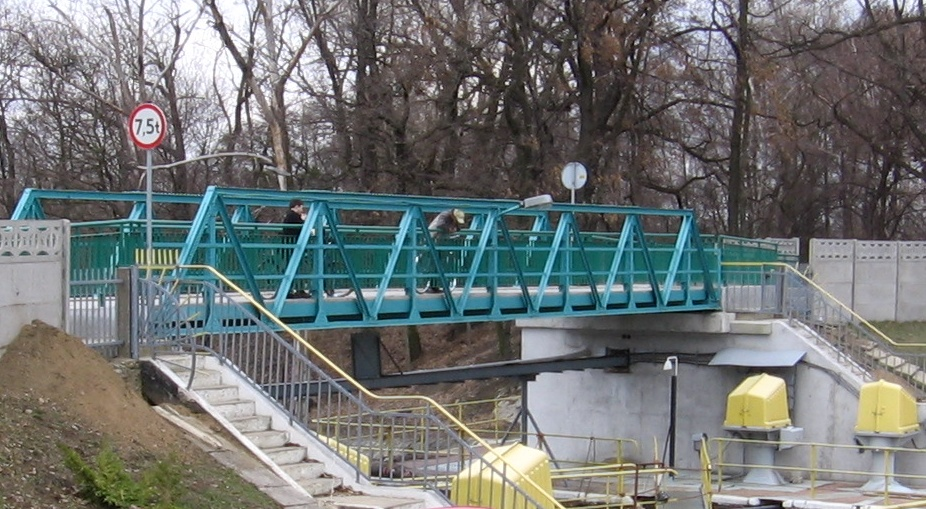
Footbridge built over the Navigation Canal at the Bartoszowice Lock

Among the complementary and associated structures built within the barrage are:

- Flood Relief Canal and Navigation Canal, separated by an levee
- Bartoszowice Bridge
- Residential, administrative, and technical buildings
- Footbridge
- Floodgates at the upstream end of the lock
- Additional closures at the weir.

Among the now non-existent structures is a steel bridge that once existed at the lock; it was destroyed during wartime operations and not rebuilt, with a footbridge constructed in its place in 2004.
