= Zacisze Barrage =

Barrage in Wrocław, Poland

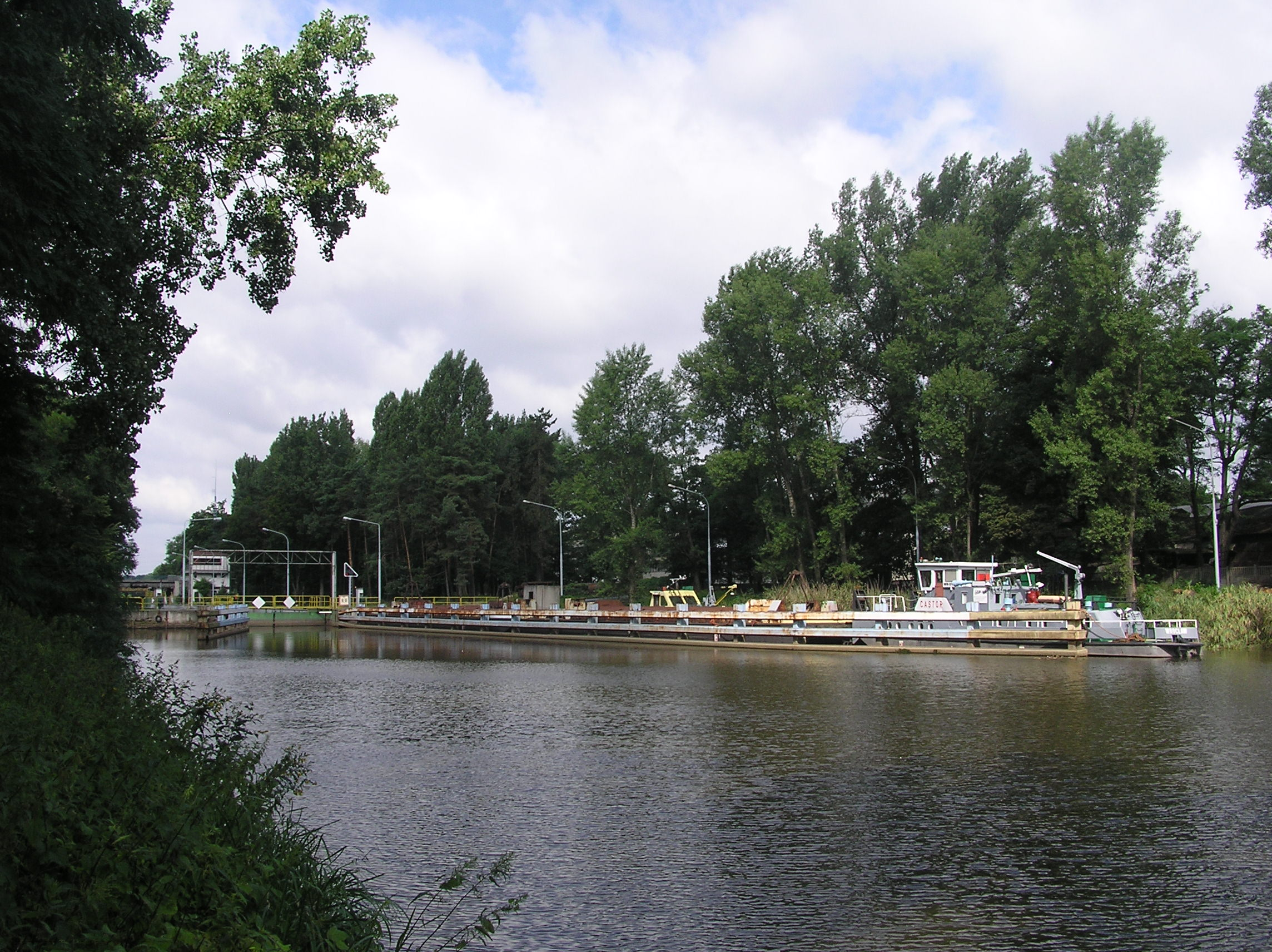
Zacisze Lock (upper position)

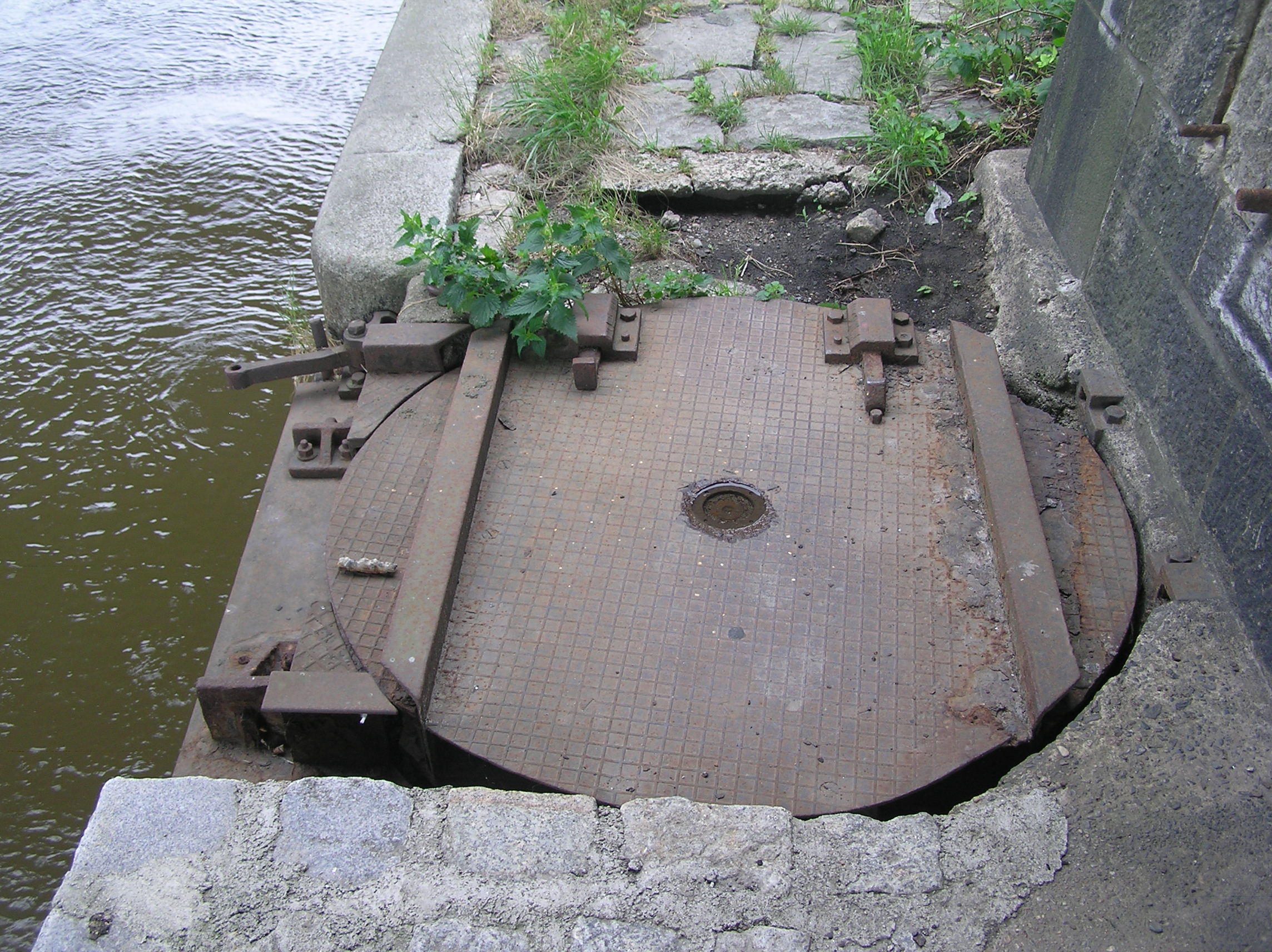
Zacisze Needle Dam (railway turntable)

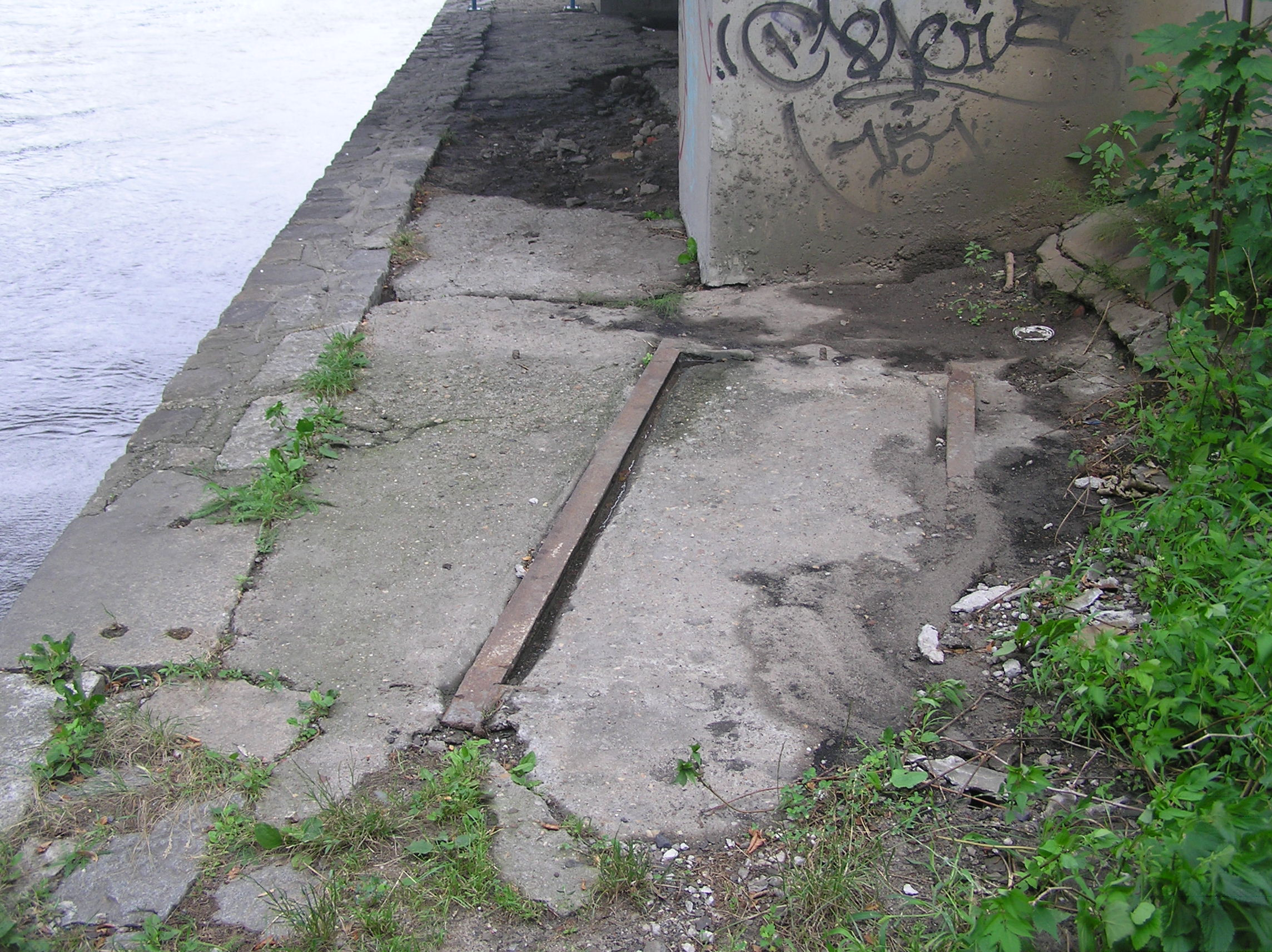
Zacisze Needle Dam (remains of railway tracks)

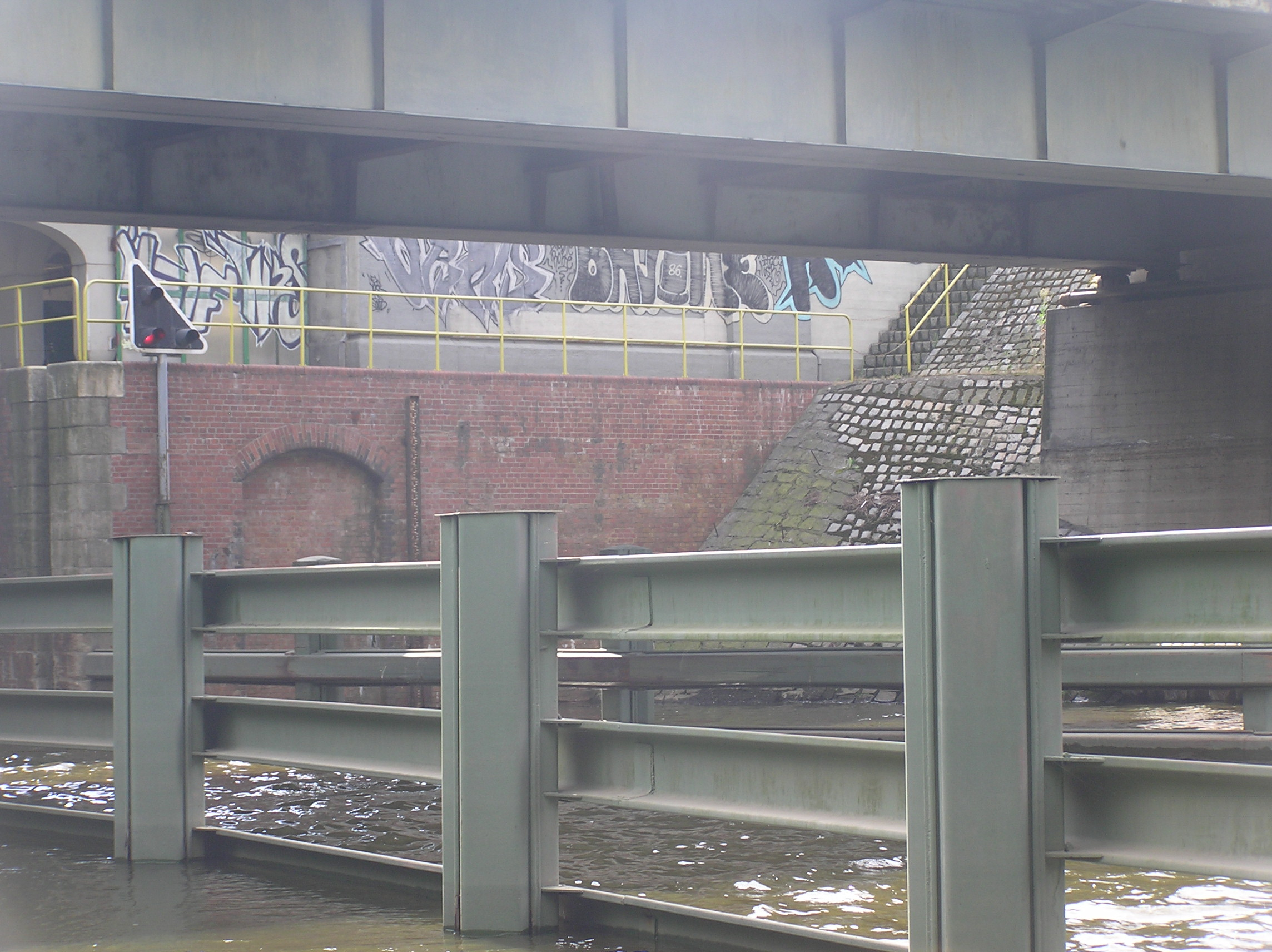
Zacisze Lock (guide wall, lower position)

Zacisze Barrage is a barrage in Wrocław, Poland, forming part of the Oder Waterway, specifically along its main navigable route through the city, known as the Main Waterway.

This barrage regulates the flow of the Oder, the largest river passing through Wrocław, across two canals constructed alongside the barrage structures. These canals were developed to enhance flood protection and establish a new fairway tailored to the transportation needs of the time. The barrage includes structures located in the districts of Zacisze and Kowale–Mirowiec. Main hydraulic structures within this barrage include the Zacisze Needle Dam and the Zacisze Lock. This barrage, unlike others where hydraulic structures work together to regulate water level, the lock and needle dam there operate independently on separate canals, each controlling the water level only within its respective canal. Currently, only the Zacisze Lock remains in operation; the Zacisze Needle Dam has been dismantled and stored at the canal bottom, taken out of service.

== Components ==
The Zacisze Barrage comprises two primary hydraulic structures, along with associated buildings and auxiliary elements. The main components are:

- Zacisze Needle Dam
- Zacisze Lock

In addition to these primary structures, auxiliary and supporting elements were constructed, including technical and administrative buildings, the lock control building, and other technical devices and structures.

== History ==
The current configuration of the Zacisze Barrage resulted from an infrastructure project aimed at constructing a new waterway and enhancing the city's flood protection system, followed by subsequent modernizations and additional constructions. The initial project was carried out between 1913 and 1917. Some original structures have been rebuilt, while others were damaged and dismantled.

History of Zacisze Barrage
| Years | Structure | Event or type of work |
|---|---|---|
| 1913 | Zacisze Barrage | Construction – start |
| 1917 | Zacisze Barrage | Construction – completion |
| 1948 | Residential building | Reconstruction |
| 1954 | Zacisze Needle Dam | Decommissioning |
| 1980–1989 | Residential building | Expansion |

== Nomenclature ==
During the post-war period in Poland, specific nomenclature was established for the barrage's structures, associated facilities, and canals. The names are derived from the Zacisze district, located on the southern, left bank of the Flood Relief Canal. The lock and needle dam are named consistently with the barrage: Zacisze Lock and Zacisze Needle Dam.

Contemporary and historical names
| Current name | German name |
|---|---|
| Zacisze Needle Dam | Nakonzbrücke Wehr |
| Zacisze Lock | Nakonzbrücke Schleuse |
| Folwarczna Street | Zedlitz Weg |
| Jagiellońskie Bridges | Nakonz Brücke, Wilhelmsruher Schleussen Brücke |
| Lock keeper's building | Schleusemeister Haus |

== Location ==
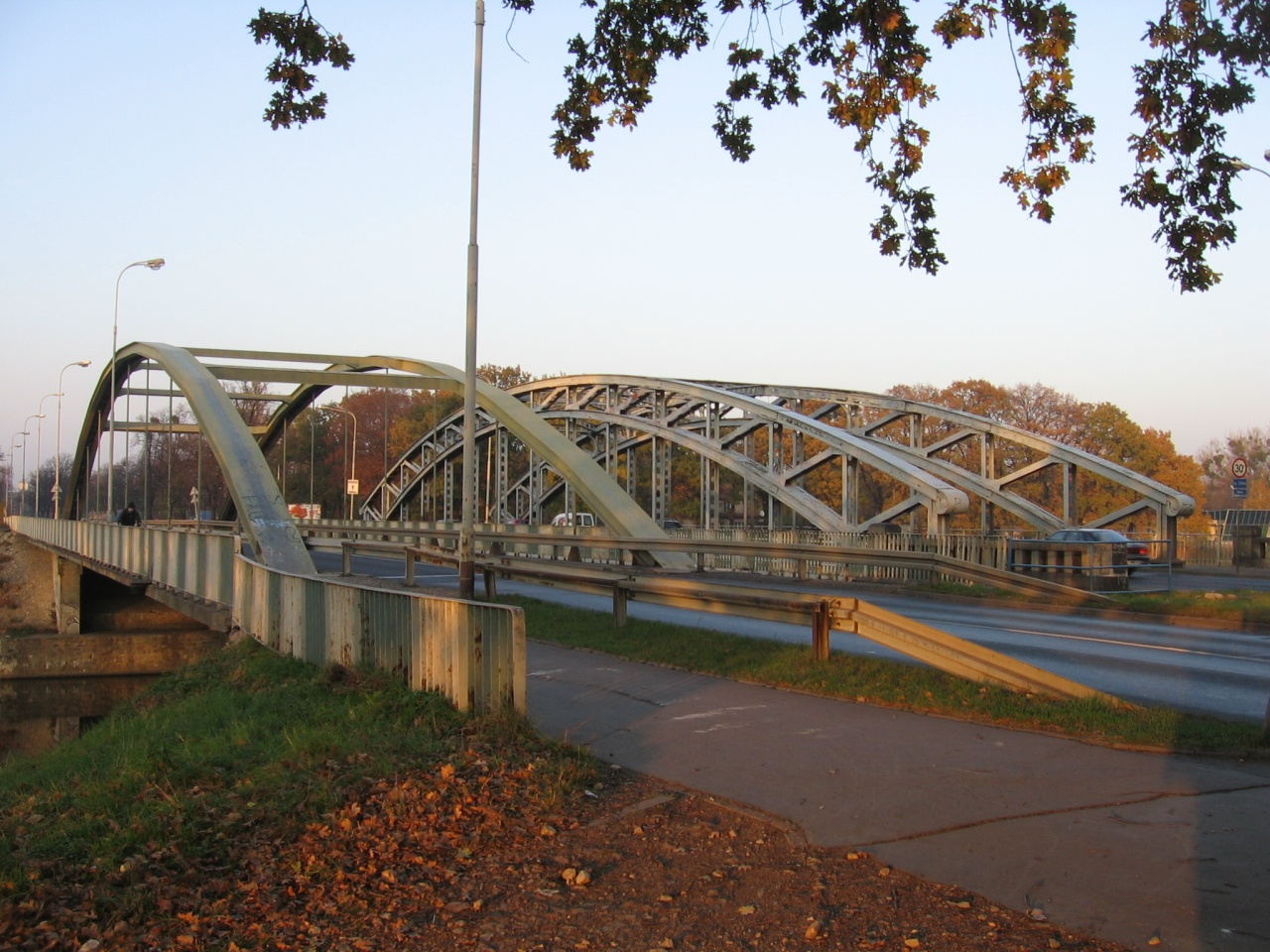
Jagiellońskie Bridges

Arrangement of barrage structures
| Component | River/Canal kilometer | Direction | Bank | Abutment, canal arm | Auxiliary and associated elements |
|---|---|---|---|---|---|
| Zacisze Needle Dam | 4.87 km Flood Relief Canal | Southern | Left | Zacisze | Jagielloński Bridge, warehouse |
| Zacisze Needle Dam | 4.87 km Flood Relief Canal | Flood Relief Canal | | | Jagielloński Bridge, warehouse |
| Zacisze Needle Dam | 4.87 km Flood Relief Canal | Northern | Right | Levee separating canals (Folwarczna Street) | Jagielloński Bridge, warehouse |
| Zacisze Lock | 249.4 km Oder; 5.1 km Navigation Canal | Southern | Left | Levee separating canals (Folwarczna Street) | Jagielloński Bridge, administrative and technical buildings, control building, flood gates |
| Zacisze Lock | 249.4 km Oder; 5.1 km Navigation Canal | Navigation Canal | | | Jagielloński Bridge, administrative and technical buildings, control building, flood gates |
| Zacisze Lock | 249.4 km Oder; 5.1 km Navigation Canal | Northern | Right | Kowale, Mirowiec | Jagielloński Bridge, administrative and technical buildings, control building, flood gates |

== Role in the functional system ==
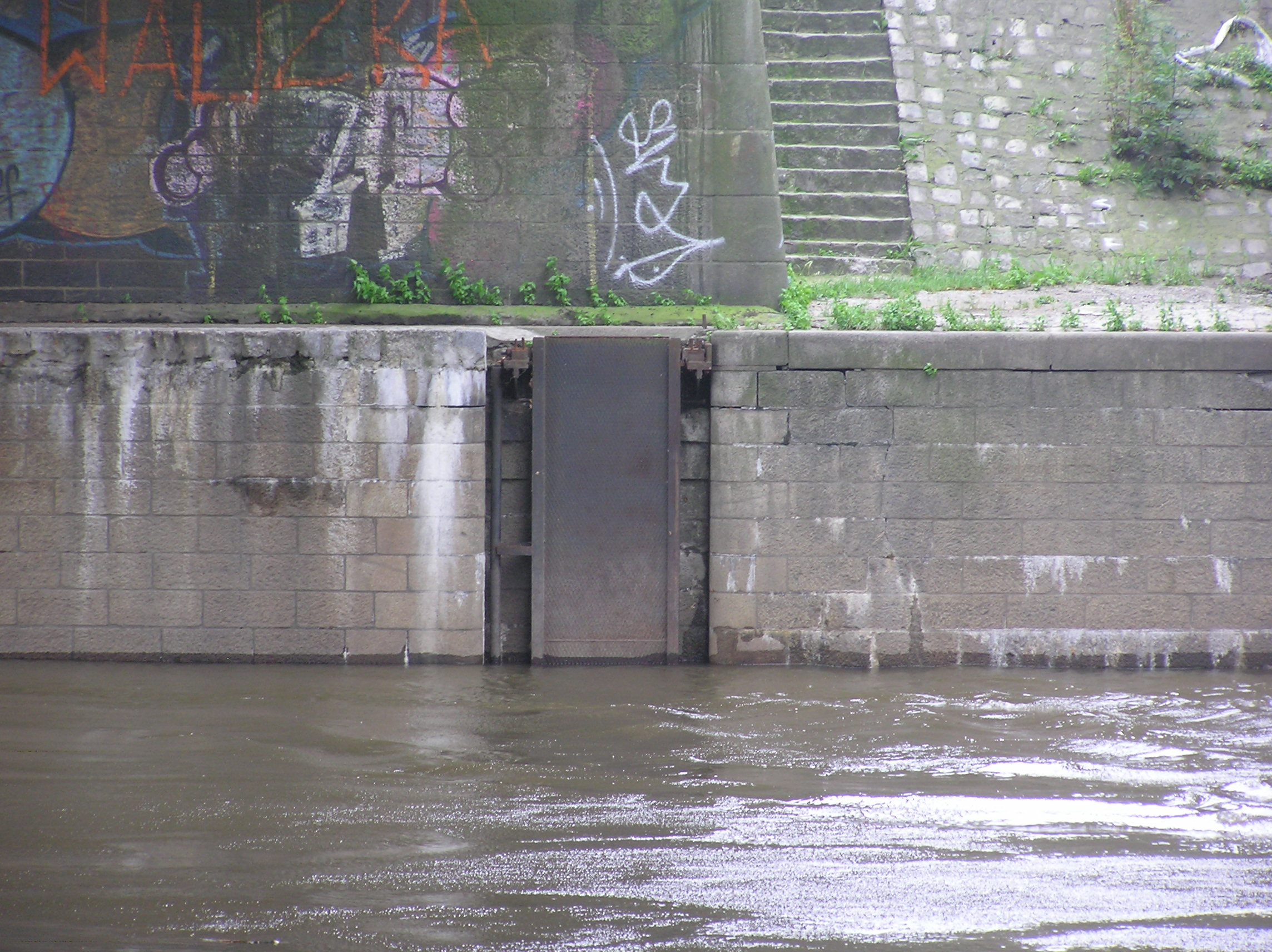
Zacisze Needle Dam (left abutment)

Wrocław is situated along a canalized section of the Oder river. The Zacisze Barrage is one of a series of barrages maintaining the required water level on the river:

- The preceding barrage is Bartoszowice Barrage.
- Concurrently, the Psie Pole Barrage is located on the City Waterway in Wrocław.
- The subsequent barrage is Różanka Barrage.

The navigable route through the Zacisze Barrage is classified as a waterway under relevant legal provisions, specifically the Council of Ministers' regulation on inland waterways, listed in the annex of inland waterways. This is part of the Oder Waterway, a component of the international waterway E-30. It serves as the main route for this waterway, with a secondary route passing through the Psie Pole Barrage.

== Primary structures ==
The primary structures of the barrage maintain the designated water level and perform specific functions. The head for the normal pool level is 3.1 m for the lock and 2.3 m for the needle dam, which is currently decommissioned.

Primary structures of Zacisze Barrage
| Name | Anabranch, Canal | Type | Construction date | Specifications | Image |
|---|---|---|---|---|---|
| Zacisze Needle Dam | Flood Relief Canal | Needle dam | 1917 | Spans: 54.04 m; Closures: Needle-type | |
| Zacisze Lock | Navigation Canal | Lock | 1917 | Dimensions: 187.0 × 9.6 m; Closures: Swing gates | |

== Additional structures ==
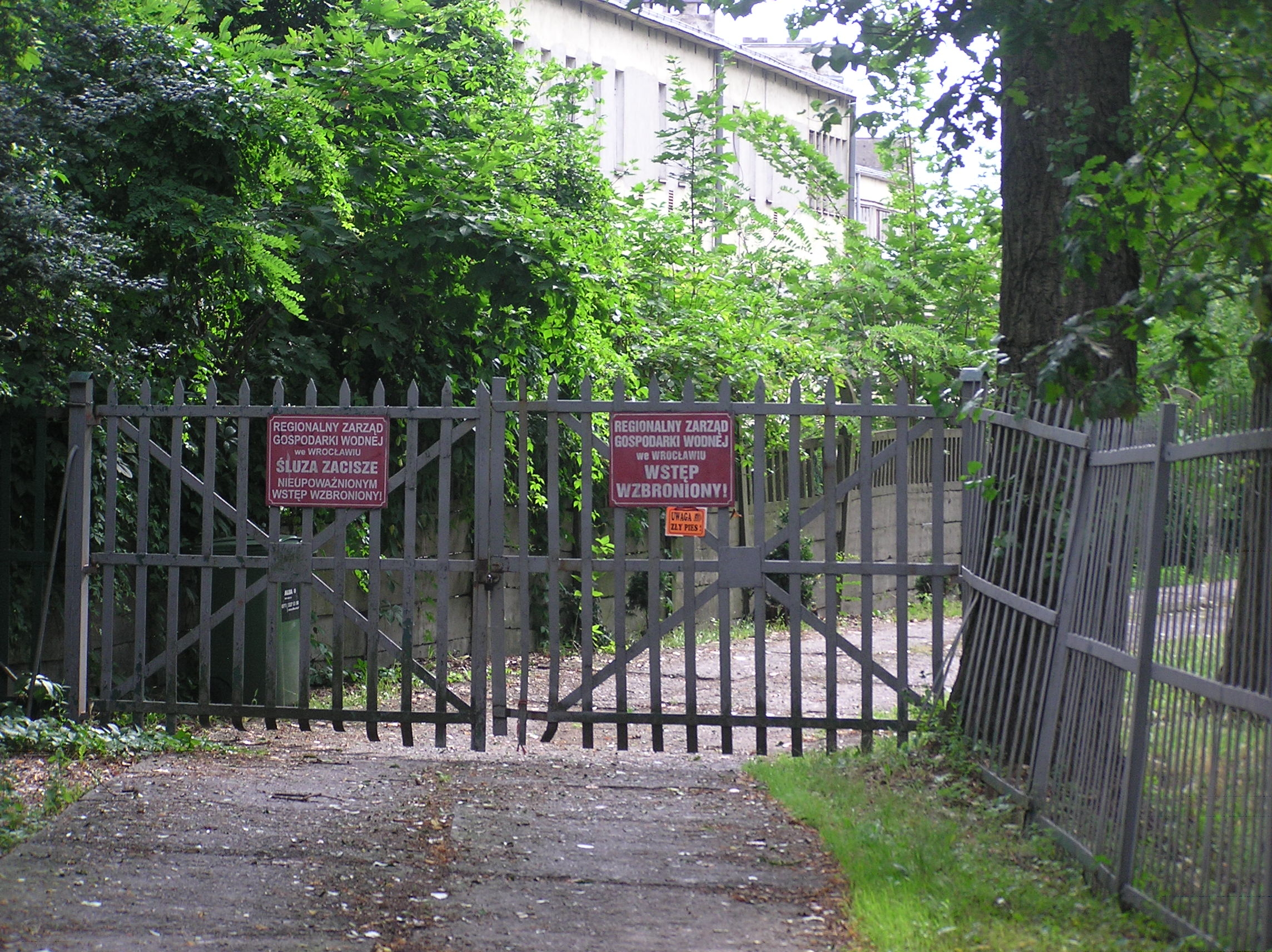
Zacisze Lock (entry to the premises of the lock)

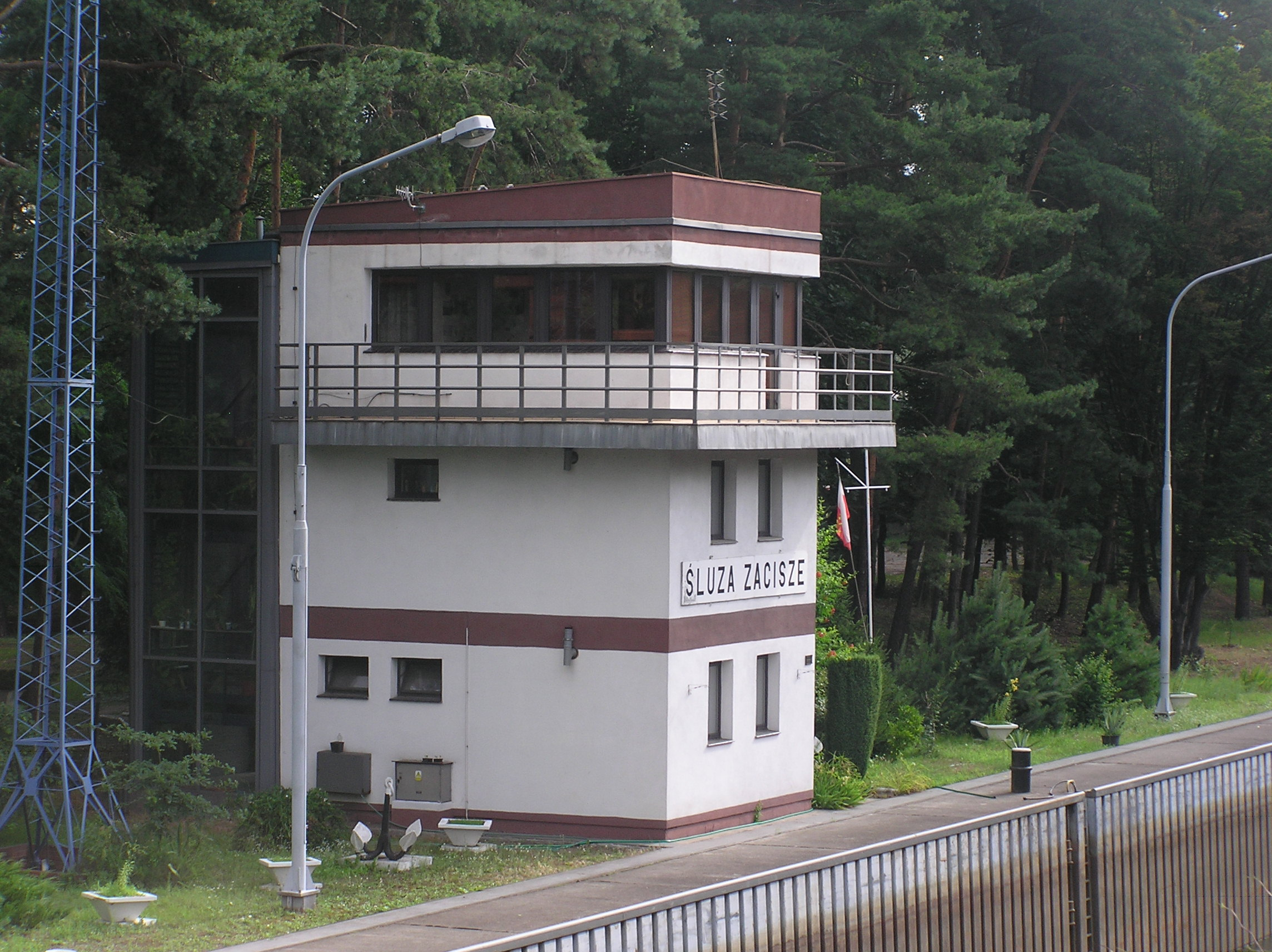
Zacisze Lock (control room building)

Additional and supporting structures within the barrage include:

- Flood Relief and Navigation canals, separated by a levee
- Jagiellońskie Bridges
- Buildings:
  - Lock keeper's building
  - Needle dam shed
  - Utility building
  - Lock control room
  - Residential building
  - Guardhouse and restroom
- Railway tracks for transporting needles with a turntable
- Flood gates at the lower end of the lock
