= Wrocław =

Historical capital and largest city of Silesia, located in southwestern Poland

- City county
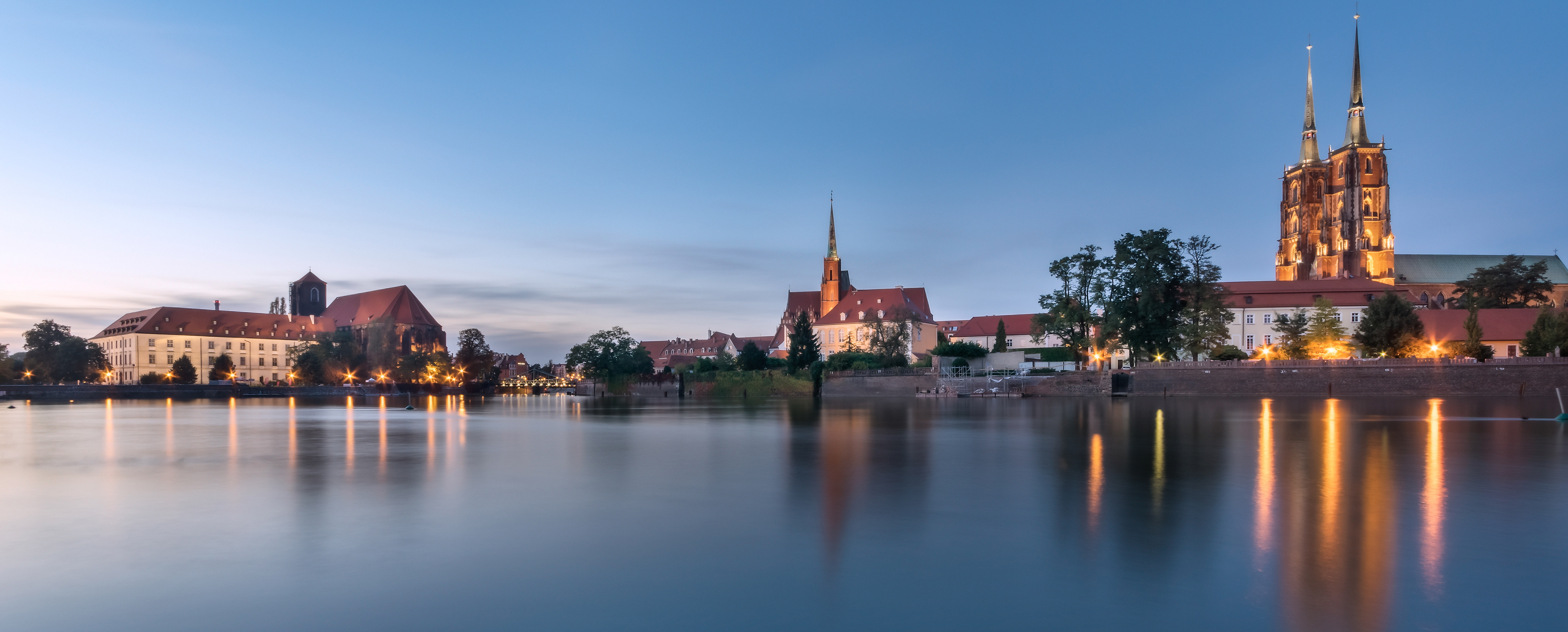
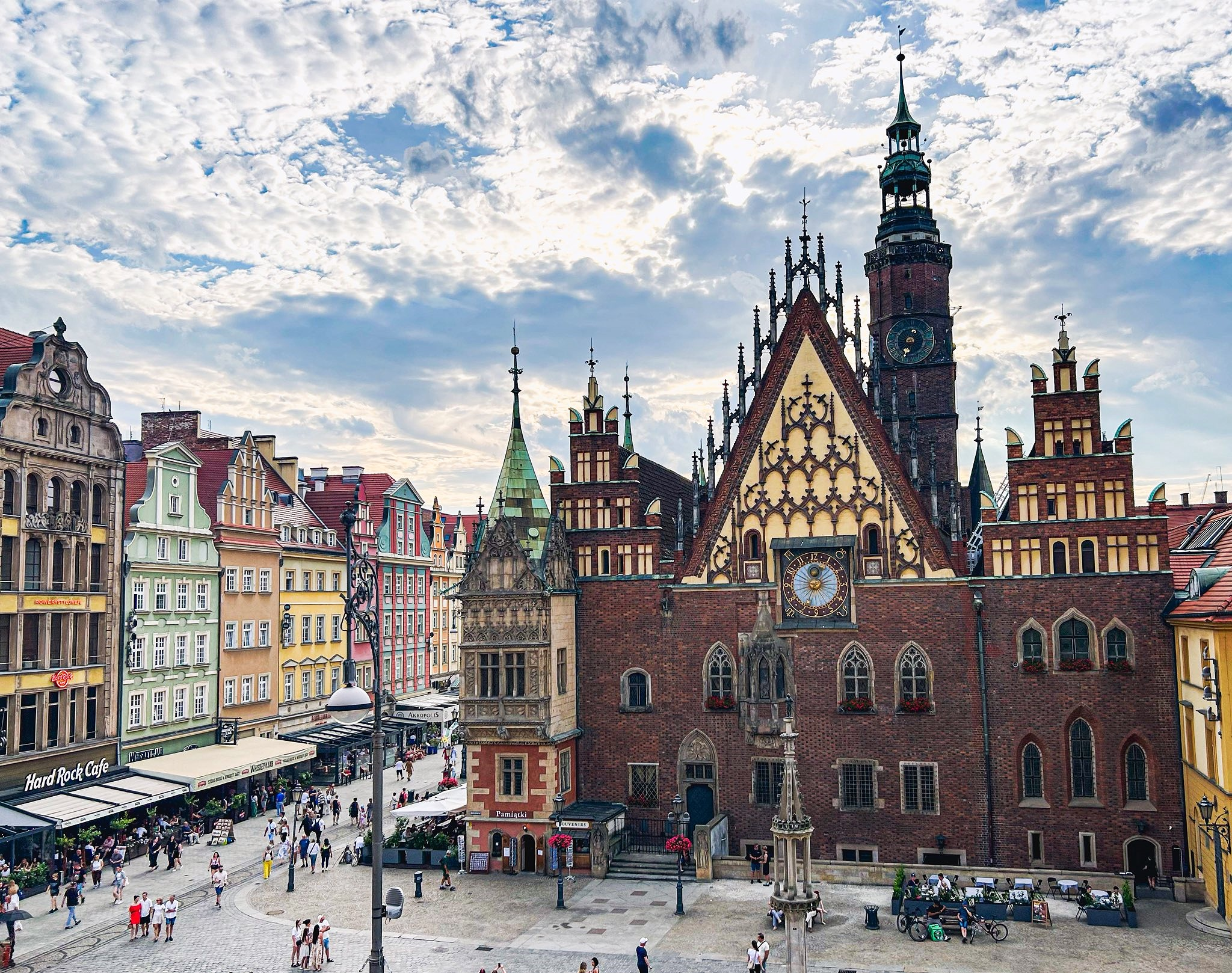
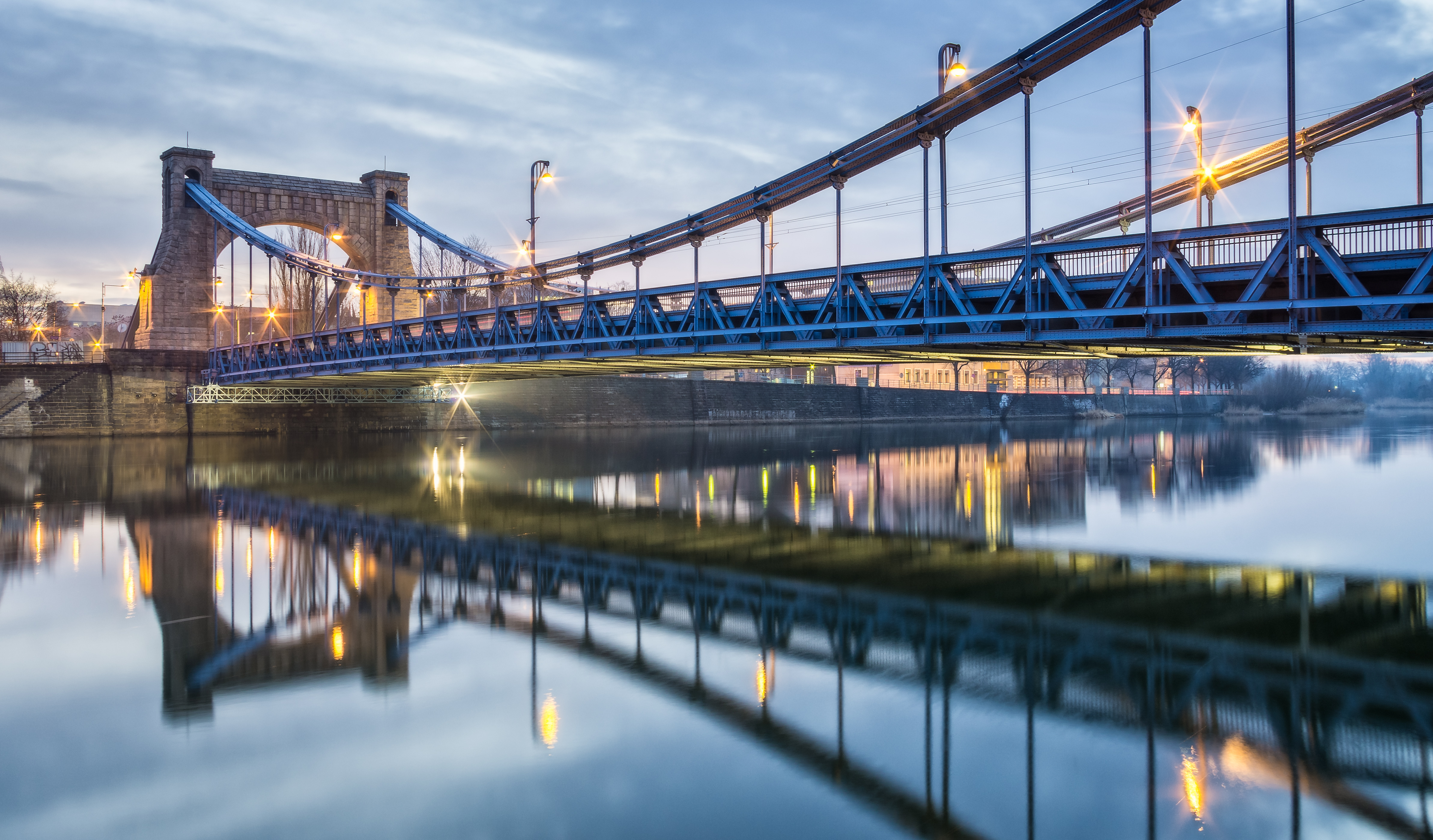
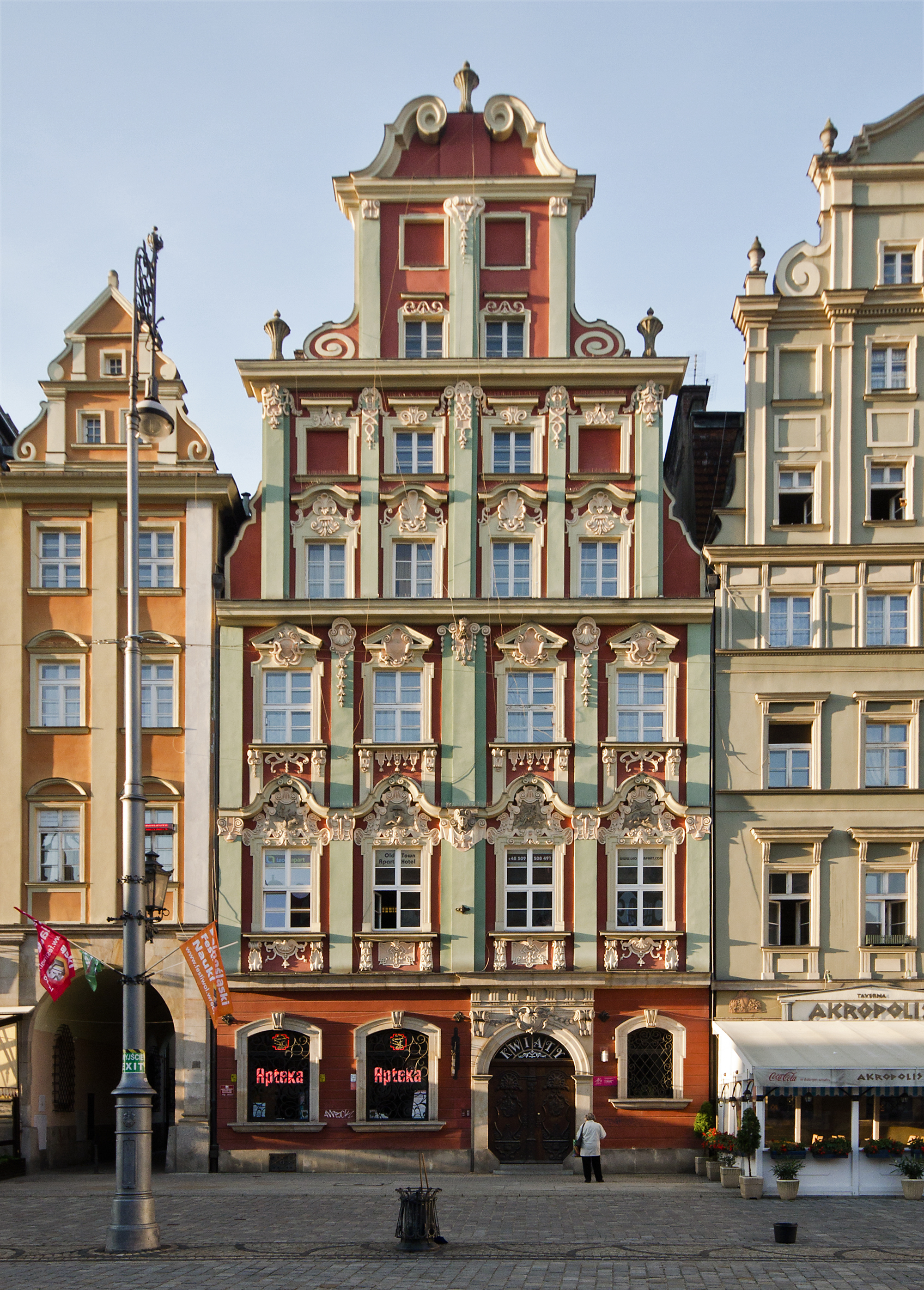
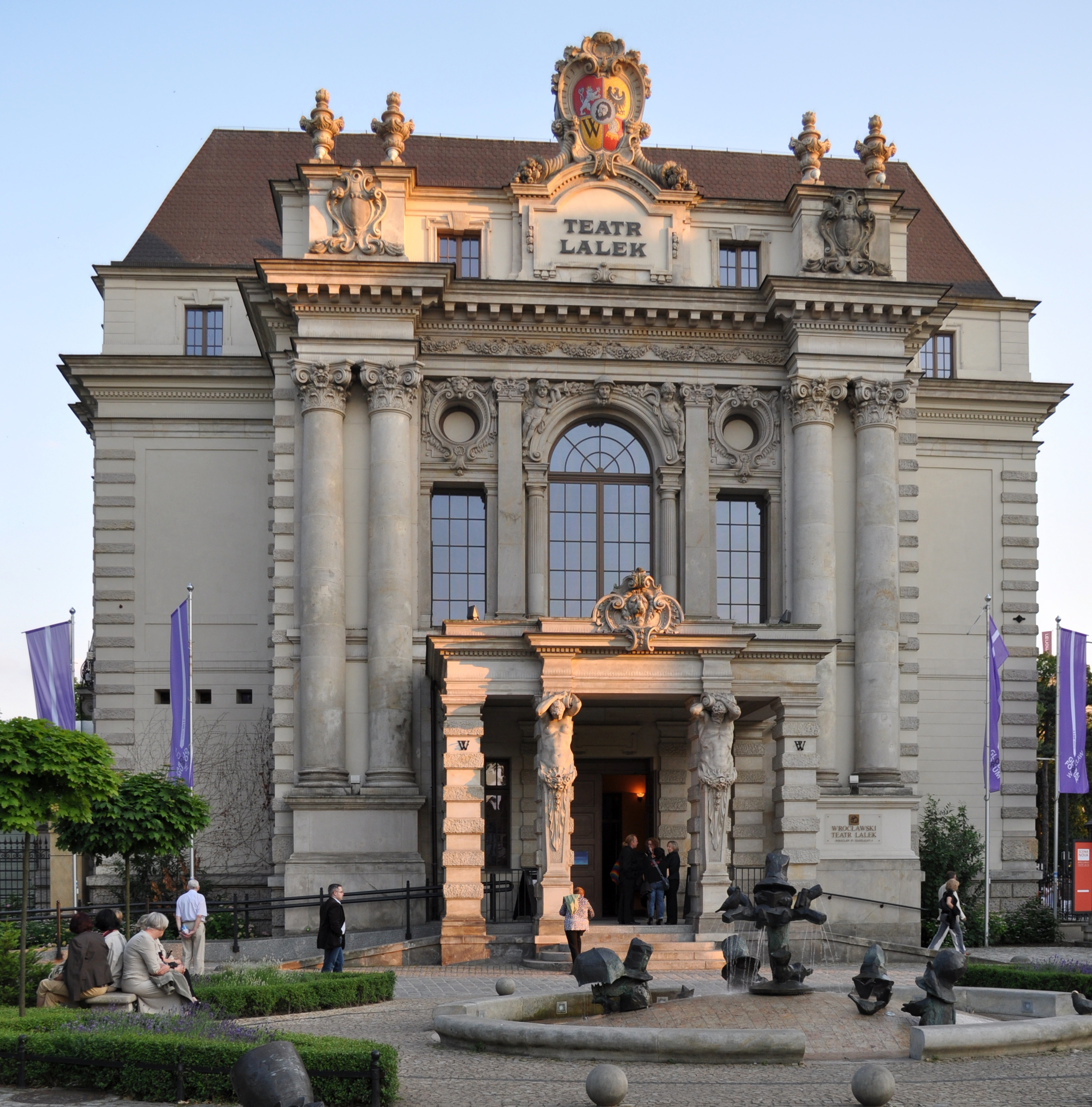
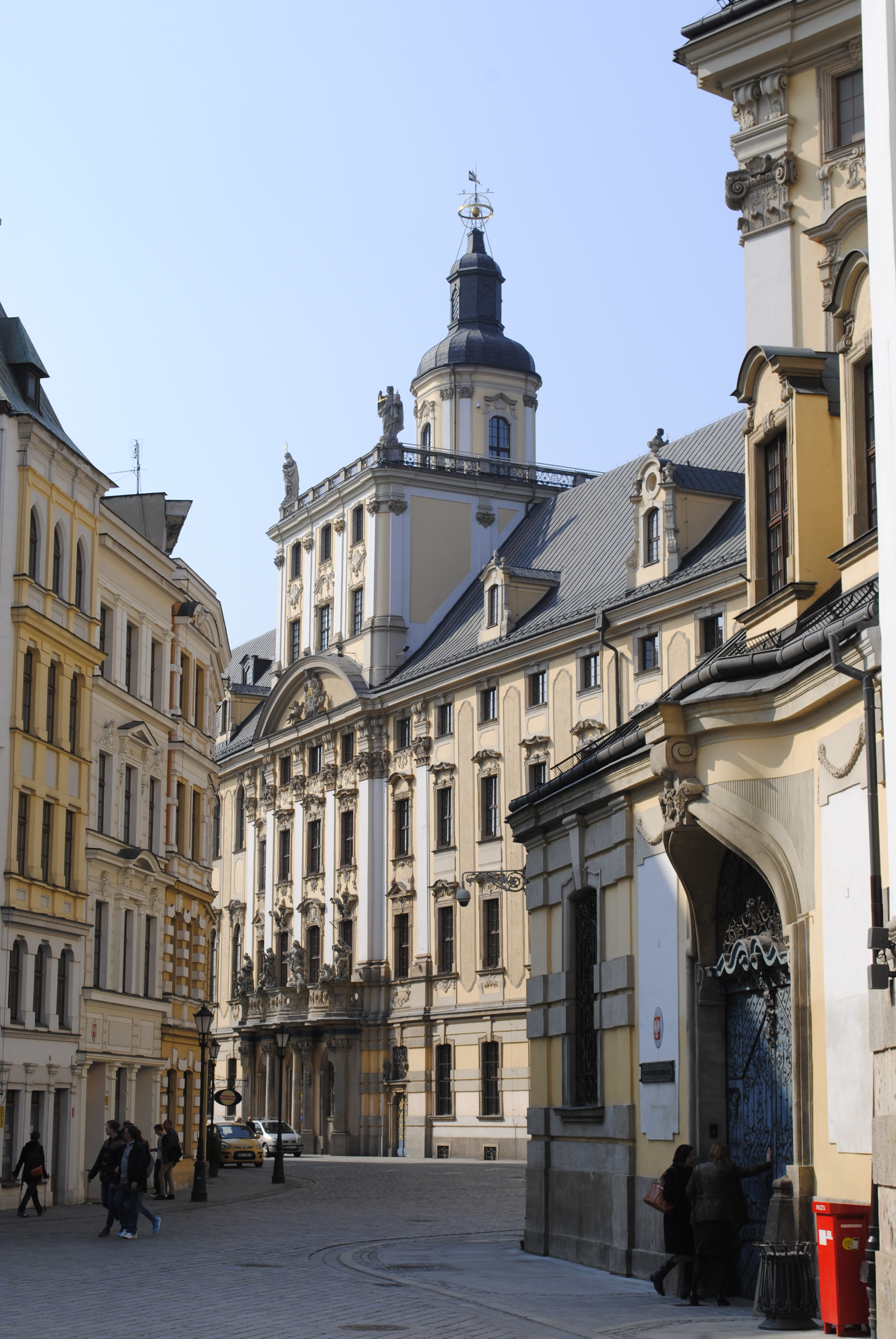
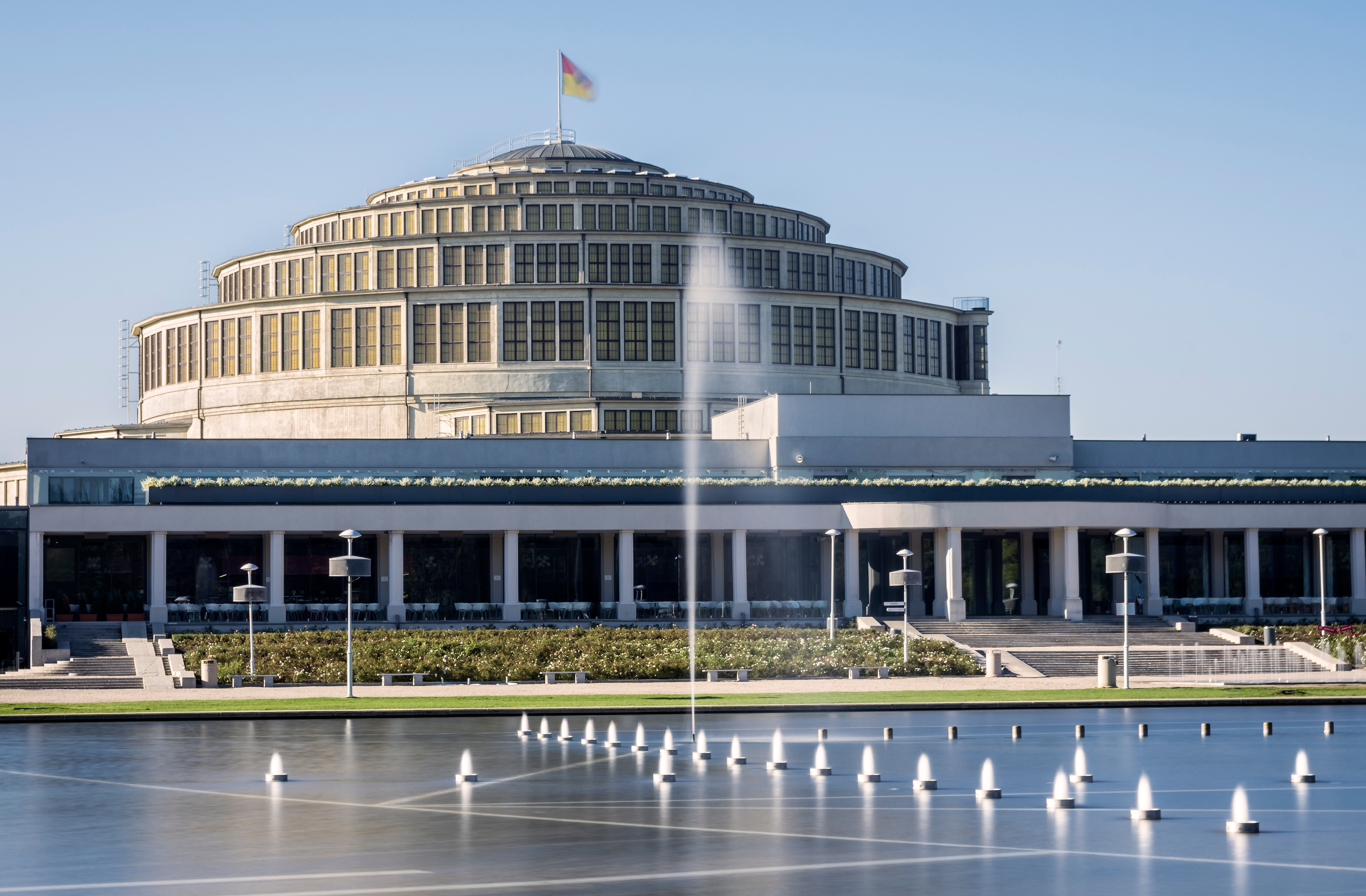
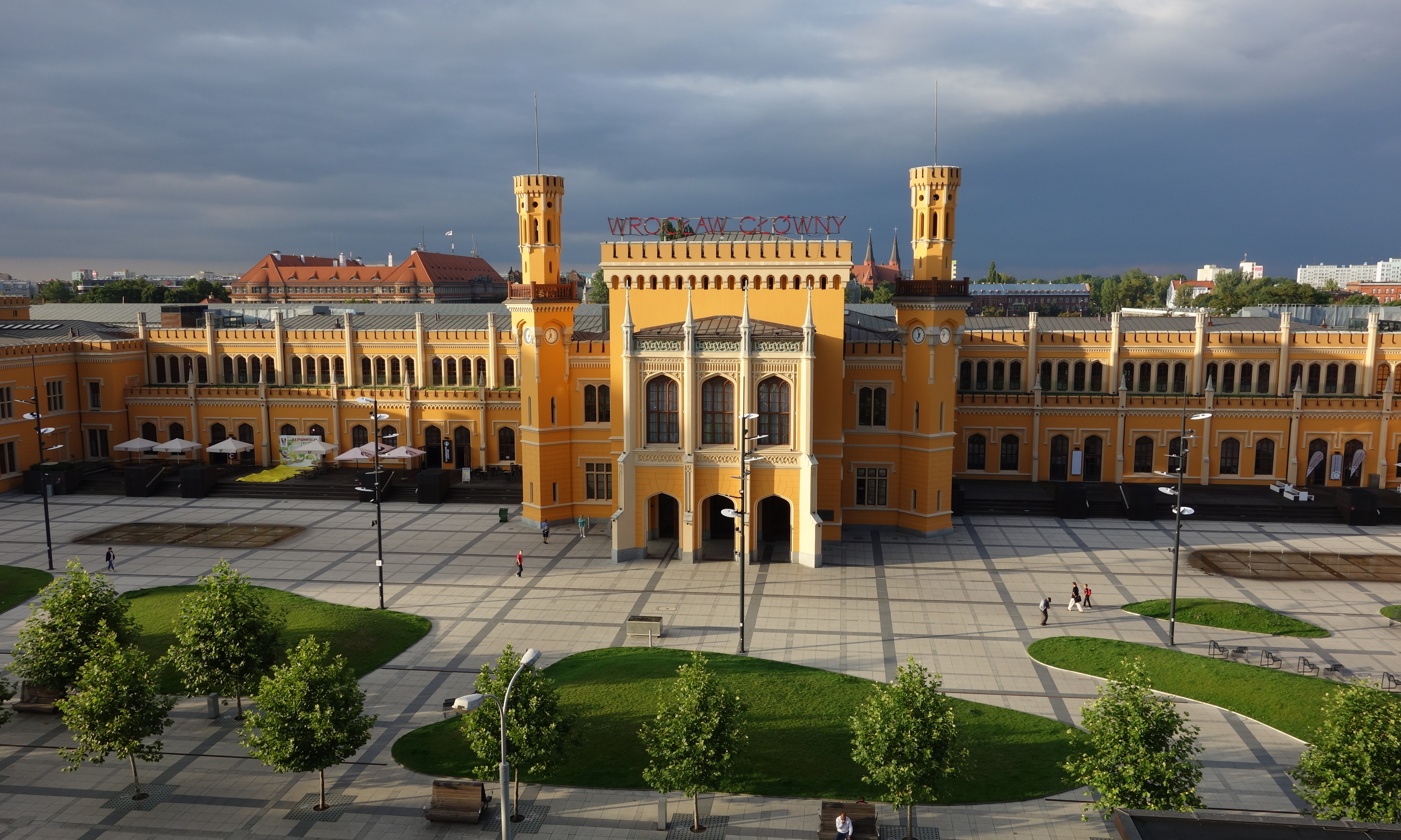
- Cathedral Island with Wrocław Cathedral Town Hall Grunwald Bridge Rynek Puppet Theatre University Centennial Hall Wrocław Główny station

- Flag Coat of arms Brandmark
- Nickname: Miasto Stu Mostów (Polish for 'Wrocław – Hundred Bridge City')
- Motto: Wrocław – miasto spotkań (Polish for 'Wrocław – The Meeting Place')
- Location within Poland
- Coordinates: 51°06′36″N 17°01′57″E
- Country: Poland
- Voivodeship: Lower Silesian
- County: City county
- Established: 10th century
- City rights: 1214
- City Hall: New City Hall
- Districts: 48 districts

Government
  - Body: Wrocław City Council
  - City mayor: Jacek Sutryk (Ind.)

Area
  - City county: 292.81 km^{2} (113.05 sq mi)
  - Metro: 3,627 km^{2} (1,400 sq mi)
- Highest elevation: 155 m (509 ft)
- Lowest elevation: 105 m (344 ft)

Population (30 June 2025)
  - City county: 672,545 (3rd)
  - Density: 2,297/km^{2} (5,950/sq mi)
- Demonym(s): Wrocławian, Vratislavian (en); Wrocławianin (male) (pl); Wrocławianka (female) (pl)

GDP
  - City county: €21.731 billion (2023)
- Time zone: UTC+1 (CET)
  - Summer (DST): UTC+2 (CEST)
- Postal code: 50-041 to 54–612
- Area code: +48 71
- Car plates: DW, DX, VW, VX
- Primary airport: Wrocław Airport
- Website: www.wroclaw.pl

Historic Monument of Poland
- Official name: Historic city centre - Ostrów Tumski, Old Town
- Designated: 1994-09-08
- Reference no.: M.P., 1994, vol. 50, No. 425

Wrocław (Polish: [ˈvrɔt͡swaf]; (Note: Anglicized as UK: /ˈvrɒtswɑːf/ VROT-swahf, US: /ˈvrɔːtswɑːf, -slɑːf/ VRAWT-swahf, -slahf.) German: Breslau [ˈbʁɛslaʊ]; also known by other names) is a city in southwestern Poland, and the capital of the Lower Silesian Voivodeship. It is the largest city and historical capital of the regions of Silesia and Lower Silesia. It lies on the banks of the Oder (Odra) River in the Silesian Lowlands. In 2025, the official population of Wrocław was 672,545, making it the third-largest city in Poland. The population of the Wrocław metropolitan area is around 1.25 million.

The city's history spans more than 1,000 years. It emerged as an early medieval settlement and became part of the Piast-ruled Polish state in the late 10th century, later developing into a major centre of Silesia. From the 13th century, migration from German-speaking regions contributed to the city's development, and German gradually became its predominant language. In the 14th century, the city passed to the Bohemian Crown within the Holy Roman Empire, later coming under Austrian and Prussian rule before becoming part of the German Empire in 1871. In 1945, after World War II, it became part of Poland; most German residents fled or were expelled, and Polish settlers arrived. Wrocław's architecture includes Brick Gothic, Renaissance, Baroque, Historicist and Modernist buildings.

Wrocław is a university city with a student population of over 130,000, making it one of the most youth-oriented cities in the country. Wrocław has numerous historical landmarks, including one of Europe's largest Market Squares and Poland's oldest preserved Town Hall, as well as Cathedral Island, the Bridge of Love, Wrocław Opera, the National Museum and the Centennial Hall, which is listed as a UNESCO World Heritage Site. The Wrocław's dwarfs are a major tourist attraction and have become a symbol of Wrocław. The city is home to the Wrocław Zoo, the oldest zoological garden in Poland.

Wrocław is classified as a Sufficiency global city by GaWC. It was ranked 1st among all medium and small cities in the 2021 European Cities and Regions of the Future ranking by fDi Intelligence. The city is home to Śląsk Wrocław football club and hosted the 2012 European Football Championship. In 2016, the city was a European Capital of Culture and the World Book Capital, and hosted the Theatre Olympics and the European Film Awards. In 2017, the city was host to the World Games. In 2019, it was named a UNESCO City of Literature.

== Names and etymology ==
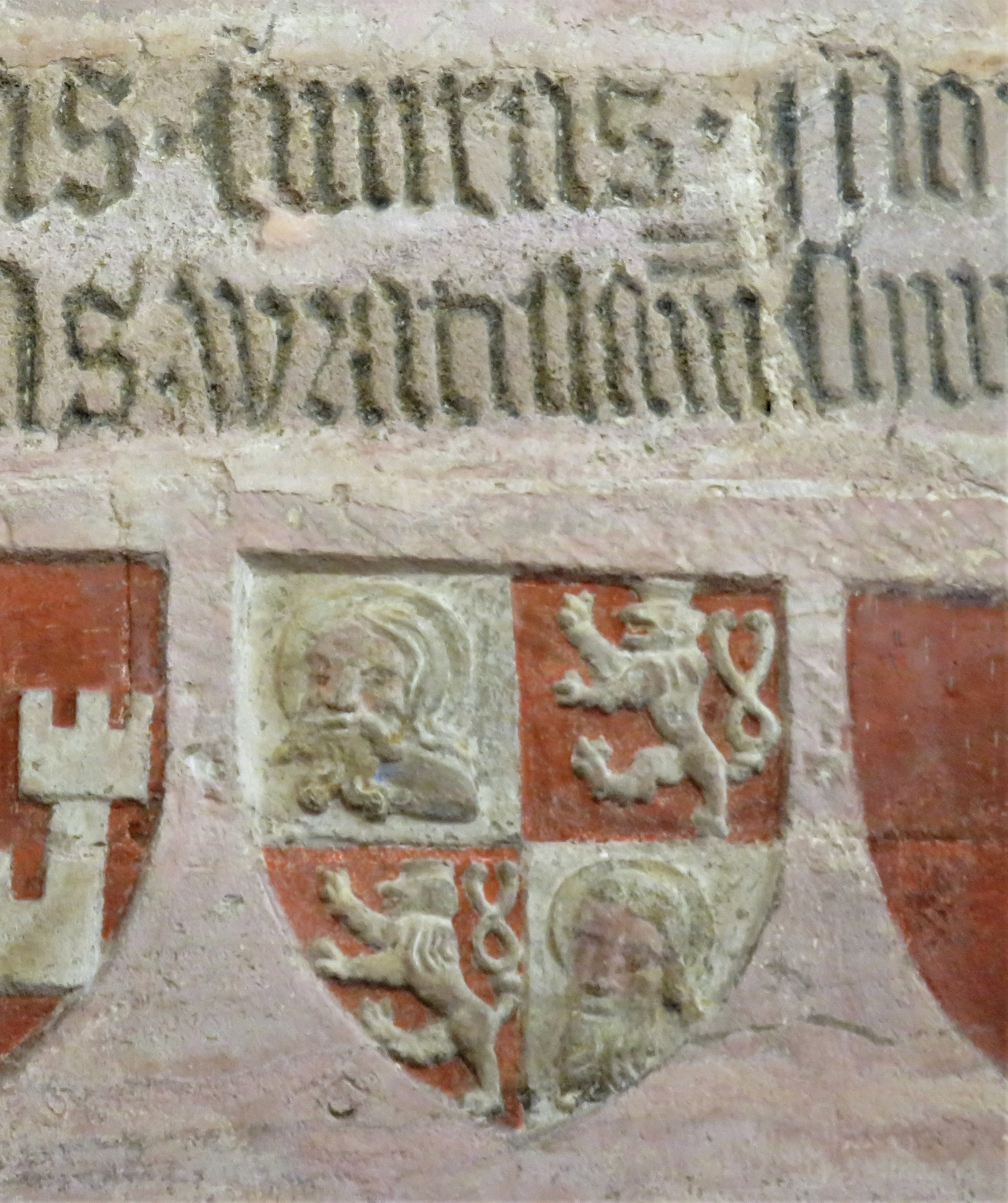
The Coat of arms of Wrocław, with the inscription Civitas Wratislaviensis, in Lauf Castle, c. 1360

The origin of the city's name is debated. It was long believed that the city was named after Duke Vratislav I of Bohemia from the Czech Přemyslid dynasty, who was ruling between 915 and 921. This thesis is contradicted, however, by the fact that the Czechs only took control of the Wrocław gród around the year 945.

The earliest recorded mentions of the city's name, found in Thietmar's Chronicle (Wrotizla, Wordisclavia, Wortizlania, Vaurtizlau), written around the year 1000, indicate the phonetic form of the original name of the city as Wrocisław, derived from the Old Polish given name Wrocisław/Warcisław. According to researchers, this was the name of the city's founder, whom Edmund Małachowicz identified as a duke from the Włost family of Niemcza.

As a result of phonetic changes, the name was later shortened to Wrocław, first recorded in 1175 in the Latinized form Wrezlaw, and it became widespread in the 13th century. Also in the 12th century, a Czech-influenced and Latinized form, Vratislavia, began to appear. The city's first municipal seal was inscribed with Sigillum civitatis Wratislavie.

By the 15th century, the Early New High German variations of the name, Breslau, first began to be used. Despite the noticeable differences in spelling, the numerous German forms were still based on the original West Slavic name of the city, with the Vr- sound being replaced over time by Br-, and the suffix -slav replaced with -slau. These variations included Wrotizla, Vratizlau, Wratislau, Wrezlau, Breßlau or Bresslau among others. A Prussian description from 1819 mentions two names of the city – Polish and German – stating "Breslau (polnisch Wraclaw)".

In other languages, the city's name is: German: Breslau [ˈbʁɛslaʊ]; Silesian German: Brassel; Yiddish: ברעסלוי, romanized: Bresloy; Silesian: Wrocław; modern Czech: Vratislav [ˈvracɪslaf]; Hungarian: Boroszló [ˈborosloː]; and Latin: Wratislavia or Vratislavia and in Old Arabic: رتصلابة, romanized: Ratṣalāba.

People born or resident in the city are known as "Wrocławians" or "Vratislavians" (Polish: wrocławianie). The now little-used German equivalent is "Breslauer".

== History ==
In ancient times, there was a place called Budorigum at or near the site of Wrocław. It was already mapped on Claudius Ptolemy's map of AD 142–147. Settlements in the area existed from the 6th century onward during the migration period. The Ślężans, a West Slavic tribe, settled on the Oder river and erected a fortified gord on Ostrów Tumski.

Wrocław originated at the intersection of two trade routes, the Via Regia and the Amber Road. Archaeological research conducted in the city indicates that it was founded around 940. In 985, Duke Mieszko I of Poland conquered Silesia, and constructed new fortifications on Ostrów. The town was mentioned by Thietmar explicitly in the year 1000 AD in connection with its promotion to an episcopal see during the Congress of Gniezno.

=== Middle Ages ===
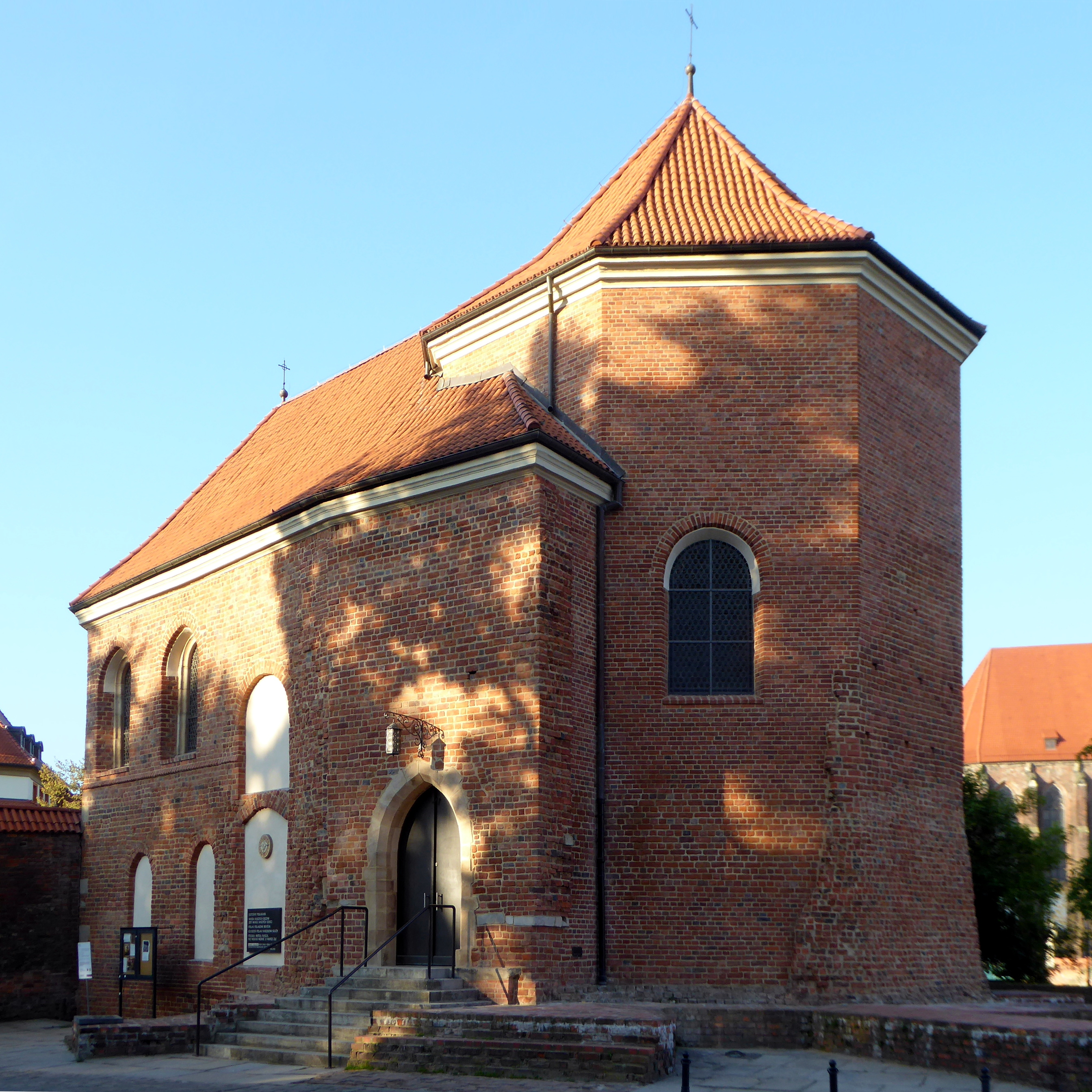
St Martin's Church, the only remaining part of a medieval Piast castle

During Wrocław's early history, control over it changed hands between the Duchy of Bohemia (1038–1054), the Duchy of Poland and the Kingdom of Poland (985–1038 and 1054–1320). Following the fragmentation of the Kingdom of Poland, the Piast dynasty ruled the Duchy of Silesia. One of the most important events during this period was the foundation of the Diocese of Wrocław in 1000. Along with the Bishoprics of Kraków and Kołobrzeg, Wrocław was placed under the Archbishopric of Gniezno in Greater Poland, founded by Pope Sylvester II through the intercession of Polish duke (and later king) Bolesław I the Brave and Emperor Otto III, during the Gniezno Congress. In the years 1034–1038 the city was affected by the pagan reaction in Poland.

The city became a commercial centre and expanded to Wyspa Piasek (Sand Island), and then onto the left bank of the River Oder. Around 1000, the town had about 1,000 inhabitants. In 1109 during the Polish-German war, Prince Bolesław III Wrymouth defeated the King of Germany Henry V at the Battle of Hundsfeld, stopping the German advance into Poland.

The medieval chronicle, Gesta principum Polonorum (1112–1116) by Gallus Anonymus, named Wrocław, along with Kraków and Sandomierz, as one of three capitals of the Polish Kingdom. Also, the Tabula Rogeriana, a book written by the Arab geographer Muhammad al-Idrisi in 1154, describes Wrocław as one of the main Polish cities, alongside Kraków, Gniezno, Sieradz, Łęczyca and Santok. By 1139, a settlement belonging to Governor Piotr Włostowic (also known as Piotr Włast Dunin) was built, and another on the left bank of the River Oder, near the present site of the university. While the city was largely Polish, it also had communities of Bohemians (Czechs), Germans, Walloons and Jews.

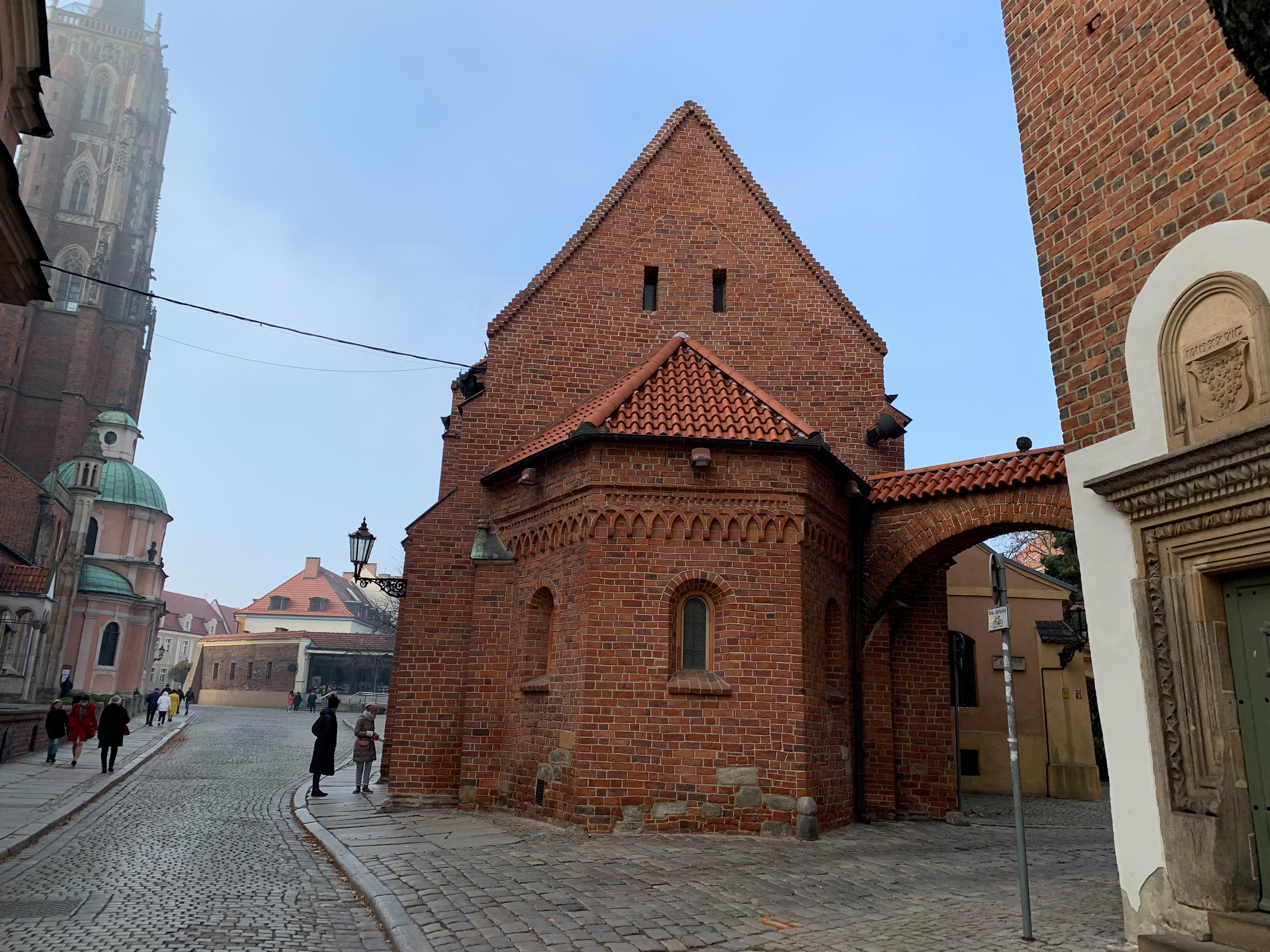
Church of Saint Giles (pl) erected in the 1220s at Ostrów Tumski (Cathedral Island), the city's oldest section

In the 13th century, Wrocław was the political centre of the divided Polish Kingdom. In April 1241, during the first Mongol invasion of Poland, the left-bank part of the city was abandoned by its inhabitants and burnt down for strategic reasons. During the battles with the Mongols Wrocław Castle was successfully defended by Henry II the Pious. In 1245, in Wrocław, Franciscan friar Benedict of Poland, considered one of the first Polish explorers, joined Italian diplomat Giovanni da Pian del Carpine, on his journey to the seat of the Mongol Khan near Karakorum, the capital of the Mongol Empire, in what is considered the first such journey by Europeans.

After the Mongol invasion, the town was partly populated by German settlers who, in the ensuing centuries, gradually became its dominant population. The city, however, retained its multi-ethnic character, a reflection of its importance as a trading post on the junction of the Via Regia and the Amber Road. With the influx of settlers, the town expanded and in 1242 came under German town law. The city council used both Latin and German, and the early forms of the name Breslau, the German name of the city, appeared for the first time in its written records. Polish gradually ceased to be used in the town books, while it survived in the courts until 1337.

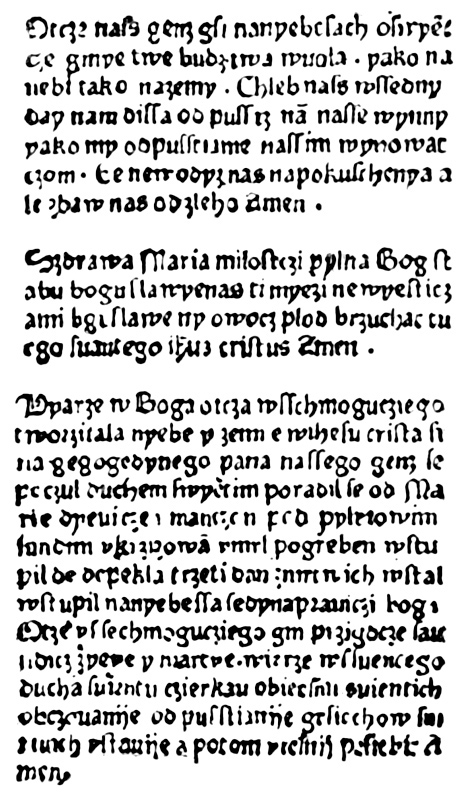
The oldest printed text in the Polish language–Statuta Synodalia Episcoporum Wratislaviensis, printed in Wrocław, 1475

The enlarged town covered around 60 hectares (150 acres), and the new main market square, surrounded by timber-frame houses, became the trade centre of the town. The original foundation, Ostrów Tumski, became its religious centre. The city gained Magdeburg rights in 1261. While the Polish Piast dynasty remained in control of the region, the city council's ability to govern independently had increased. The main source of prosperity was trade between Poland and Ruthenia and Western Europe, and crafts also contributed to the city's wealth. In 1274 prince Henry IV Probus gave the city its staple right. In the 13th century, two Polish monarchs were buried in Wrocław churches founded by them, Henry II the Pious in the St. Vincent church and Henryk IV Probus in the Holy Cross church.

Following an agreement reached in 1327 between Henry VI the Good and John of Bohemia, the Duchy of Wrocław passed directly to the Kingdom of Bohemia upon Henry's death in 1335. In 1337, King John of Bohemia abolished the Zaude (Polish: czuda), a territorial court exercising jurisdiction over people subject to Polish customary law. Its abolition left the district courts as the principal courts above the village level. Major fires struck the city in 1342 and 1344. In 1348, Charles IV, then King of the Romans, formally incorporated most of the Silesian duchies into the Lands of the Bohemian Crown within the Holy Roman Empire. Breslau remained an important centre of long-distance trade, with connections extending to the Netherlands, England, southern Germany, northern Italy, Hungary, Wallachia, Novgorod and Scandinavia. The city had joined the Hanseatic League by 1387. On 5 June 1443, a strong earthquake was felt in the city.

Between 1469 and 1490, Breslau was ruled by Matthias Corvinus, who claimed the title King of Bohemia and ruled parts of the Bohemian Crown Lands. Corvinus was said to have had a Vratislavian mistress who bore him a son. In 1474, after almost a century, the city left the Hanseatic League. Also in 1474, the city was besieged by combined Polish-Czech forces. However, in November 1474, Kings Casimir IV of Poland, his son Vladislaus II of Bohemia, and Matthias Corvinus of Hungary met in the nearby village of Muchobór Wielki (present-day a district of Wrocław), and in December 1474 a ceasefire was signed according to which the city remained under the rule of Corvinus. The following year was marked by the publication in Wrocław of the Statuta Synodalia Episcoporum Wratislaviensium (1475) by Kasper Elyan, the first ever incunable in Polish, containing the proceedings and prayers of the Wrocław bishops.

=== Renaissance and the Reformation ===
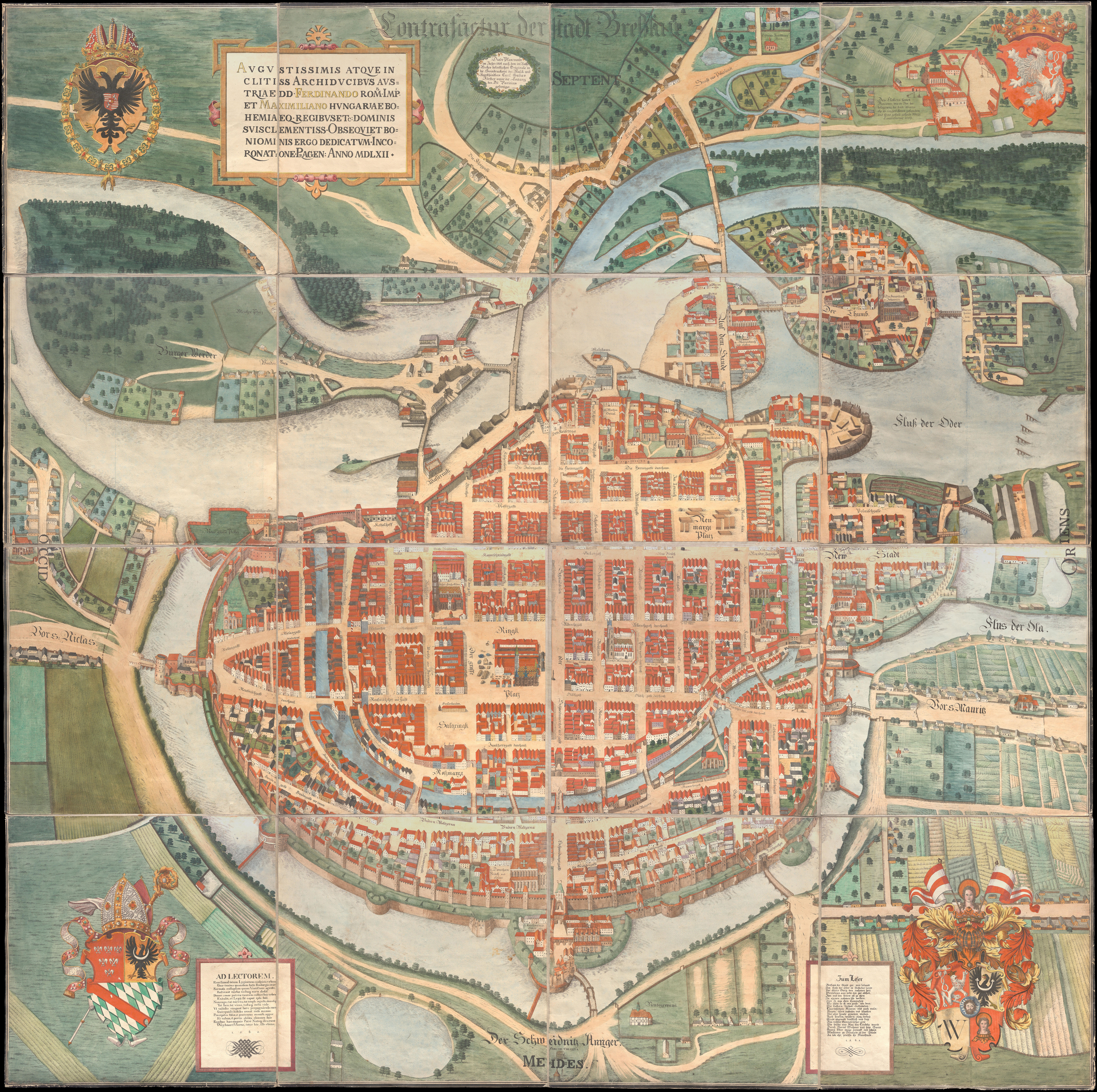
A map of the city from 1562, with its fortifications on the Oder River

In the 16th century, the Breslauer Schöps beer style was created in Breslau. The Protestant Reformation reached the city in 1518 and it converted to the new rite. However, starting in 1526 Silesia was ruled by the Catholic House of Habsburg. In 1618, it supported the Bohemian Revolt out of fear of losing the right to religious freedom. During the ensuing Thirty Years' War, the city was occupied by Saxon and Swedish troops and lost thousands of inhabitants to the plague.

The Emperor brought in the Counter-Reformation by encouraging Catholic orders to settle in the city, starting in 1610 with the Franciscans, followed by the Jesuits, then Capuchins, and finally Ursuline nuns in 1687. These orders erected buildings that shaped the city's appearance until 1945. At the end of the Thirty Years' War, however, it was one of only a few Silesian cities to stay Protestant.

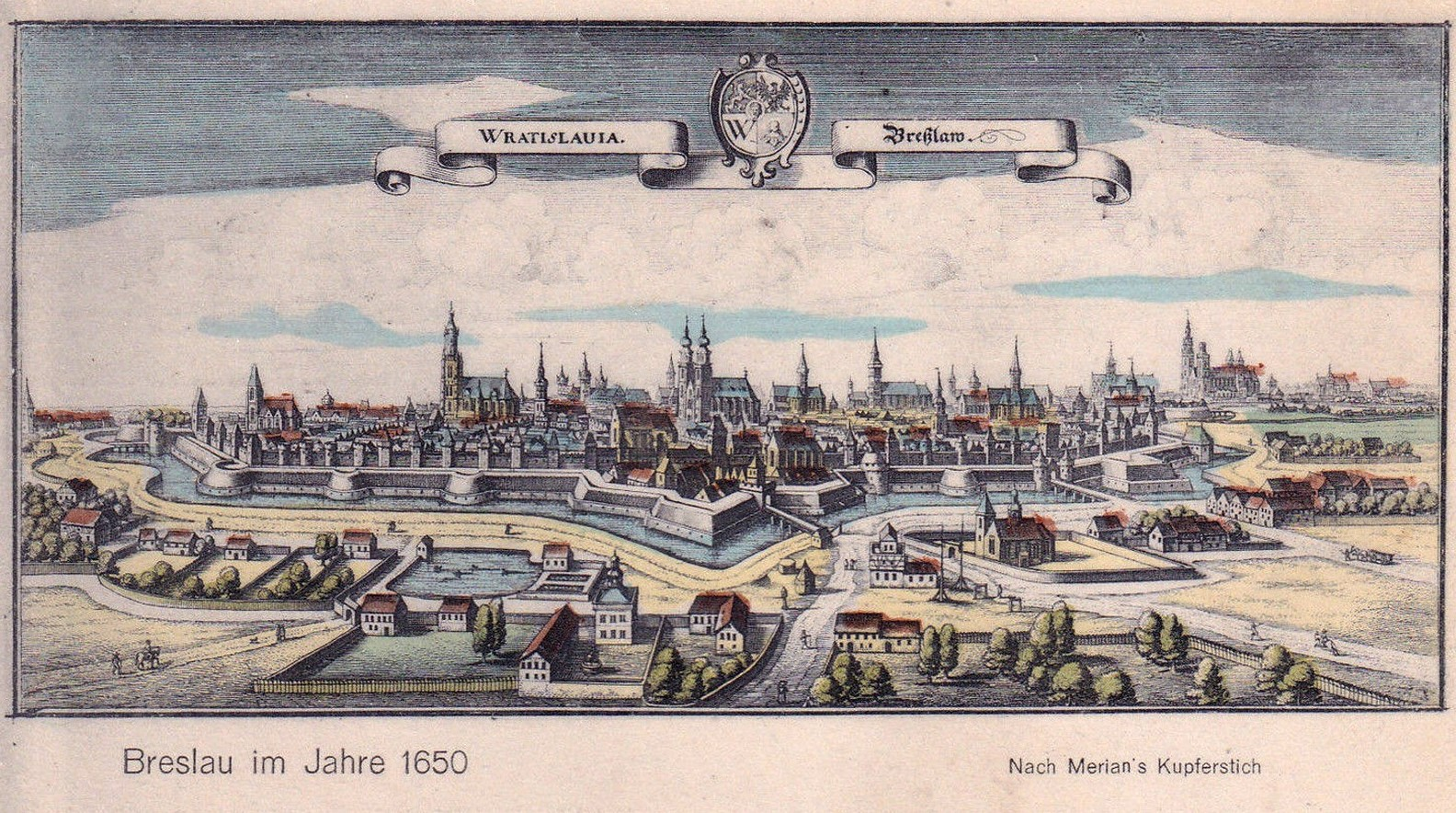
Wrocław 1650

The Polish Municipal school opened in 1666 and lasted until 1766. Precise record-keeping of births and deaths by the city fathers led to the use of their data for analysis of mortality, first by John Graunt and then, based on data provided to him by Breslau professor Caspar Neumann, by Edmond Halley. Halley's tables and analysis, published in 1693, are considered to be the first true actuarial tables, and thus the foundation of modern actuarial science. During the Counter-Reformation, the intellectual life of the city flourished, as the Protestant bourgeoisie lost some of its dominance to the Catholic orders as patrons of the arts.

=== Enlightenment period ===
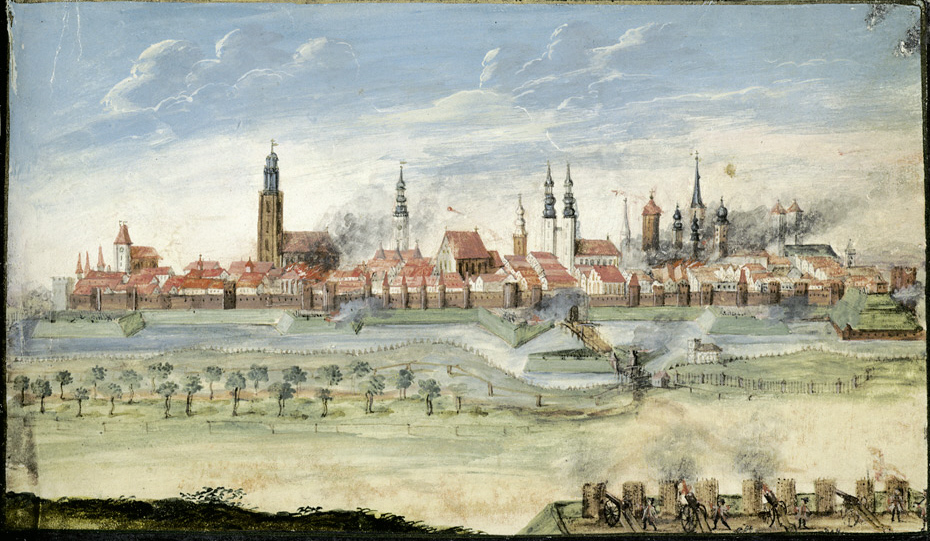
The Battle of Breslau during the Seven Years' War (Third Silesian War 1756–1763)

One of two main routes connecting Warsaw and Dresden ran through the city in the 18th century and Kings Augustus II the Strong and Augustus III of Poland often traveled that route. The city became the centre of German Baroque literature and was home to the First and Second Silesian school of poets. In 1742, the Schlesische Zeitung was founded in Breslau.

In the 1740s the Kingdom of Prussia annexed the city and most of Silesia during the War of the Austrian Succession. Habsburg Empress Maria Theresa ceded most of the territory in the Treaty of Breslau in 1742 to Prussia. Austria attempted to recover Silesia during the Seven Years' War at the Battle of Breslau, but they were unsuccessful. The Venetian Italian adventurer, Giacomo Casanova, stayed in Breslau in 1766.

=== Napoleonic Wars ===
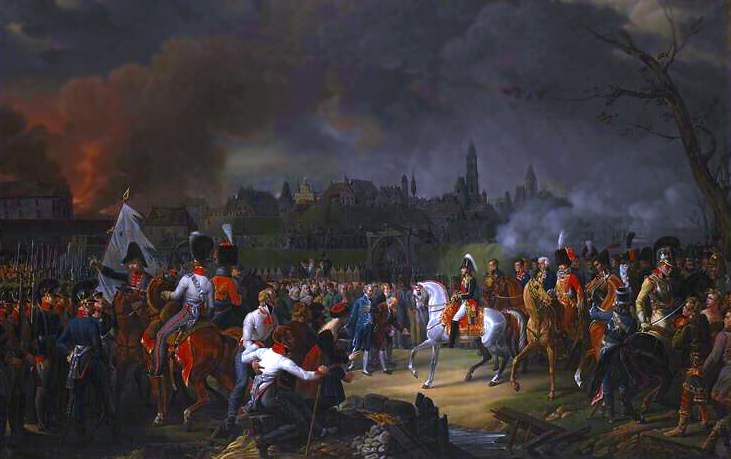
The entry of Prince Jérôme Bonaparte into the city, 7 January 1807

During the Napoleonic Wars, it was occupied by the Confederation of the Rhine army. The fortifications of the city were levelled, and monasteries and cloisters were seized. The Protestant Viadrina European University at Frankfurt an der Oder was relocated to Breslau in 1811, and united with the local Jesuit University to create the new Silesian Frederick-William University (German: Schlesische Friedrich-Wilhelm-Universität, now the University of Wrocław). The city became a centre of the German Liberation movement against Napoleon, and a gathering place for volunteers from all over Germany. The city was the centre of Prussian mobilisation for the campaign which ended at the Battle of Leipzig.

=== Industrial age ===
The Confederation of the Rhine had increased prosperity in Silesia and in the city. The removal of fortifications opened room for the city to expand beyond its former limits. Breslau became an important railway hub and industrial centre, notably for linen and cotton manufacture and the metal industry. The reconstructed university served as a major centre of science; Johannes Brahms later wrote his Academic Festival Overture to thank the university for an honorary doctorate awarded in 1879.

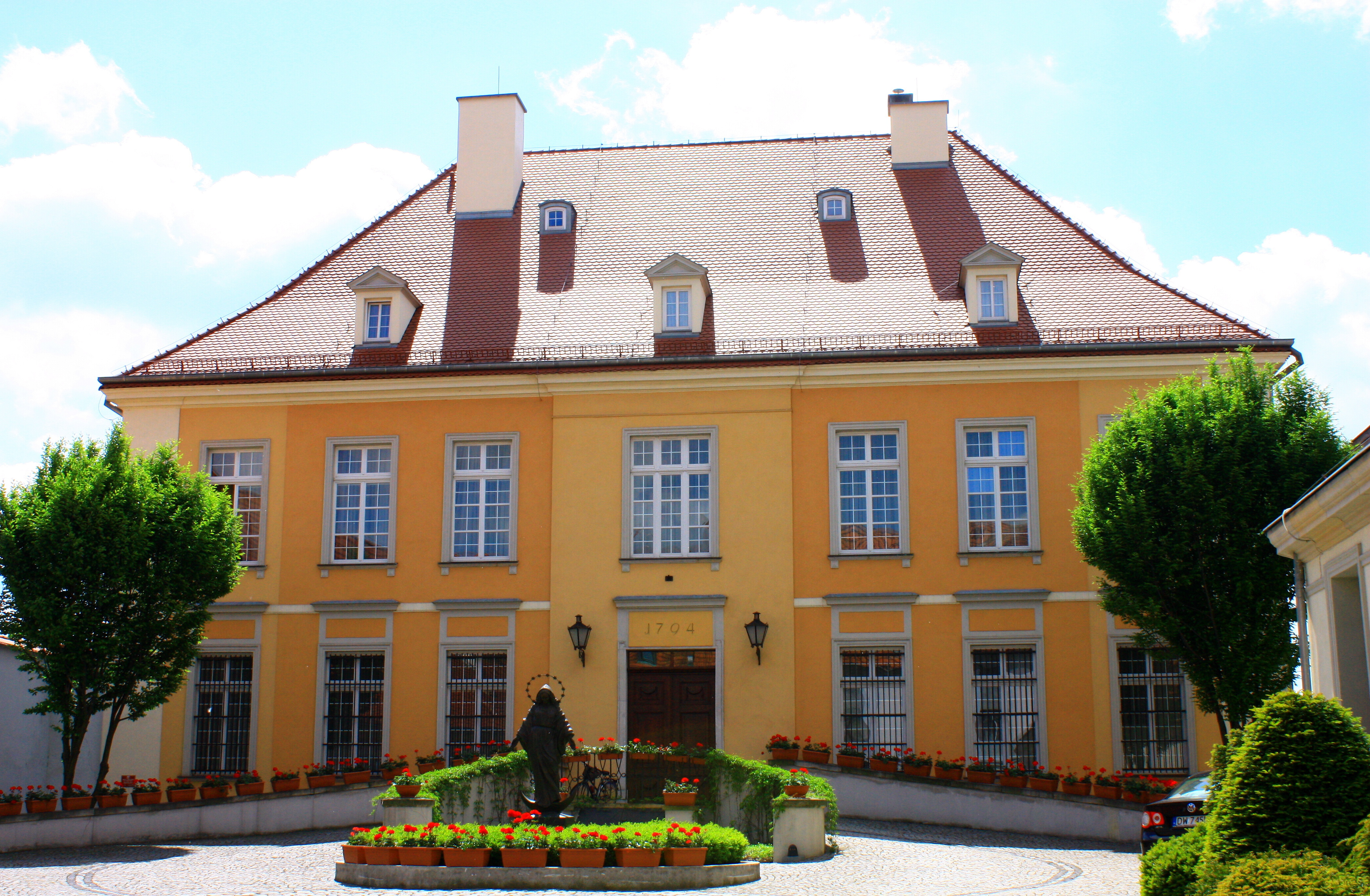
Archbishop's Palace in Wrocław, built in 1794

In 1821, the (Arch)Diocese of Breslau withdrew from dependence on the Polish archbishopric of Gniezno, and became an exempt see. In 1822, the Prussian police discovered the Polonia Polish youth resistance organisation and carried out arrests of its members and searches of their homes. After the unsuccessful Polish November Uprising, the city was an important contact point between partitioned Poland and the Great Emigration in Western Europe. It also remained an important center of Polish printing. In the 1840s, a local branch of the secret Polish organization Związek Plebejuszy (transl. Union of Plebeians) was active. In 1848, many local Polish students joined the Greater Poland uprising against Prussia. On 5 May 1848, a convention of Polish activists from the Prussian and Austrian partitions of Poland was held in the city. On 10 October 1854, the Jewish Theological Seminary opened. The institution was the first modern rabbinical seminary in Central Europe. In 1863 the brothers Carl and Louis Stangen founded the travel agency Stangen, the second travel agency in the world. The city was subjected to Germanisation policies, yet it retained a sizeable Polish population.

The city was an important centre of the Polish secret resistance movement and the seat of a Polish uprising committee before and during the January Uprising of 1863–1864 in the Russian Partition of Poland. Local Poles took part in Polish national mourning after the Russian massacre of Polish protesters in Warsaw in February 1861, and also organised several patriotic Polish church services throughout 1861. Secret Polish correspondence, weapons, and insurgents were transported through the city.

After the outbreak of the uprising in 1863, the Prussian police carried out mass searches of Polish homes, especially those of Poles who had recently come to the city. The city's inhabitants, both Poles and Germans, excluding the German aristocracy, largely sympathised with the uprising, and some Germans even joined local Poles in their secret activities. In June 1863 the city was officially confirmed as the seat of secret Polish insurgent authorities. In January 1864, the Prussian police arrested a number of members of the Polish insurgent movement.

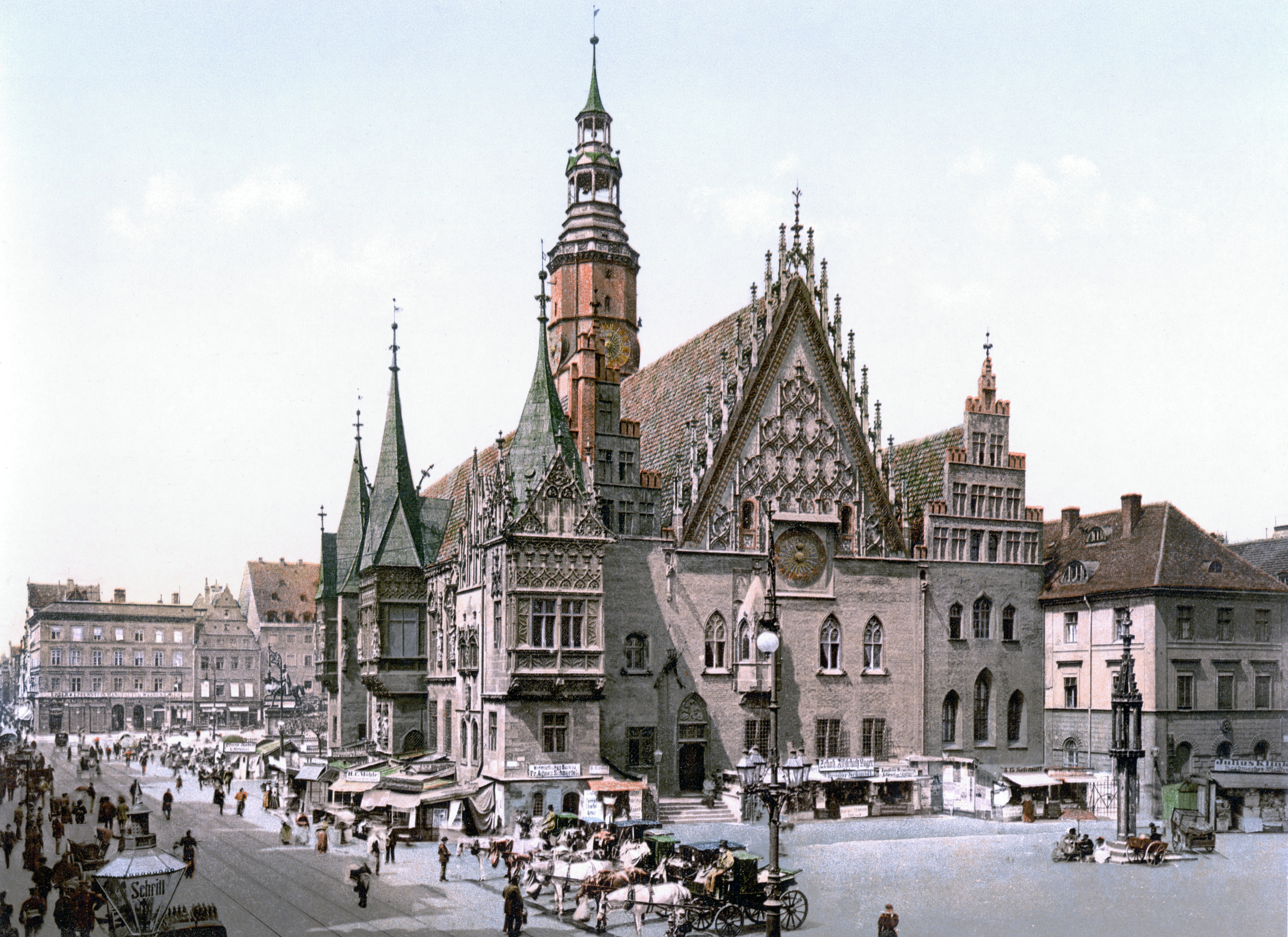
Old Town Hall, 1900

The Unification of Germany in 1871 turned Breslau into the sixth-largest city in the German Empire. Its population more than tripled to over half a million between 1860 and 1910. The 1900 census listed 422,709 residents.

In 1890, construction began of Breslau Fortress as the city's defences. Important landmarks were inaugurated in 1910, the Kaiser bridge (today Grunwald Bridge) and the Technical University, which now houses the Wrocław University of Technology. The 1910 census listed 95.7% of the population as German-speakers, with 15,107 Polish-speakers (3%), and 3,431 (0.7%) as bilingual in Polish and German, although some estimates put the number of Poles in the city at the time at 20,000 to 30,000. The population was 58% Protestant, 37% Catholic (including at least 2% Polish) and 5% Jewish (totaling 20,536 in the 1905 census). The Jewish community of Breslau was among the most important in Germany, producing several distinguished artists and scientists.

From 1912, the head of the university's Department of Psychiatry and director of the Clinic of Psychiatry (Königlich Psychiatrischen und Nervenklinik) was Alois Alzheimer and, that same year, professor William Stern introduced the concept of IQ.

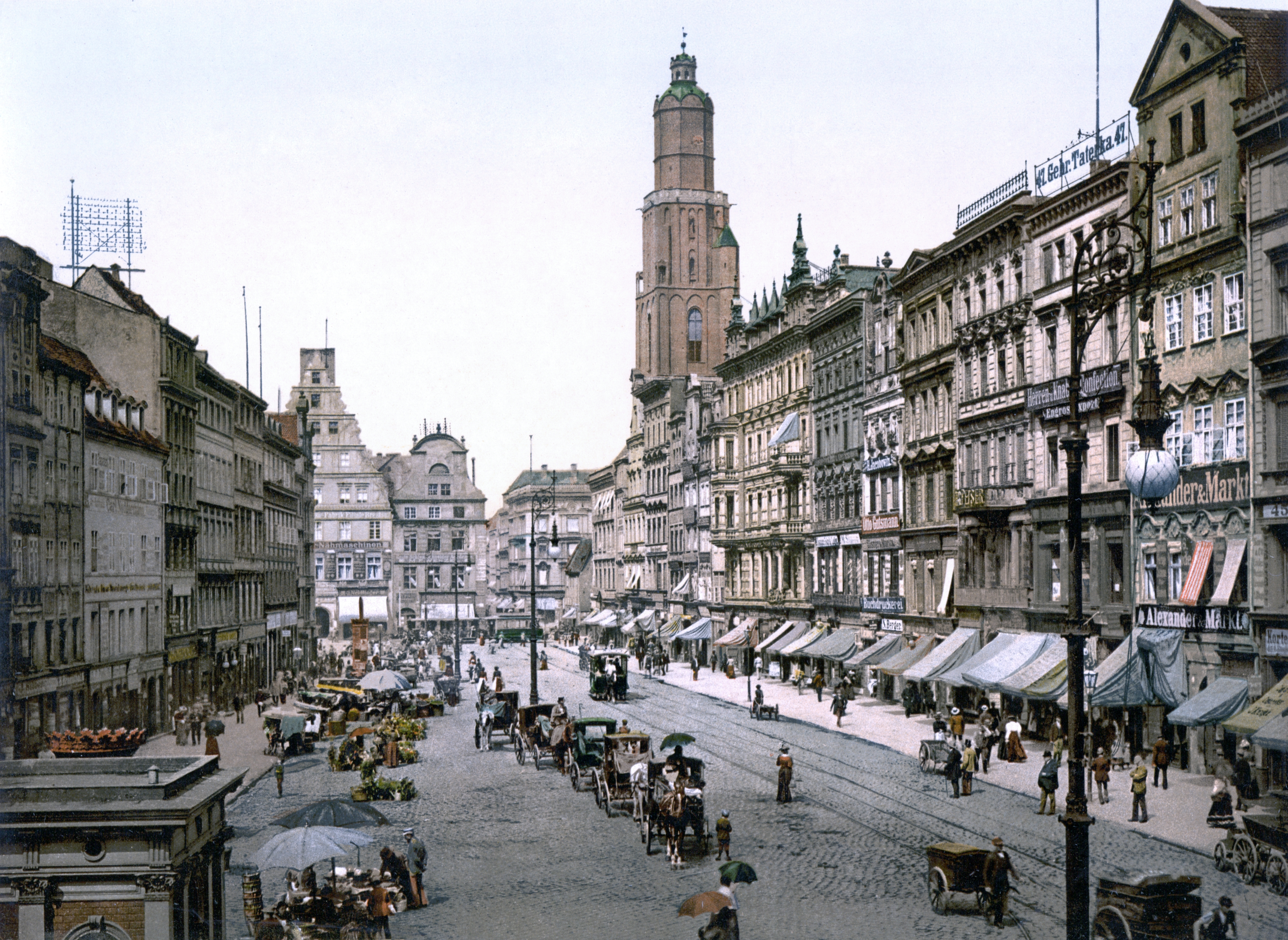
Market Square, 1890–1900

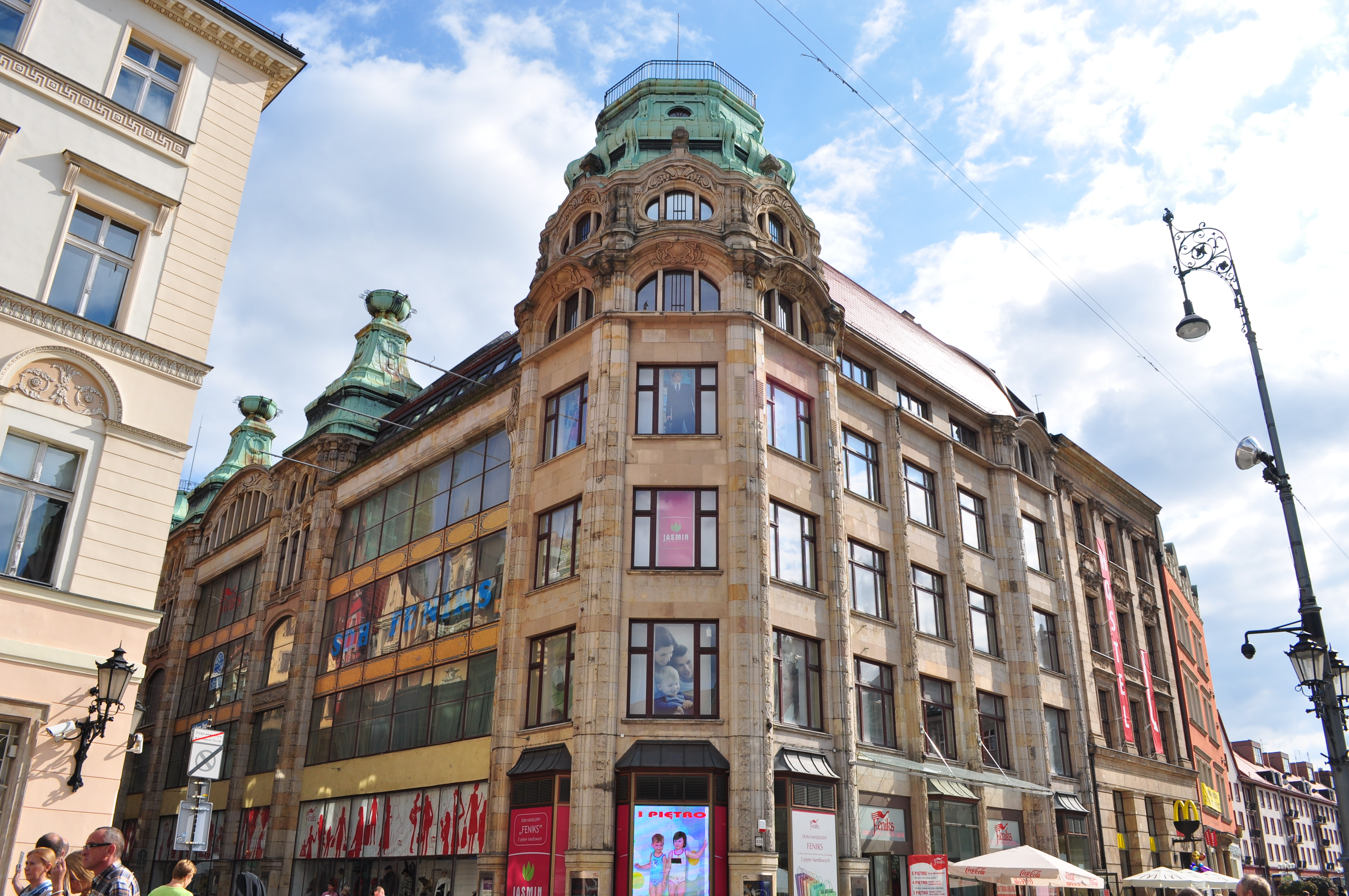
Feniks Department Store, built in 1902–1904

In 1913, the newly built Centennial Hall housed an exhibition commemorating the 100th anniversary of the historical German Wars of Liberation against Napoleon and the first award of the Iron Cross. The Centennial Hall was built by Max Berg (1870–1947), since 2006 it is part of the world heritage of UNESCO. The central station (by Wilhelm Grapow, 1857) was one of the biggest in Germany and one of the first stations with electrified railway services. Since 1900 modern department stores like Barasch (today "Feniks") or Petersdorff (built by architect Erich Mendelsohn) were erected.

=== First World War and interwar period ===
During World War I, in 1914, a branch of the Organizacja Pomocy Legionom ("Legion Assistance Organisation") operated in the city with the goal of gaining support and recruiting volunteers for the Polish Legion, but three Legions' envoys were arrested by the Germans in November 1914 and deported to Austria, and the organisation soon ended its activities in the city. During the war, the German administration operated seven forced labour camps for Allied prisoners of war in the city.

Following the war, Breslau became the capital of the newly created Prussian Province of Lower Silesia of the Weimar Republic in 1919. After the war the Polish community began holding masses in Polish at the Church of Saint Anne, and, as of 1921, at St. Martin's and a Polish School was founded by Helena Adamczewska. In 1920 a Polish consulate was opened on the Main Square. In August 1920, during the Polish Silesian Uprising in Upper Silesia, the Polish Consulate and School were destroyed, while the Polish Library was burned down by a mob. The number of Poles as a percentage of the total population fell to just 0.5% after the re-emergence of Poland as a state in 1918, when many moved to Poland. Antisemitic riots occurred in 1923.

The city boundaries were expanded between 1925 and 1930 to include an area of 175 km^{2} (68 sq mi) with a population of 600,000. In 1929, the Werkbund opened WuWa (German: Wohnungs- und Werkraumausstellung) in Breslau-Scheitnig, an international showcase of modern architecture by architects of the Silesian branch of the Werkbund. In June 1930, Breslau hosted the Deutsche Kampfspiele, a sporting event for German athletes after Germany was excluded from the Olympic Games after World War I. The number of Jews remaining in Breslau fell from 23,240 in 1925 to 10,659 in 1933. Up to the beginning of World War II, Breslau was the largest city in Germany east of Berlin with important companies of textile manufacturing and mechanical engineering.

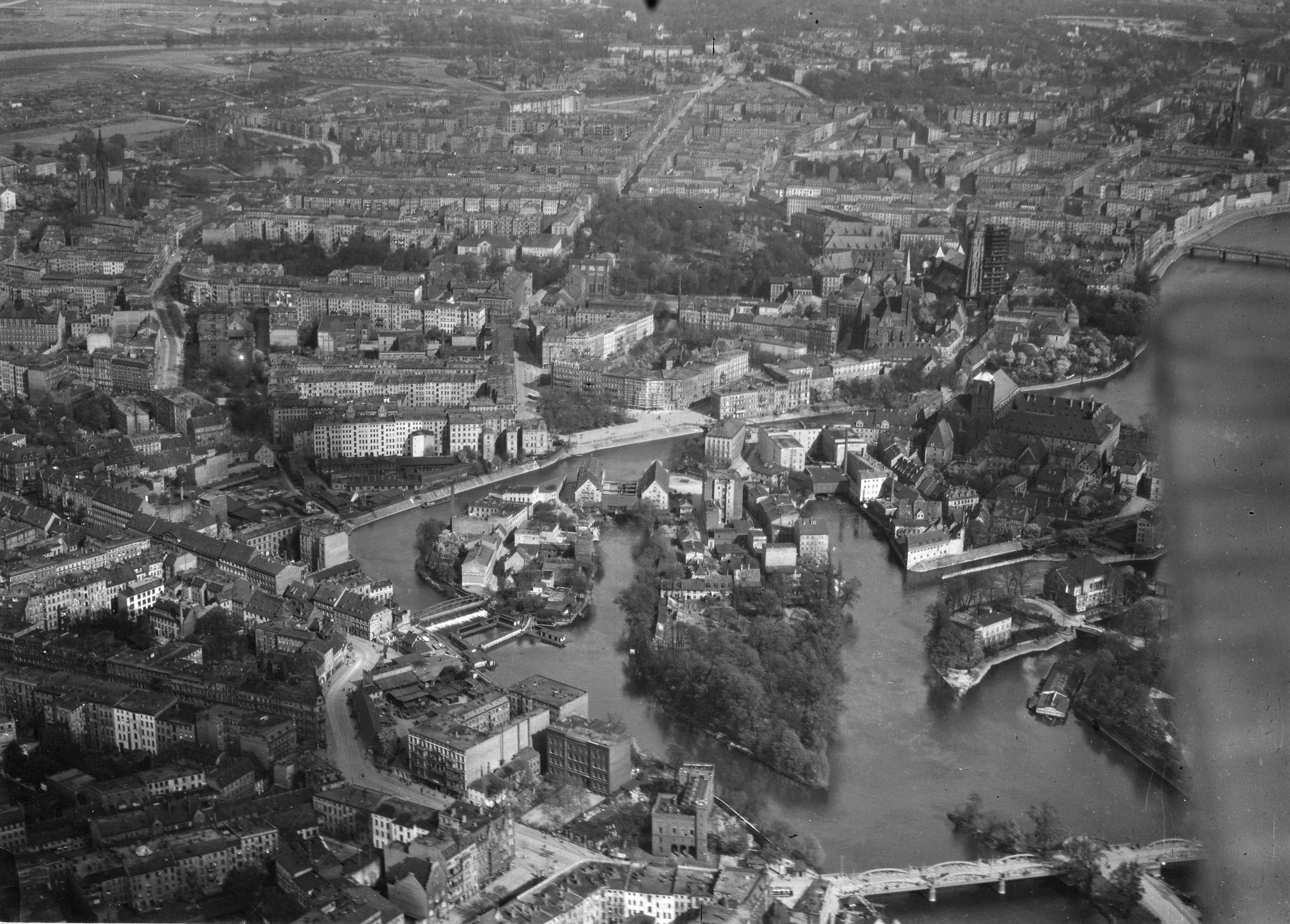
A pre-war aerial view of the city, 1920

Known as a stronghold of left wing liberalism during the German Empire, Breslau eventually became one of the strongest support bases of the Nazi Party, which in the 1932 elections received 44% of the city's vote, their third-highest total in all Germany.

After Hitler's appointment as German Chancellor in 1933, political enemies of the Nazis were persecuted, and their institutions closed or destroyed. KZ Dürrgoy, one of the first concentration camps in Nazi Germany, was set up in the city in 1933. The Gestapo began actions against Polish and Jewish students (see: Jewish Theological Seminary of Breslau), Communists, Social Democrats, and trade unionists. Arrests were made for speaking Polish in public, and in 1938 the Nazi-controlled police destroyed the Polish cultural centre.

In June 1939, Polish students were expelled from the university. Also many other people seen as "undesirable" by Nazi Germany were sent to concentration camps. A network of concentration camps and forced labour camps was established around Breslau to serve industrial concerns, including FAMO, Junkers, and Krupp. Tens of thousands of forced labourers were imprisoned there.

The last big event organised by the National Socialist League of the Reich for Physical Exercise, called Deutsches Turn-und-Sportfest (Gym and Sports Festivities), took place in Breslau from 23 to 31 July 1938. The Sportsfest was held to commemorate the 125th anniversary of the German Wars of Liberation against Napoleon's invasion.

=== Second World War ===
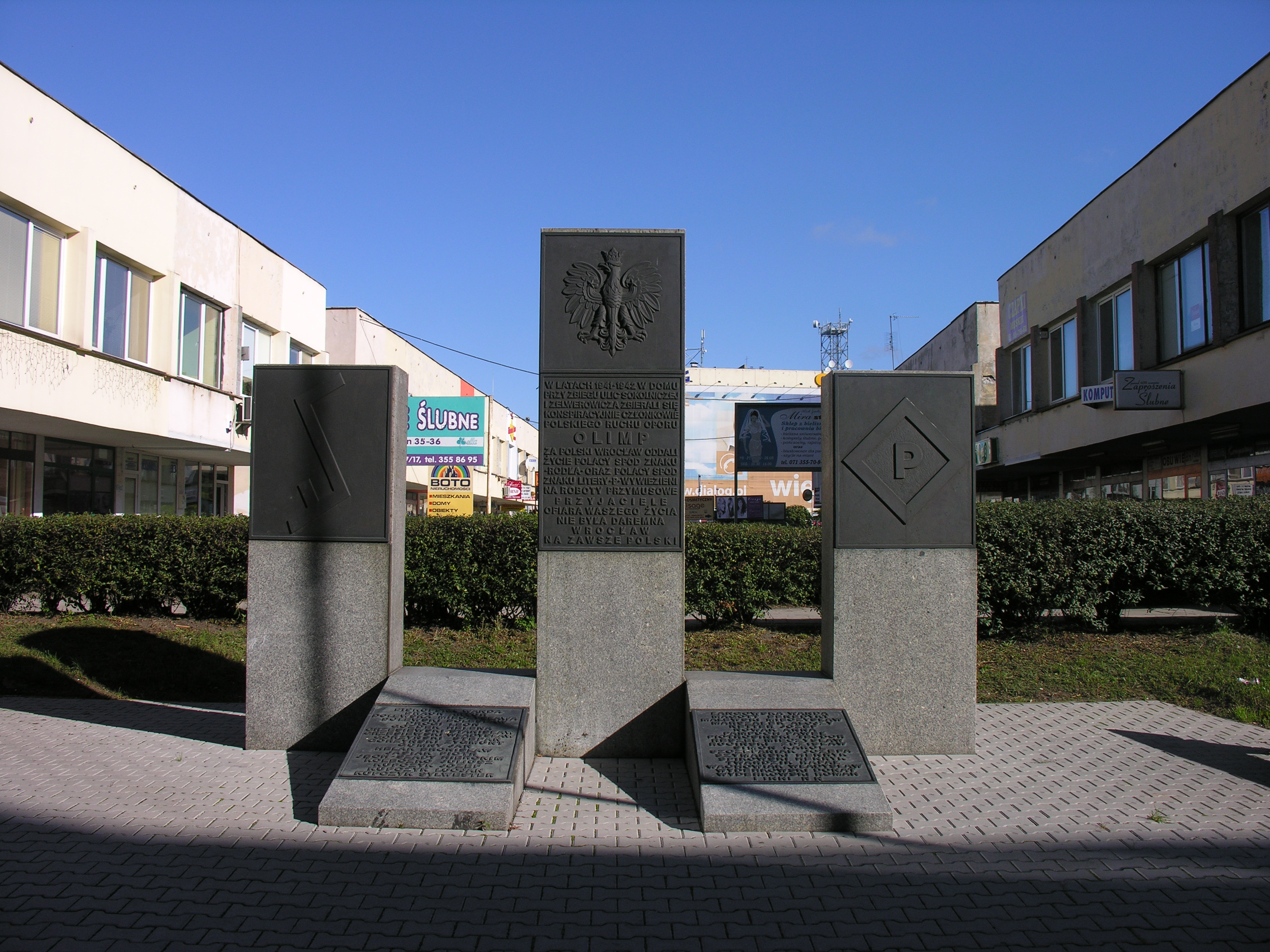
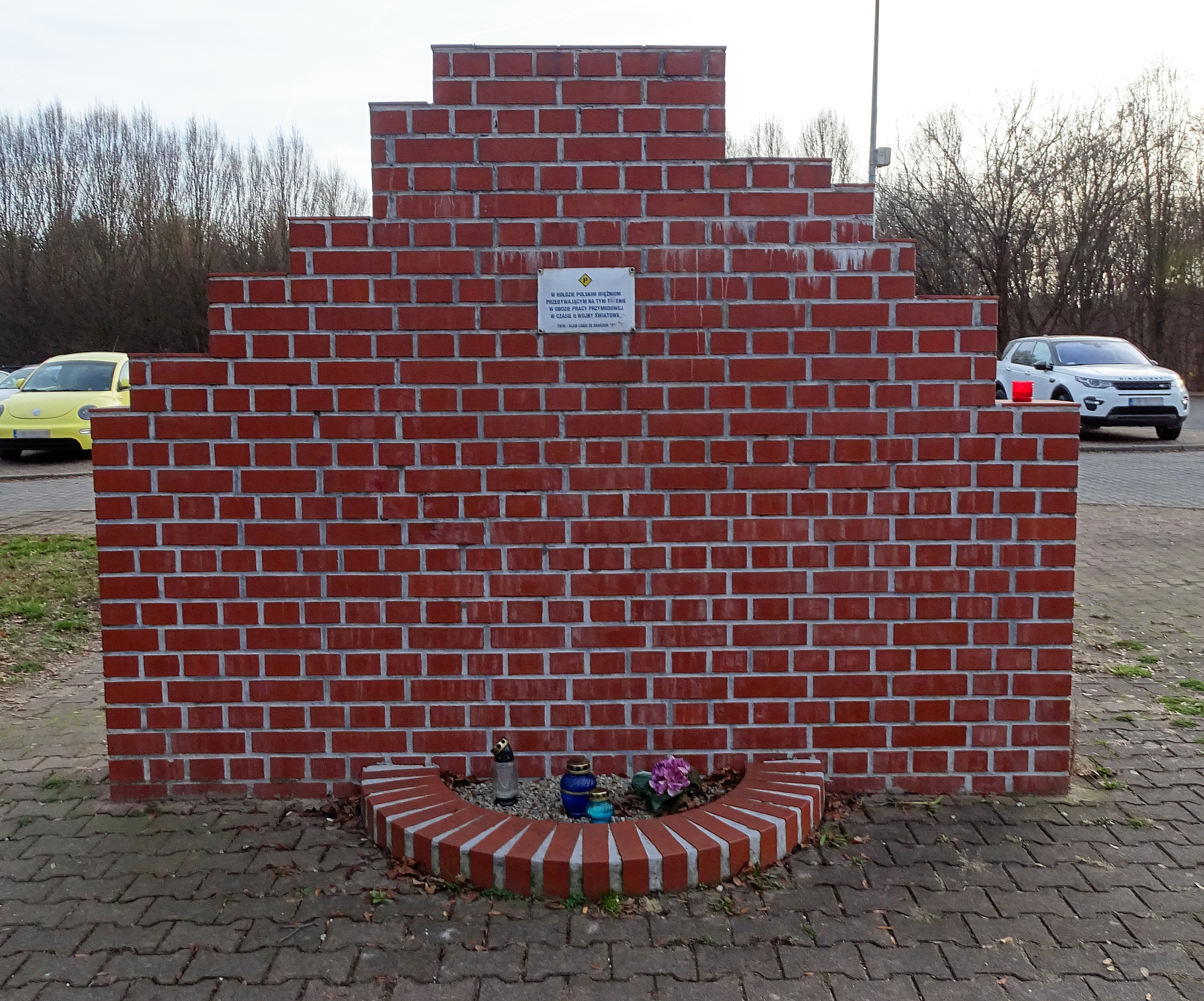
Memorials to the Olimp resistance organization and to victims of a local forced labour camp

During the invasion of Poland, which started World War II, in September 1939, the Germans carried out mass arrests of local Polish activists and banned Polish organisations, and the city was made the headquarters of the southern district of the Selbstschutz, whose task was to persecute Poles. In November 1939, the Germans imprisoned 173 Polish professors and lecturers from Kraków's universities in the city, and then deported them to the Sachsenhausen concentration camp (see Sonderaktion Krakau). For most of the war, the fighting did not affect the city. During the war, the Germans opened the graves of medieval Polish monarchs and local dukes to carry out anthropological research for propaganda purposes, wanting to demonstrate German "racial purity". The remains were transported to other places, and they have not been found to this day.

In 1941, the remnants of the pre-war Polish minority in the city, as well as Polish slave labourers, organised a resistance group called Olimp. The organisation gathered intelligence, carrying out sabotage and organising aid for Polish slave workers. In September 1941 the city's 10,000 Jews were expelled from their homes and soon deported to concentration camps. Few survived the Holocaust. As the war continued, refugees from bombed-out German cities, and later refugees from farther east, swelled the population to nearly one million, including 51,000 forced labourers in 1944, and 9,876 Allied PoWs. At the end of 1944 an additional 30,000–60,000 Poles were moved into the city after the Germans crushed the Warsaw Uprising.

During the war the German administration operated four subcamps of the Gross-Rosen concentration camp in the city. Approximately 3,400–3,800 men were imprisoned in three subcamps, among them Poles, Russians, Italians, Frenchmen, Ukrainians, Czechs, Belgians, Yugoslavs, Dutchmen, Chinese, and about 1,500 Jewish women were imprisoned in the fourth camp. Many prisoners died, and the remaining were evacuated to the main camp of Gross-Rosen in January 1945. There were also three subcamps of the Stalag VIII-B/344 prisoner-of-war camp, three subcamps of the Stalag VIII-C POW camp, and two Nazi prisons in the city, including a youth prison, with multiple forced labour subcamps.

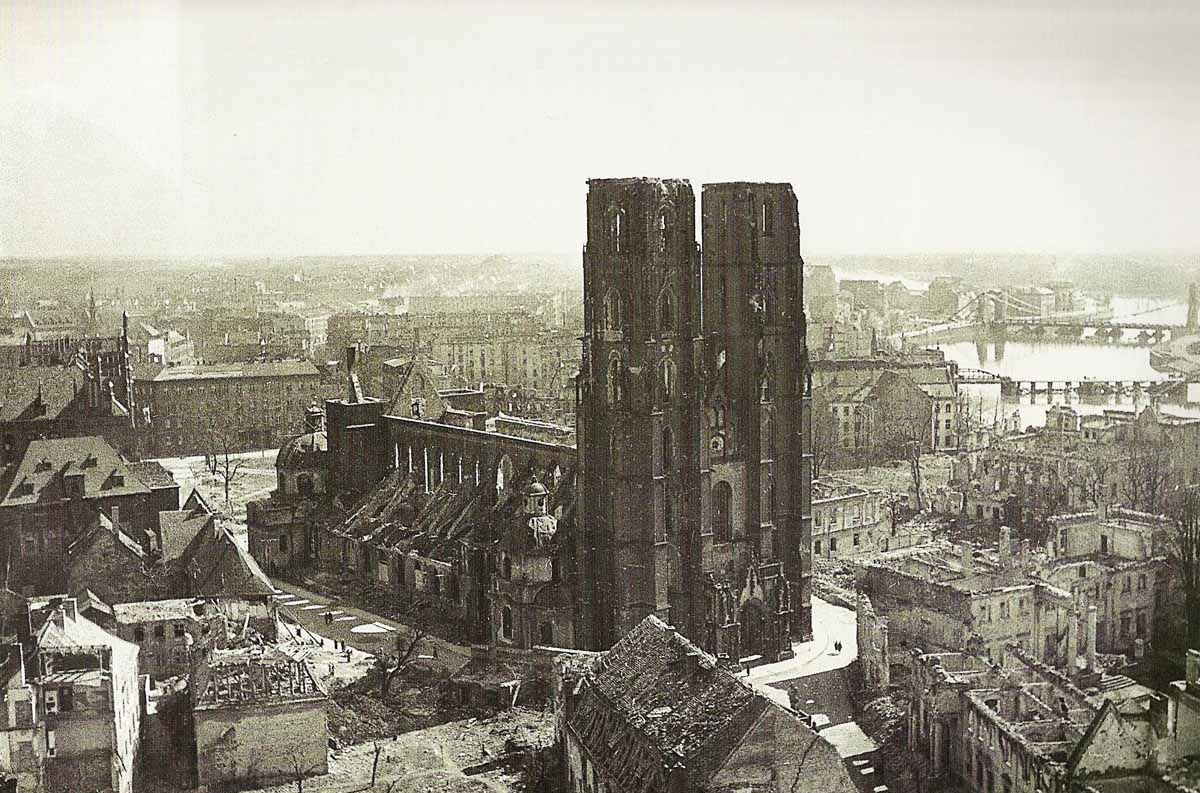
Wartime destruction around the cathedral, 1945

In 1945, the city became part of the front lines and was the site of the brutal Siege of Breslau. Adolf Hitler had in 1944 declared Breslau to be a fortress (Festung), to be held at all costs. An attempted evacuation of the city took place in January 1945, with 18,000 people freezing to death in icy snowstorms of −20 °C (−4 °F) weather. In February 1945, the Soviet Army approached the city and the German Luftwaffe began an airlift to the besieged garrison. A large area of the city centre was demolished and turned into an airfield by the defenders. By the end of the three-month siege in May 1945, half the city had been destroyed. Breslau was the last major city in Germany to surrender, capitulating only two days before the end of the war in Europe. Civilian deaths amounted to as many as 80,000. In August the Soviets placed the city under the control of German communists.

Following the Yalta Conference held in February 1945, where the new geopolitics of Central Europe were decided, the terms of the Potsdam Conference decreed that along with almost all of Lower Silesia, the city would become again part of Poland in exchange for Poland's loss of the city of Lwów along with the massive territory of Kresy in the east, which was annexed by the Soviet Union. The Polish name of Wrocław was declared official. There had been discussion among the Western Allies to place the southern Polish-German boundary on the Eastern Neisse, which meant post-war Germany would have been allowed to retain approximately half of Silesia, including those parts of Breslau that lay on the west bank of the Oder. However, the Soviet government insisted the border be drawn at the Lusatian Neisse farther west.

=== 1945–present ===
The city's German inhabitants who were not forced to flee, or could not return to their home city after the war had ended, were expelled between 1945 and 1949 and were settled in the Soviet occupation zone or in the Allied Occupation Zones in the remainder of Germany. The city's last pre-war German school was closed in 1963.

The Polish population was dramatically increased by the resettlement of Poles, partly due to postwar population transfers during the forced deportations from Polish lands annexed by the Soviet Union in the east region, some of whom came from Lviv (Lwów), Volhynia, and the Vilnius Region. However, despite the prime role given to re-settlers from the Kresy, in 1949, only 20% of the new Polish population actually were refugees themselves. A small German minority (about 1,000 people, or 0.2% of the population) remains in the city, so that today the proportion of the Polish population compared to that of the Germans is the reverse of what it was a hundred years ago. Traces of the German past, such as inscriptions and signs, were removed. In 1948, Wrocław organised the Recovered Territories Exhibition and the World Congress of Intellectuals in Defence of Peace. Picasso's lithograph, La Colombe (The Dove), a traditional, realistic picture of a pigeon, without an olive branch, was created on a napkin at the Monopol Hotel in Wrocław during the World Congress of Intellectuals in Defence of Peace.

In 1963, Wrocław was declared a closed city because of a smallpox epidemic.

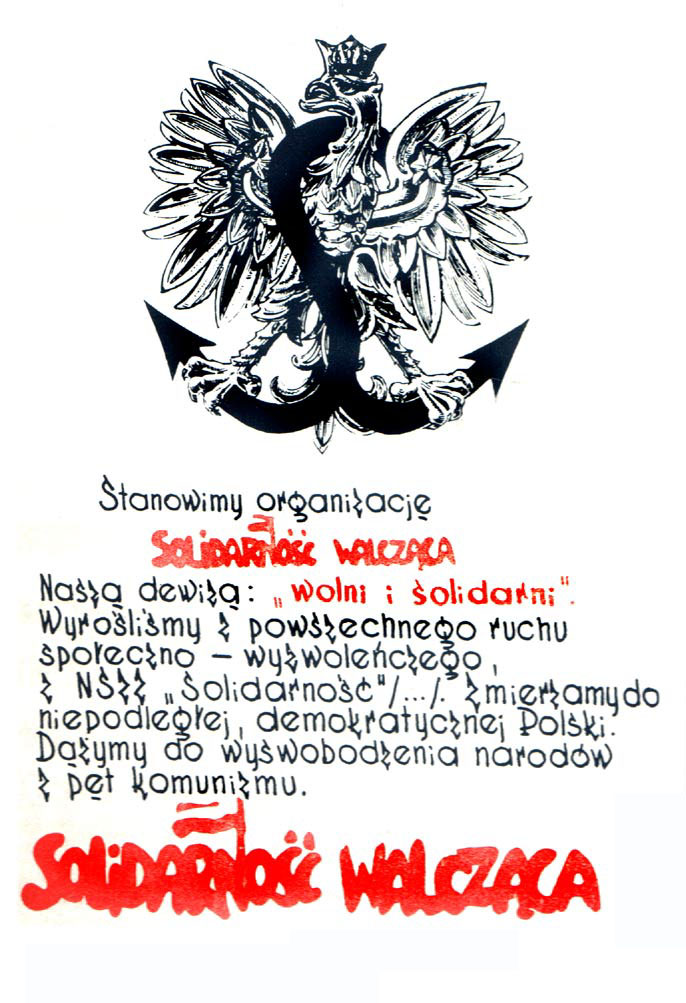
Fighting Solidarity logo

In 1982, during martial law in Poland, the anti-communist underground organisations Fighting Solidarity and Orange Alternative were founded in Wrocław. Wrocław's dwarves, made of bronze, famously grew out of and commemorate Orange Alternative.

In 1983 and 1997, Pope John Paul II visited the city.

PTV Echo, the first non-state television station in Poland and in the post-communist countries, began to broadcast in Wrocław on 6 February 1990.

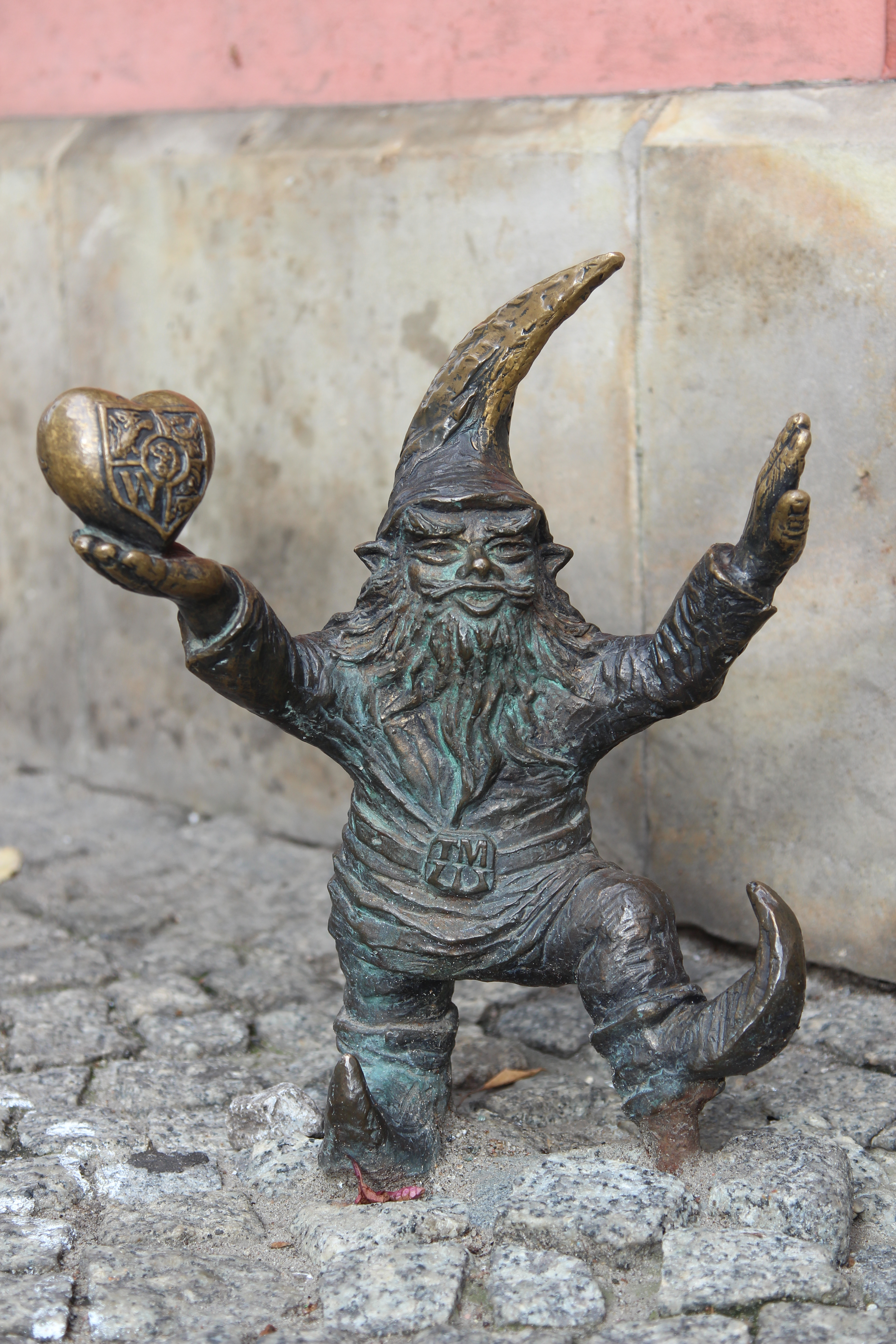
A Wrocław dwarf

In May 1997, Wrocław hosted the 46th International Eucharistic Congress.

In July 1997, the city was heavily affected by the Millennium Flood, the worst flooding in post-war Poland, Germany, and the Czech Republic. About one-third of the area of the city was flooded. The smaller Widawa River also flooded the city simultaneously, worsening the damage. An earlier, equally devastating flood of the Oder river had taken place in 1903. A small part of the city was also flooded during the flood of 2010. From 2012 to 2015, the Wrocław water node was renovated and redeveloped to prevent further flooding.

Municipal Stadium in Wrocław, opened in 2011, hosted three matches in Group A of the UEFA Euro 2012 championship.

In 2016, Wrocław was declared the European Capital of Culture.

In 2017, Wrocław hosted the 2017 World Games.

Wrocław won the European Best Destination title in 2018.

Wrocław is now a unique European city of mixed heritage, with architecture influenced by Polish, Bohemian, Austrian, and Prussian traditions, such as Silesian Gothic and its Baroque style of court builders of Habsburg Austria (Fischer von Erlach). Wrocław has a number of notable buildings by German modernist architects including the famous Centennial Hall (1911–1913) designed by Max Berg.

== Geography ==
Wrocław is located in the three mesoregions of the Silesian Lowlands (Wrocław Plain, Wrocław Valley, Oleśnica Plain) at an elevation of around 105–156 metres (Gajowe Hill and Maślickie Hill) above sea level. The city lies on the Oder River and its four tributaries, which supply it within the city limits – Bystrzyca, Oława, Ślęza and Widawa. The Dobra River and many streams flow through the city. The city has a sewage treatment plant on the Janówek estate.

=== Flora and fauna ===
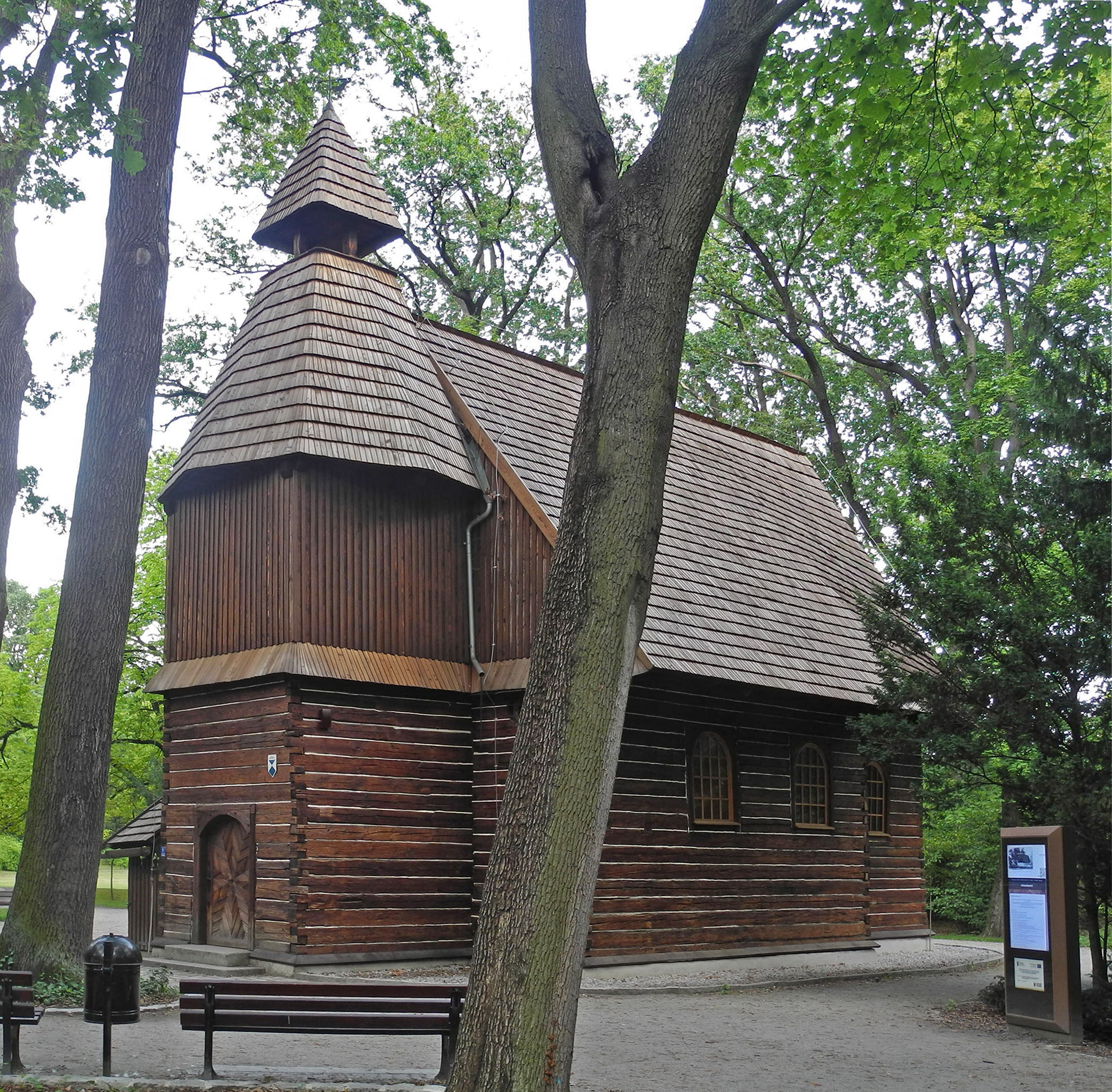
John of Nepomuk Church in Szczytnicki Park, 16th-century

There are 44 city parks and public green spaces covering around 800 hectares. The most notable are Szczytnicki Park, Park Południowy (South Park) and Anders Park. In addition, Wrocław University runs an historical botanical garden, founded in 1811, with a salient Alpine garden, a lake and a valley.

In Wrocław, the presence of over 200 species of birds has been registered, of which over 100 have nesting places there. As in other large Polish cities, the most numerous are pigeons. Other common species are the sparrow, tree sparrow, siskin, rook, hooded crow, jackdaw, magpie, swift, martin, swallow, kestrel, mute swan, mallard, coot, goosander, black-headed gull, great tit, blue tit, long-tailed tit, greenfinch, hawfinch, collared dove, wood pigeon, fieldfare, redwing, common starling, grey heron, white stork, common chaffinch, blackbird, jay, nuthatch, bullfinch, cuckoo, waxwing, lesser spotted woodpecker, great spotted woodpecker, middle spotted woodpecker, white wagtail, blackcap, black redstart, spotted flycatcher, collared flycatcher, goldfinch, marsh harrier, little bittern, common moorhen, reed bunting, penduline tit, great reed warbler, little crake, little ringed plover and white-tailed eagle.

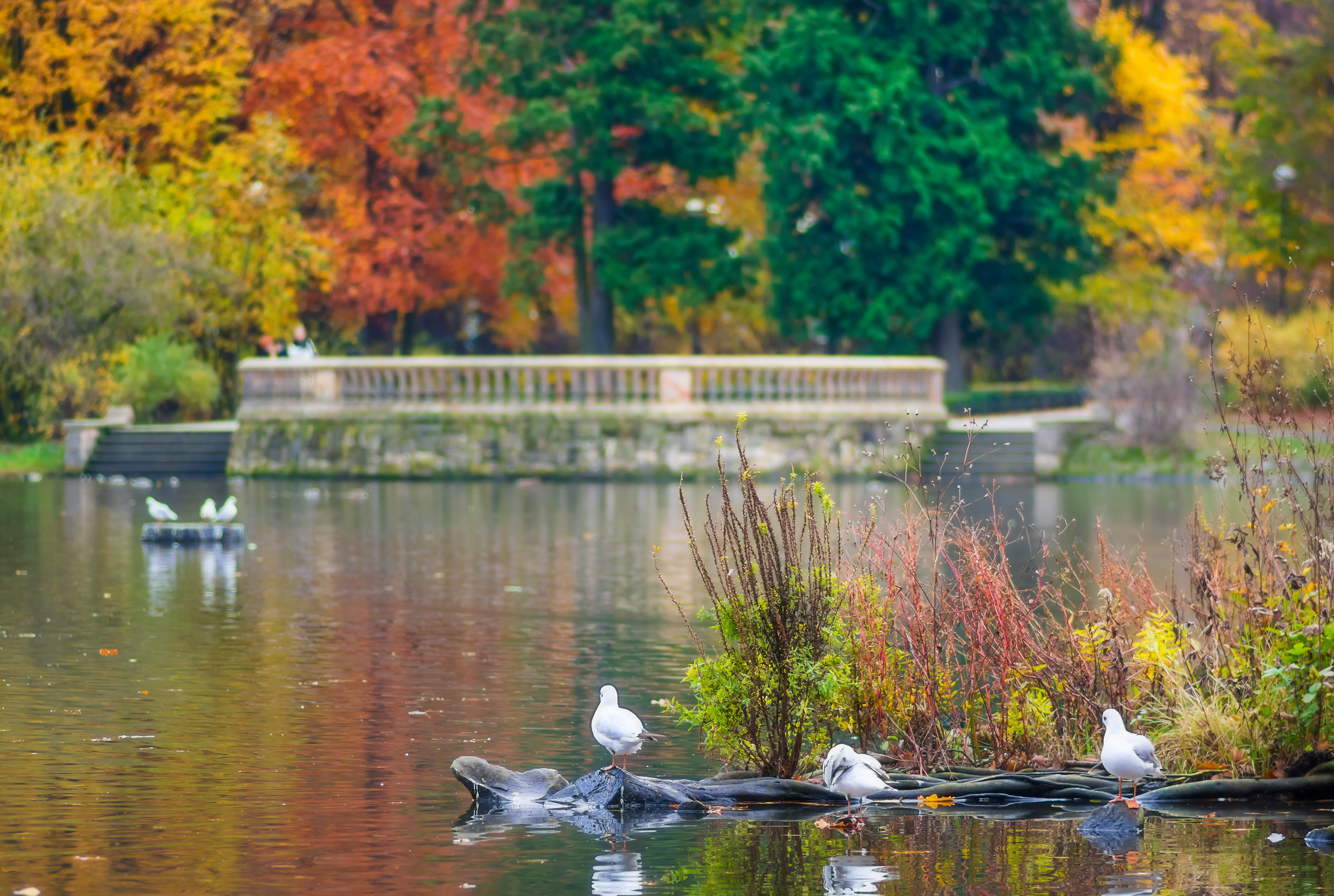
Wrocław South Park – Park Południowy

The city is famously periodically plagued by the brown rat, especially in the Market Square and in the vicinity of eateries. Otherwise, due to the proximity of wooded areas, there are hedgehogs, foxes, wild boar, bats, martens, squirrels, roe deer, hares, beavers, polecats, otters, badgers, weasels, stoats and raccoon dogs. There are also occasional sightings of escaped muskrat, american mink and raccoon.

=== Climate ===
Within the Köppen climate classification, Wrocław has an oceanic climate (Cfb), bordering on a humid continental climate (Dfb) using the 0 °C (32 °F) isotherm. The position of Wrocław in the Silesian Lowlands, which are located just north of the Sudetes and to the southwest of the Trzebnickie Hills, creates a favourable environment for accumulation of heat in the Oder river valley between Wrocław and Opole. Wrocław is therefore the warmest city in Poland, among those tracked by the Institute of Meteorology and Water Management (IMGW), with a mean annual temperature of 9.7 °C (49 °F).

The city experiences relatively mild and dry winters, but with the skies frequently overcast. Summers are warm and generally sunny, however, that is the period when most precipitation occurs, which often falls during thunderstorms. The city sometimes experiences foehn-like conditions, particularly when the wind blows from the south or the south-west. The temperatures in the city centre often tend to be higher than on the outskirts due to the urban heat island effect.

Snow may fall in any month from October to May but normally does so in winter. The snow cover of at least 1 cm (0.39 in) stays on the ground for an average of 27.5 days per year – one of the lowest in Poland. The highest temperature in Wrocław recognised by IMGW was noted on 8 August 2015 (37.9 °C (100 °F)), though thermometers at the meteorological station managed by the University of Wrocław indicated 38.9 °C (102 °F) on that day. The lowest temperature was recorded on 11 February 1956 (−32 °C (−26 °F)).

Climate data for Wrocław (Wrocław Airport), elevation: 120 m, 1991–2020 normals, extremes 1951–present
Month	Jan	Feb	Mar	Apr	May	Jun	Jul	Aug	Sep	Oct	Nov	Dec	Year
Record high °C (°F)	18.0 (64.4)	20.6 (69.1)	25.2 (77.4)	30.0 (86.0)	32.4 (90.3)	36.9 (98.4)	37.4 (99.3)	38.9 (102.0)	35.3 (95.5)	28.1 (82.6)	20.9 (69.6)	16.4 (61.5)	38.9 (102.0)
Mean maximum °C (°F)	10.8 (51.4)	12.7 (54.9)	18.2 (64.8)	24.3 (75.7)	27.8 (82.0)	31.5 (88.7)	32.8 (91.0)	32.5 (90.5)	27.6 (81.7)	22.8 (73.0)	16.2 (61.2)	11.4 (52.5)	34.3 (93.7)
Mean daily maximum °C (°F)	3.0 (37.4)	4.7 (40.5)	9.0 (48.2)	15.3 (59.5)	20.0 (68.0)	23.4 (74.1)	25.6 (78.1)	25.4 (77.7)	20.0 (68.0)	14.3 (57.7)	8.3 (46.9)	4.1 (39.4)	14.4 (57.9)
Daily mean °C (°F)	0.0 (32.0)	1.1 (34.0)	4.3 (39.7)	9.7 (49.5)	14.3 (57.7)	17.7 (63.9)	19.7 (67.5)	19.3 (66.7)	14.5 (58.1)	9.6 (49.3)	4.8 (40.6)	1.1 (34.0)	9.7 (49.5)
Mean daily minimum °C (°F)	−3.3 (26.1)	−2.5 (27.5)	0.0 (32.0)	3.8 (38.8)	8.3 (46.9)	12.0 (53.6)	13.9 (57.0)	13.4 (56.1)	9.4 (48.9)	5.2 (41.4)	1.3 (34.3)	−2.1 (28.2)	5.0 (41.0)
Mean minimum °C (°F)	−14.6 (5.7)	−11.4 (11.5)	−7.3 (18.9)	−3.5 (25.7)	1.9 (35.4)	6.0 (42.8)	8.7 (47.7)	7.0 (44.6)	2.4 (36.3)	−2.8 (27.0)	−6.4 (20.5)	−11.5 (11.3)	−16.8 (1.8)
Record low °C (°F)	−30.0 (−22.0)	−32.0 (−25.6)	−23.8 (−10.8)	−8.1 (17.4)	−4.0 (24.8)	0.2 (32.4)	3.6 (38.5)	2.1 (35.8)	−3.0 (26.6)	−9.3 (15.3)	−18.2 (−0.8)	−24.4 (−11.9)	−32.0 (−25.6)
Average precipitation mm (inches)	28.3 (1.11)	25.6 (1.01)	35.0 (1.38)	31.2 (1.23)	59.6 (2.35)	65.4 (2.57)	91.4 (3.60)	59.5 (2.34)	48.4 (1.91)	37.6 (1.48)	31.4 (1.24)	27.9 (1.10)	541.1 (21.30)
Average extreme snow depth cm (inches)	4.6 (1.8)	4.5 (1.8)	2.7 (1.1)	0.4 (0.2)	0.0 (0.0)	0.0 (0.0)	0.0 (0.0)	0.0 (0.0)	0.0 (0.0)	0.2 (0.1)	1.5 (0.6)	3.0 (1.2)	4.6 (1.8)
Average precipitation days (≥ 0.1 mm)	15.50	12.99	13.50	10.90	13.03	12.97	14.00	11.80	11.30	12.27	13.17	14.77	156.19
Average snowy days (≥ 0.0 cm)	12.4	9.1	4.0	0.5	0.0	0.0	0.0	0.0	0.0	0.1	2.4	6.4	34.9
Average relative humidity (%)	83.7	80.1	75.3	68.0	69.8	69.8	69.9	70.5	76.8	81.6	85.5	84.9	76.3
Mean monthly sunshine hours	58.8	82.2	129.2	202.6	245.5	247.6	257.4	250.8	170.1	118.5	66.9	52.8	1,882.5
Source 1: IMGW (normals, except humidity)
Source 2: Meteomodel.pl (humidity and extremes)

Climate data for Wrocław (Wrocław Airport), elevation: 120 m, 1961–1990 normals
Month	Jan	Feb	Mar	Apr	May	Jun	Jul	Aug	Sep	Oct	Nov	Dec	Year
Mean daily maximum °C (°F)	1.3 (34.3)	3.2 (37.8)	7.9 (46.2)	13.6 (56.5)	18.8 (65.8)	22.0 (71.6)	23.4 (74.1)	23.2 (73.8)	19.3 (66.7)	14.1 (57.4)	7.4 (45.3)	3.0 (37.4)	13.1 (55.6)
Daily mean °C (°F)	−1.8 (28.8)	−0.5 (31.1)	3.2 (37.8)	8.0 (46.4)	13.1 (55.6)	16.5 (61.7)	17.7 (63.9)	17.2 (63.0)	13.4 (56.1)	8.9 (48.0)	3.9 (39.0)	0.2 (32.4)	8.3 (47.0)
Mean daily minimum °C (°F)	−5.3 (22.5)	−4.0 (24.8)	−0.9 (30.4)	2.8 (37.0)	7.1 (44.8)	10.7 (51.3)	12.0 (53.6)	11.6 (52.9)	8.7 (47.7)	4.6 (40.3)	0.6 (33.1)	−3.1 (26.4)	3.7 (38.7)
Average precipitation mm (inches)	28 (1.1)	26 (1.0)	26 (1.0)	39 (1.5)	64 (2.5)	80 (3.1)	84 (3.3)	78 (3.1)	48 (1.9)	40 (1.6)	43 (1.7)	34 (1.3)	590 (23.1)
Average precipitation days (≥ 1.0 mm)	7.3	6.6	7.2	7.7	9.6	10.0	9.7	8.4	7.9	7.1	9.2	8.6	99.3
Mean monthly sunshine hours	49.0	65.0	107.0	142.0	198.0	194.0	205.0	197.0	139.0	108.0	52.0	39.0	1,495
Source: NOAA

== Government and politics ==
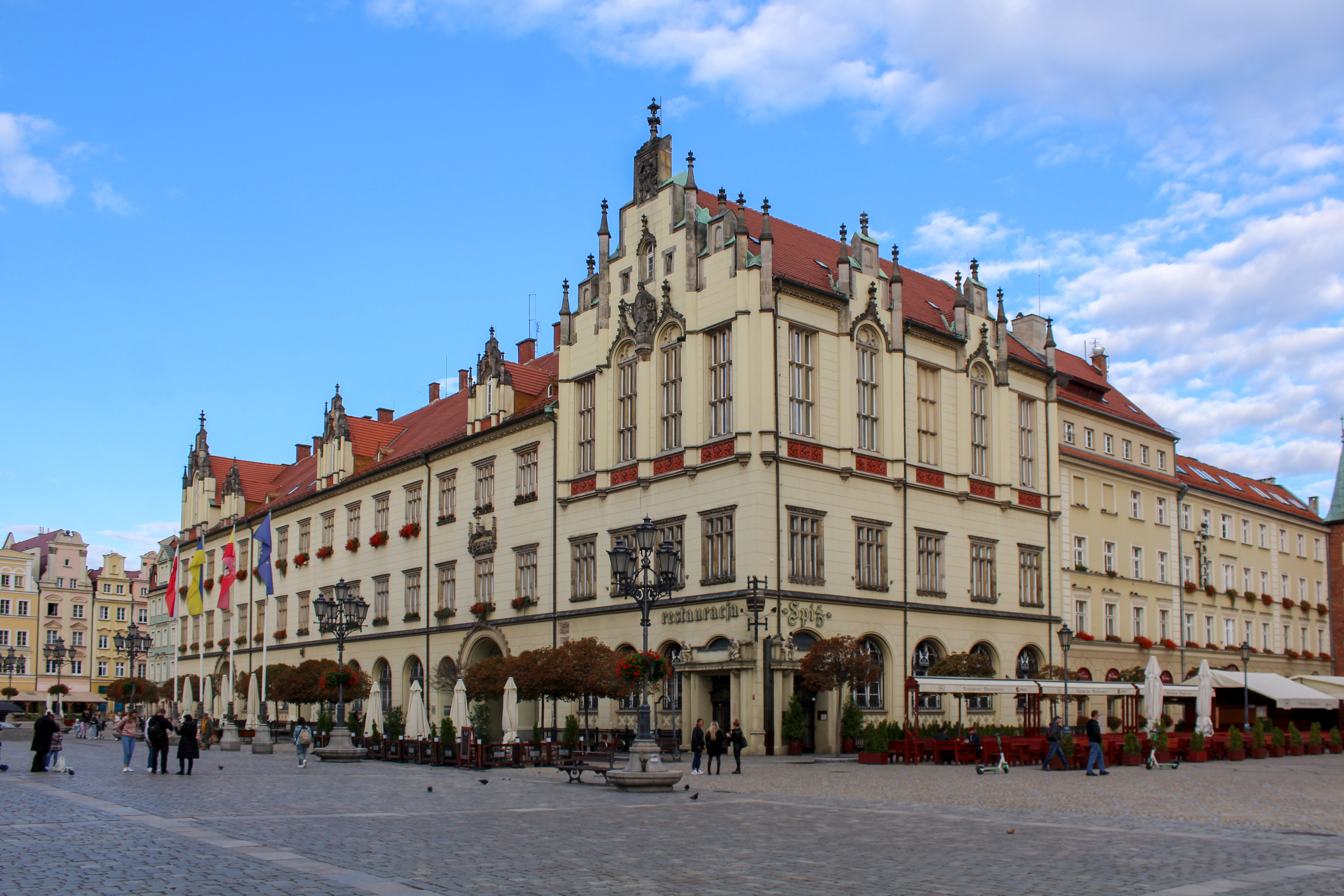
Wrocław New City Hall – the seat of the city mayor

Wrocław is the capital city of Lower Silesian Voivodeship, a province (voivodeship) created in 1999. It was previously the capital of Wrocław Voivodeship. The city is a separate urban gmina and city-county. It is also the seat of Wrocław County, which adjoins but does not include the city.

=== Districts ===
Wrocław was previously subdivided into five boroughs (Polish: dzielnice): Old Town, Downtown, Krzyki, Fabryczna, and Psie Pole. Although they were abolished in 1991 and have not existed as public administration units since then, areas of borders and names similar/identical to the former districts exist in the practice of operation of various types of authorities and administrations (e.g., as divisions of territorial competencies of courts, prosecutors' offices, tax offices, etc.).

The present Wrocław districts (Polish: osiedla) were created in 1991, and are a type of local government district.

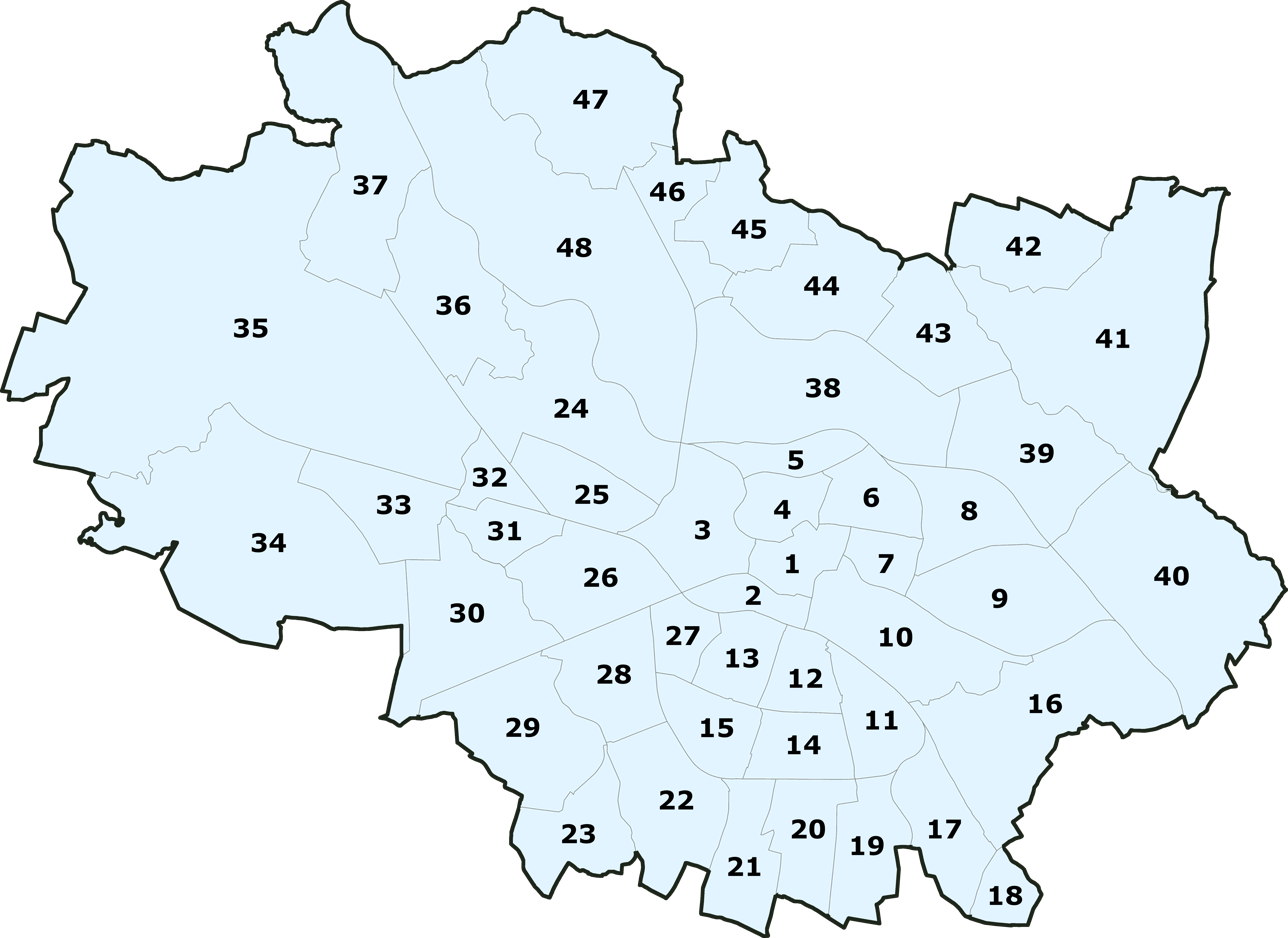
1. Old Town
2. Old Town
3. Przedmieście Świdnickie
4. Szczepin
5. Downtown
6. Nadodrze
7. Kleczków
8. Ołbin
9. Grunwald Square
10. Zacisze-Zalesie-Szczytniki
11. Biskupin-Sępolno-Dąbie-Bartoszowice
12. Krzyki
13. Przedmieście Oławskie
14. Tarnogaj
15. Huby
16. Powstańców Śląskich
17. Gaj
18. Borek
19. Księże
20. Brochów
21. Bieńkowice
22. Jagodno
23. Wojszyce
24. Ołtaszyn
25. Krzyki-Partynice
26. Klecina
24. Fabryczna
25. Pilczyce-Kozanów-Popowice Płn.
26. Gądów-Popowice Płd.
27. Muchobór Mały
28. Gajowice
29. Grabiszyn-Grabiszynek
30. Oporów
31. Muchobór Wielki
32. Nowy Dwór
33. Kuźniki
34. Żerniki
35. Jerzmanowo-Jarnołtów-Strachowice-Osiniec
36. Leśnica
37. Maślice
38. Pracze Odrzańskie
39. Psie Pole
40. Karłowice-Różanka
41. Kowale
42. Strachocin-Swojczyce-Wojnów
43. Psie Pole-Zawidawie
44. Pawłowice
45. Sołtysowice
46. Polanowice-Poświętne-Ligota
47. Widawa
48. Lipa Piotrowska
49. Świniary
50. Osobowice-Rędzin

=== Municipal government ===
Wrocław is governed by the city's mayor and a municipal legislature known as the city council. The city council is made up of 39 councilors and is directly elected by the city's inhabitants. The remit of the council and president extends to all areas of municipal policy and development planning, up to and including development of local infrastructure, transport and planning permission. It is not able to draw taxation directly from its citizens, and instead receives its budget from the Polish national government, whose seat is in Warsaw.

The city's current mayor is Jacek Sutryk, who has served in this position since 2018. The first mayor of Wrocław after the war was Bolesław Drobner, appointed to the position on 14 March 1945, even before the surrender of Festung Breslau.

== Economy ==
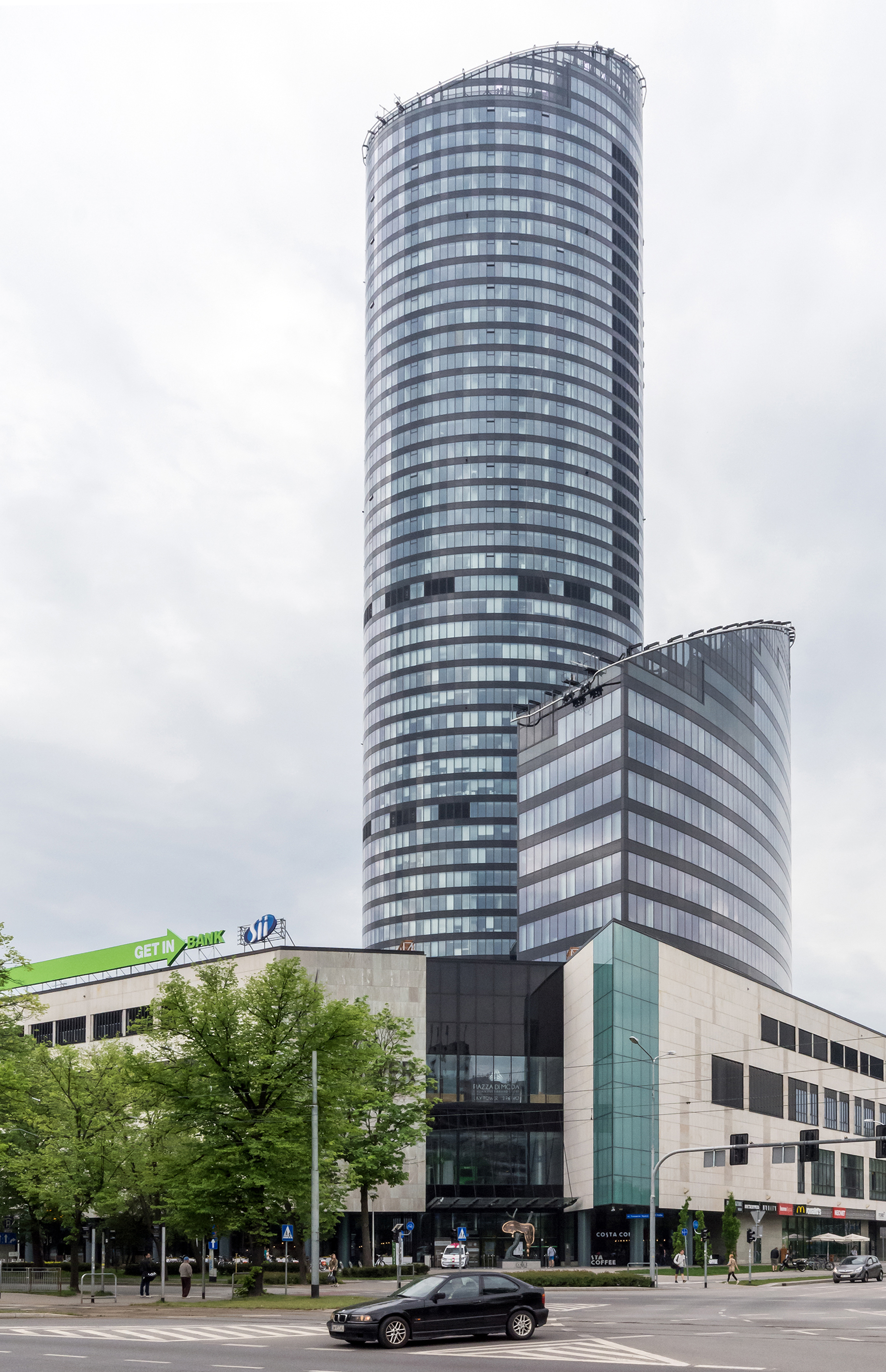
Sky Tower is one of the tallest buildings in Poland. It has office, commercial, residential and recreational space.

Wrocław is the second-wealthiest of the large cities in Poland after Warsaw. The city is home to the largest number of leasing and debt collection companies in the country, including the largest European Leasing Fund as well as numerous banks. Due to the proximity of the borders with Germany and the Czech Republic, Wrocław and the region of Lower Silesia is a large import and export partner with these countries.

Wrocław is one of the most innovative cities in Poland with the largest number of R&D centres in the country, due to the co-operation between the municipality, business sector and numerous universities. There are many organisations dealing with innovation; research institutions and technology transfer offices, incubators, technology and business parks, business support organisations, companies, start-ups and co-working spaces. The infrastructure available in Wrocław facilitates the creation of innovative products and services and enables conducting research projects.

Wrocław's industry manufactures buses, railroad cars, home appliances, chemicals, and electronics. The city houses factories and development centres of many foreign and domestic corporations, such as WAGO Kontakttechnik, Siemens, Bosch, Whirlpool Corporation, Nokia Networks, Volvo, HP, IBM, Google, Opera Software, Bombardier Transportation, WABCO and others. Wrocław is the location of offices for large Polish companies including Getin Holding, AmRest, Polmos, and MCI Management SA. Kaufland Poland has its main headquarters in the city.

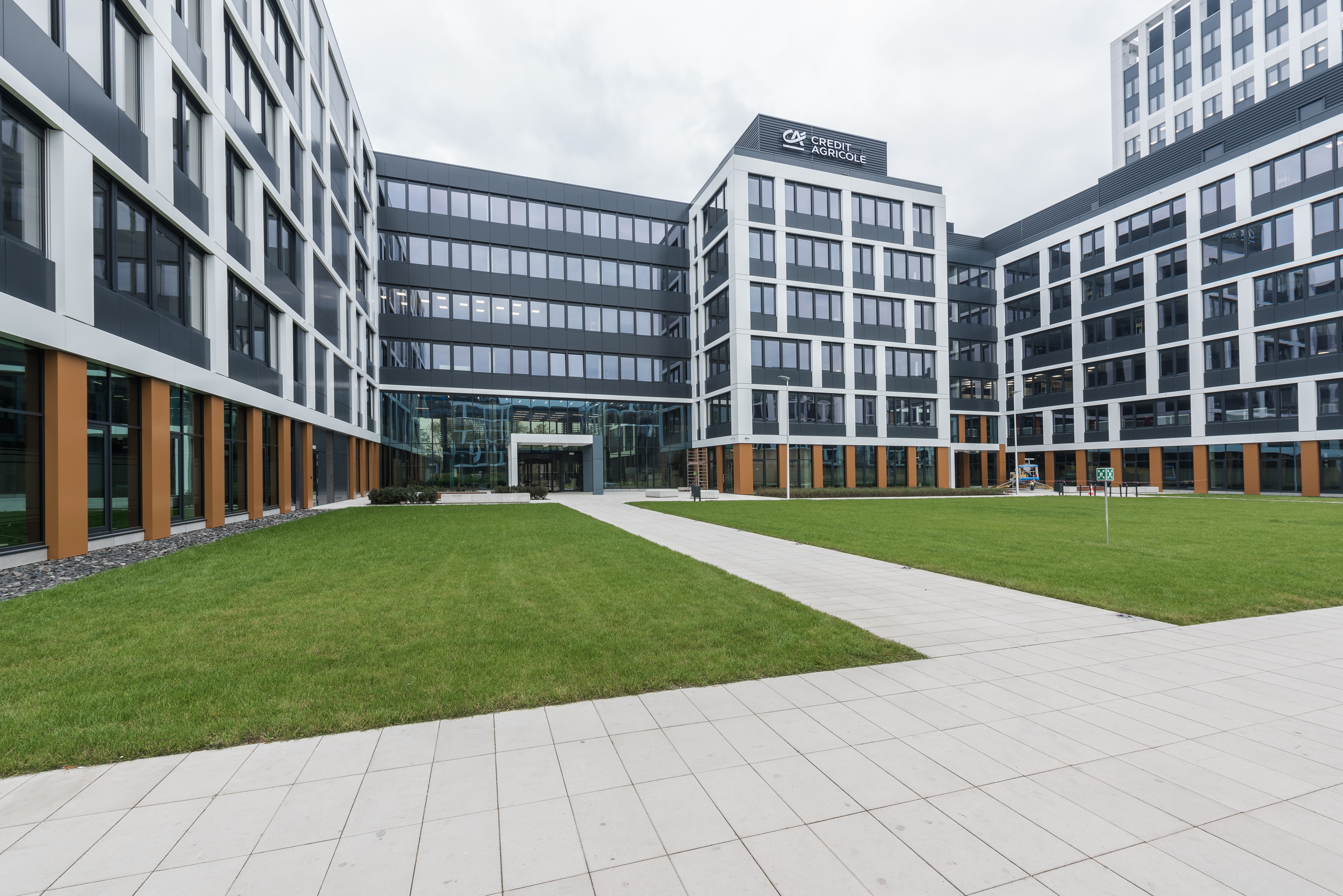
The Crédit Agricole Poland headquarters in Wrocław

Since the beginning of the 21st century, the city has had a developing high-tech sector. Many high-tech companies are located in the Wrocław Technology Park, such as Baluff, CIT Engineering, Caisson Elektronik, ContiTech, Ericsson, Innovative Software Technologies, IBM, IT-MED, IT Sector, LiveChat Software, Mitsubishi Electric, Maas, PGS Software, Technology Transfer Agency Techtra and Vratis. In Biskupice Podgórne (Community Kobierzyce) there are factories of LG (LG Display, LG Electronics, LG Chem, LG Innotek), Dong Seo Display, Dong Yang Electronics, Toshiba, and many other companies, mainly from the electronics and home appliances sectors, while the Nowa Wieś Wrocławska factory and distribution centre of Nestlé Purina and factories a few other enterprises.

The city is the seat of Wrocław Research Centre EIT+, which contains, inter alia, geological research laboratories to the unconventional and Lower Silesian Cluster of Nanotechnology. The logistics centres DHL, FedEx and UPS are based in Wrocław. It is a major centre for the pharmaceutical industry (U.S. Pharmacia, Hasco-Lek, Galena, Avec Pharma, 3M, Labor, S-Lab, Herbapol, and Cezal).

Wrocław is home to Poland's largest shopping mall – Bielany Avenue (pl. Aleja Bielany) and Bielany Trade Centre, located in Bielany Wrocławskie where stores such as Auchan, Decathlon, Leroy Merlin, Makro, IKEA, Jula, OBI, Castorama, Black Red White, Poco, E. Wedel, Cargill, Prologis and Panattoni can be found.

Ten Square Games was founded in 2011 by Maciej Popowicz and Arkadiusz Pernal. The company's name comes from the ten-square-metre office space where it began in Wrocław. It is still headquartered in the city until this day, while its stock is listed on Warsaw Stock Exchange.

In February 2013, Qatar Airways launched its Wrocław European Customer Service.

=== Major corporations ===
- 3M
- Aira
- Akwawit–Polmos S.A. – Wratislavia vodka plant
- The Bank of New York Mellon
- Bombardier Transportation Poland
- BSH – Bosch und Siemens Hausgeräte
- CD Projekt
- CH Robinson Worldwide
- Crédit Agricole Poland
- Credit Suisse
- Deichmann
- DeLaval Operations Poland
- DHL
- Dolby Labs
- Ernst & Young
- Fantasy Expo – owner CD-Action
- Gigaset Communications
- Google
- Hewlett-Packard
- IBM
- Kaufland Poland
- KGHM Polska Miedź
- LG Electronics
- McKinsey & Company
- Microsoft
- National Bank of Poland
- Nokia Networks
- Olympus Business Services Europe
- Opera Software
- Parker Hannifin
- PZ Cussons Poland
- PZU
- QAD
- Qatar Airways
- Qiagen
- Robert Bosch GmbH
- SAP Poland
- Santander Consumer Bank
- Siemens
- Südzucker
- Techland
- Text
- Tieto
- UBS
- UPS
- United Technologies Corporation
- Viessmann
- Vulcan
- WABCO Poland
- Whirlpool Poland

=== Shopping centres ===
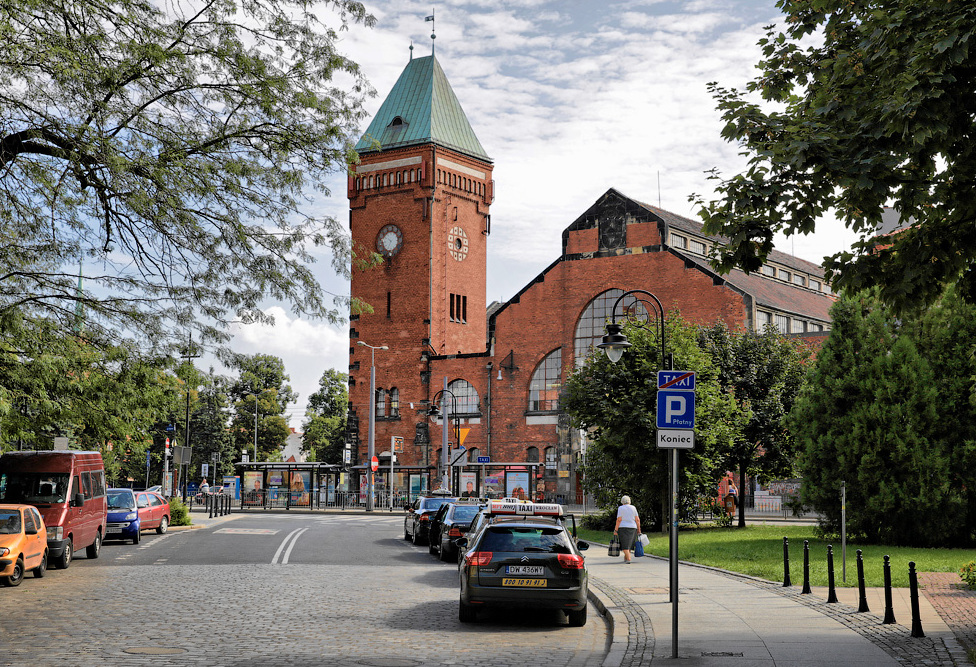
Wrocław Market Hall

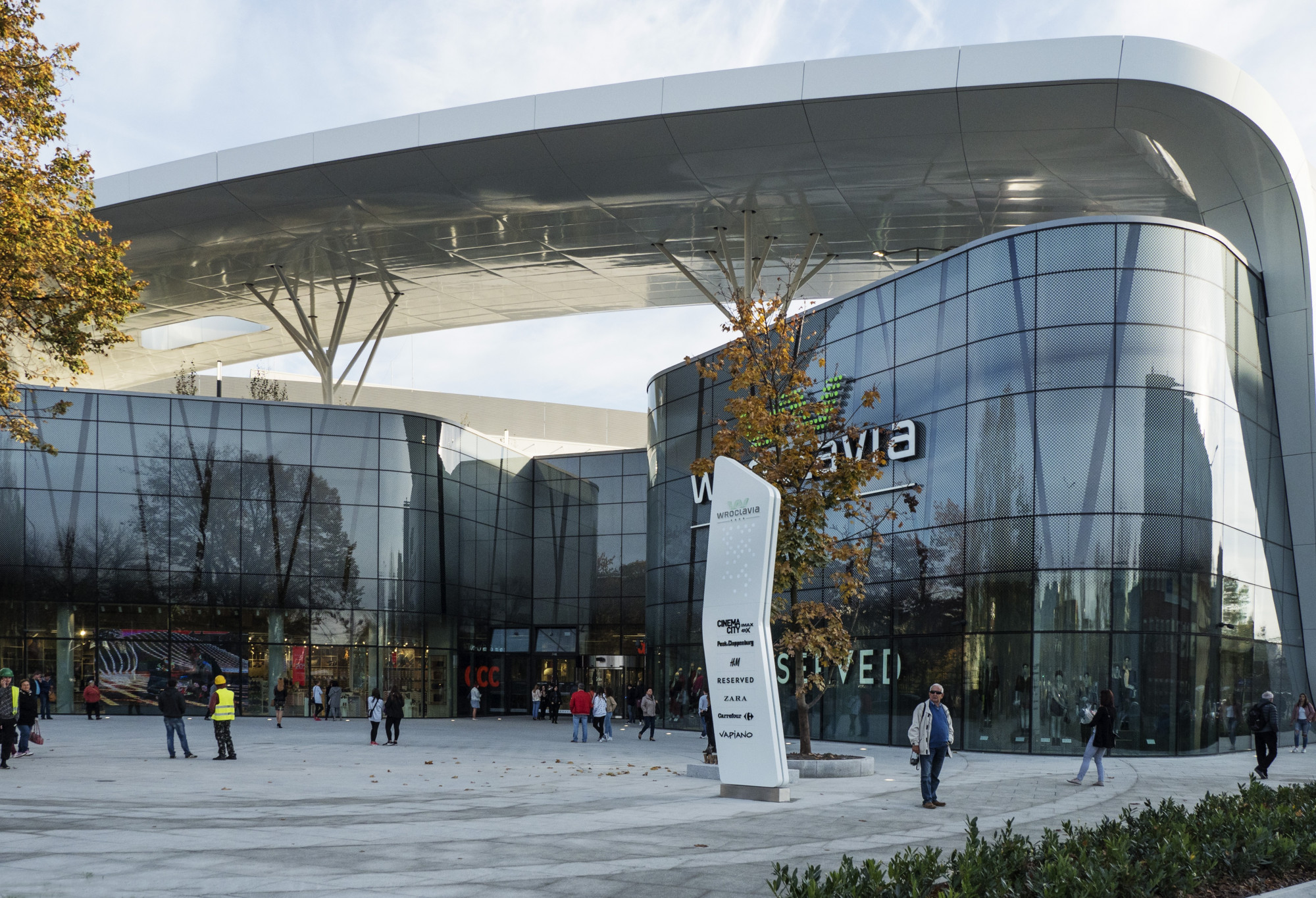
Wroclavia Shopping Mall

- Magnolia Park - The fourth largest shopping centre in Poland and the largest one in Wrocław. It offers a wide selection of shops, including Zara, Sephora, Cropp, Castorama, and Primark
- Wroclavia - One of the largest malls in Poland and the 2nd largest in Wrocław, after Magnolia Park. It is a major shopping centre, located next to the Wrocław Main railway station, featuring more than 150 shopping outlets, restaurants, cafes and Cinema City. The building also houses Wrocław Central coach station, which is located beneath the shopping centre
- Arkady Wrocławskie – A shopping and office complex opened in 2007. Most of its remaining retail and leisure tenants closed on 30 April 2024, ahead of the building's redevelopment and demolition.
- Galeria Dominikańska
- Pasaż Grunwaldzki
- Centrum Handlowe Korona - Large shopping complex located in north Wrocław. It features retail shops for fashion and home goods, as well as a food court & cinema
- Marino
- Centrum Handlowe Borek
- Galeria Handlowa Sky Tower
- Wrocław Fashion Outlet
- Factoria Park
- Renoma, a luxury department and a building of significant architectural value, representing the modernist style.
- Wrocław Market Hall
- Feniks

== Transport ==
A map of Wrocław, illustrating the A8 bypass and surrounding arterial roads

Wrocław is a major transport hub, situated at the crossroad of many routes linking Western and Central Europe with the rest of Poland. The city is skirted on the south by the A4 highway, which is part of the European route E40, extending from the Polish-German to the Polish-Ukrainian border across southern Poland. The 672-kilometre highway beginning at Jędrzychowice connects Lower Silesia with Opole and the industrial Upper Silesian metropolis, Kraków, Tarnów and Rzeszów. It also provides easy access to German cities such as Dresden, Leipzig, Magdeburg and with the A18 highway Berlin, Hamburg.

The toll-free A8 bypass (Wrocław ring road) around the west and north of the city connects the A4 highway with three major routes – S5 expressway leading to Poznań, Bydgoszcz; the S8 express road towards Oleśnica, Łódź, Warsaw, Białystok; and the National Road 8 to Prague, Brno and other townships in the Czech Republic.

Traffic congestion is a significant issue in Wrocław as in most Polish cities. In 2026 it was ranked as the second-most congested city in Poland, with an average of 138 hours spent in gridlock every year. On average, a car driver in Wrocław annually spends seven days and two hours in a traffic jam. Roadblocks, gridlocks and narrow cobblestone streets around the Old Town are considered obstacles by drivers. The lack of parking space is also a major setback; private lots or on-street pay bays are the most common means of parking. A 2019 study revealed that there are approximately 130 vehicles per each parking spot, and the search for an unoccupied bay takes on average eight minutes.

=== Aviation ===
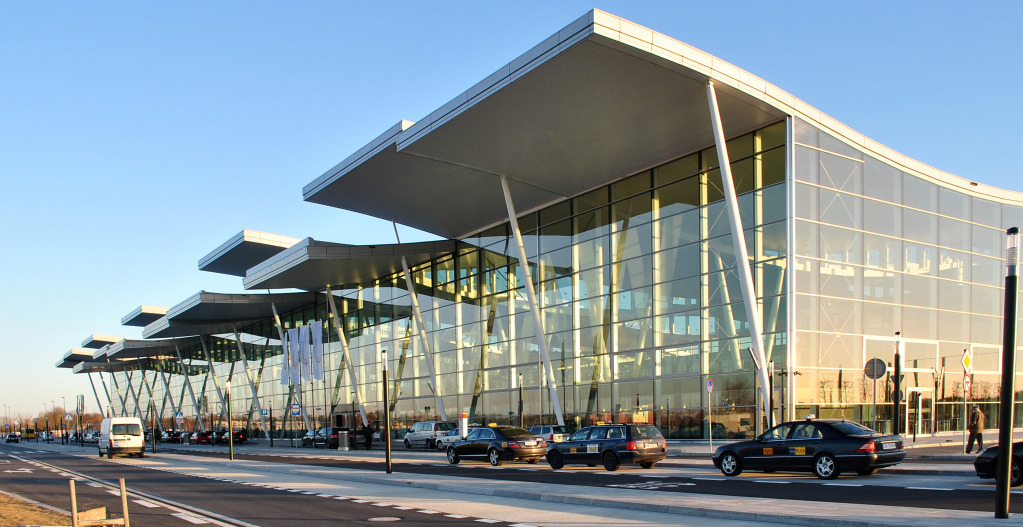
Wrocław Airport in Strachowice

The city is served by Wrocław Airport (IATA: WRO ICAO: EPWR) situated around 10 kilometres southwest from the city centre. The airport handles passenger flights with LOT Polish Airlines, Buzz, Ryanair, Wizz Air, Lufthansa, Eurowings, Air France, KLM, Scandinavian Airlines, Swiss International Air Lines and air cargo connections. In 2019, over a 3.5 million passengers passed through the airport, placing it fifth on the list of busiest airports in Poland.

Among the permanent and traditional destinations are Warsaw, Amsterdam, Düsseldorf, Frankfurt am Main, Zürich and Budapest. Low-cost flights are common among British, Italian, Spanish and Ukrainian travellers, based on the number of destinations. Seasonal charter flights are primarily targeted at Polish holidaymakers travelling to Southern Europe and North Africa.

=== Rail and bus ===
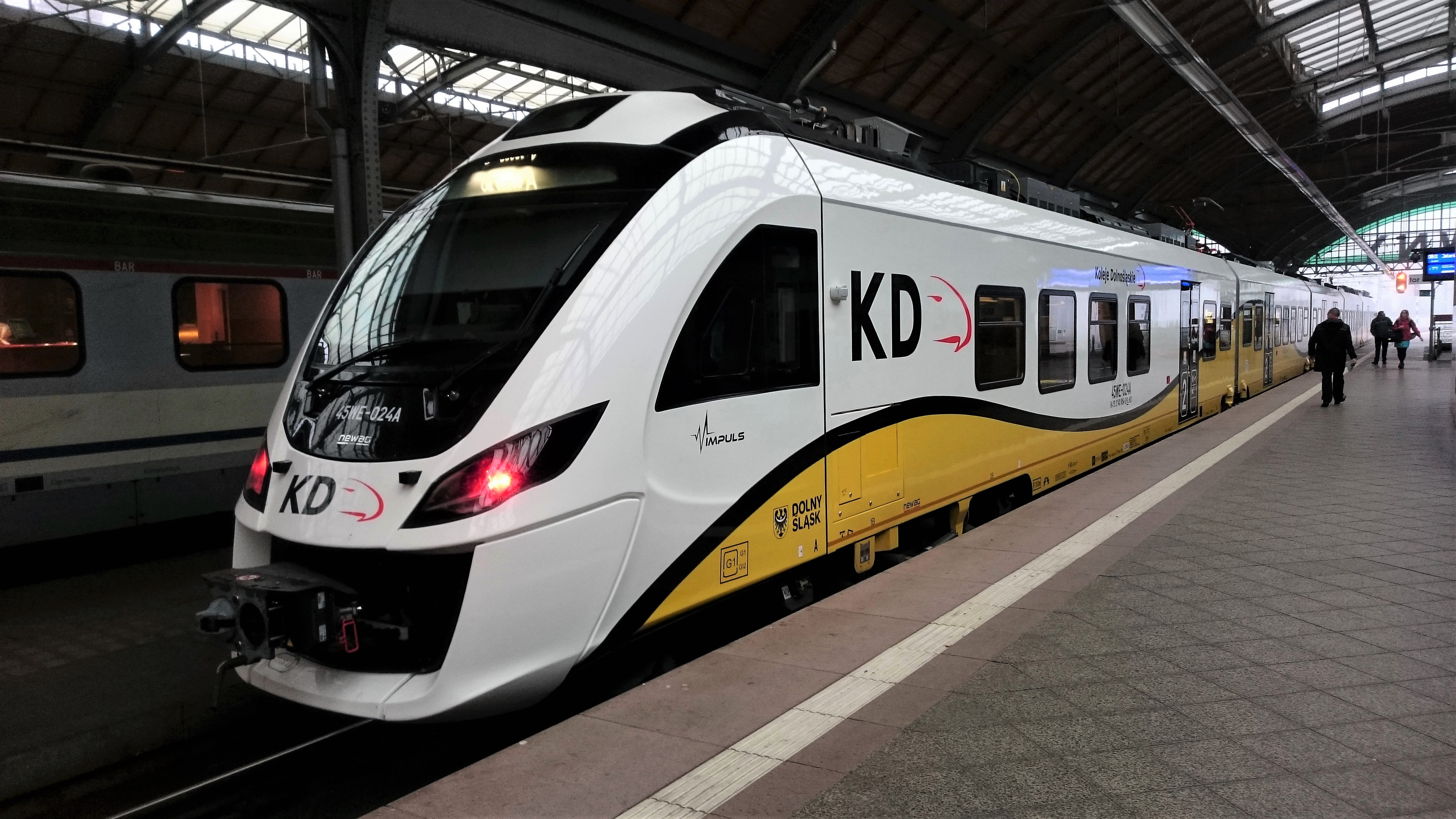
A Lower Silesian Railways train at Wrocław Główny railway station

The main rail station is Wrocław Główny, which is the largest railway station in Poland by the number of passengers served (21.2 million passengers a year), and perhaps the most important railroad junction alongside Warsaw Central station. The station is supported by PKP Intercity, Polregio, Lower Silesian Railways and Leo Express. There are direct connections to Szczecin, Poznań, and to Warsaw Central through Łódź Fabryczna railway station. There is also a regular connection to Berlin Hauptbahnhof and Wien Hauptbahnhof (Vienna), as well as a direct link to Praha hlavní nádraží (Prague).

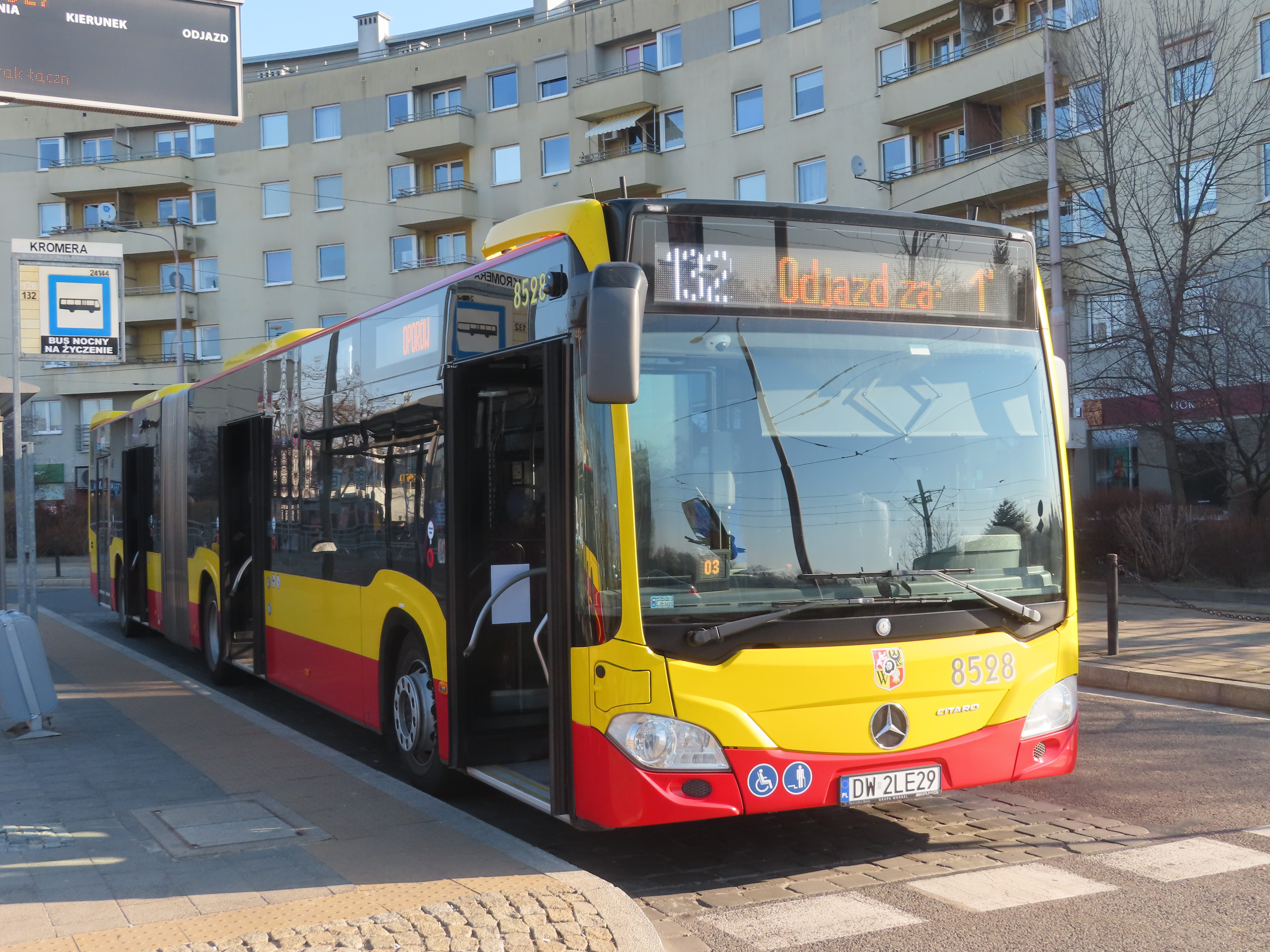
Bus transport in Wrocław

Adjacent to the railway station, is a central bus station located in the basement of the shopping mall Wroclavia, with services offered by PKS, Neobus, Flixbus, Sindbad, and others.

=== Public transport ===
The public transport in Wrocław comprises 99 bus lines and a well-developed network of 25 tram lines, with a length of over 200 kilometres, operated by the Municipal Transport Company MPK (Miejskie Przedsiębiorstwo Komunikacyjne). Rides are paid for, tickets can be purchased in vending machines, which are located at bus stops, as well as in the vending machines located in the vehicle. Payment is via contactless payment card, and the ticket is saved on the card. The tickets are available for purchase in the electronic form via mobile app: mPay, Apple Pay, SkyCash, Mobill, Google Pay. Tickets are one-ride or temporary (0.25, 0.5, 1, 1.5, 24, 48, 72, or 168 hours).

All buses and a significant portion of the trams have low-floors.

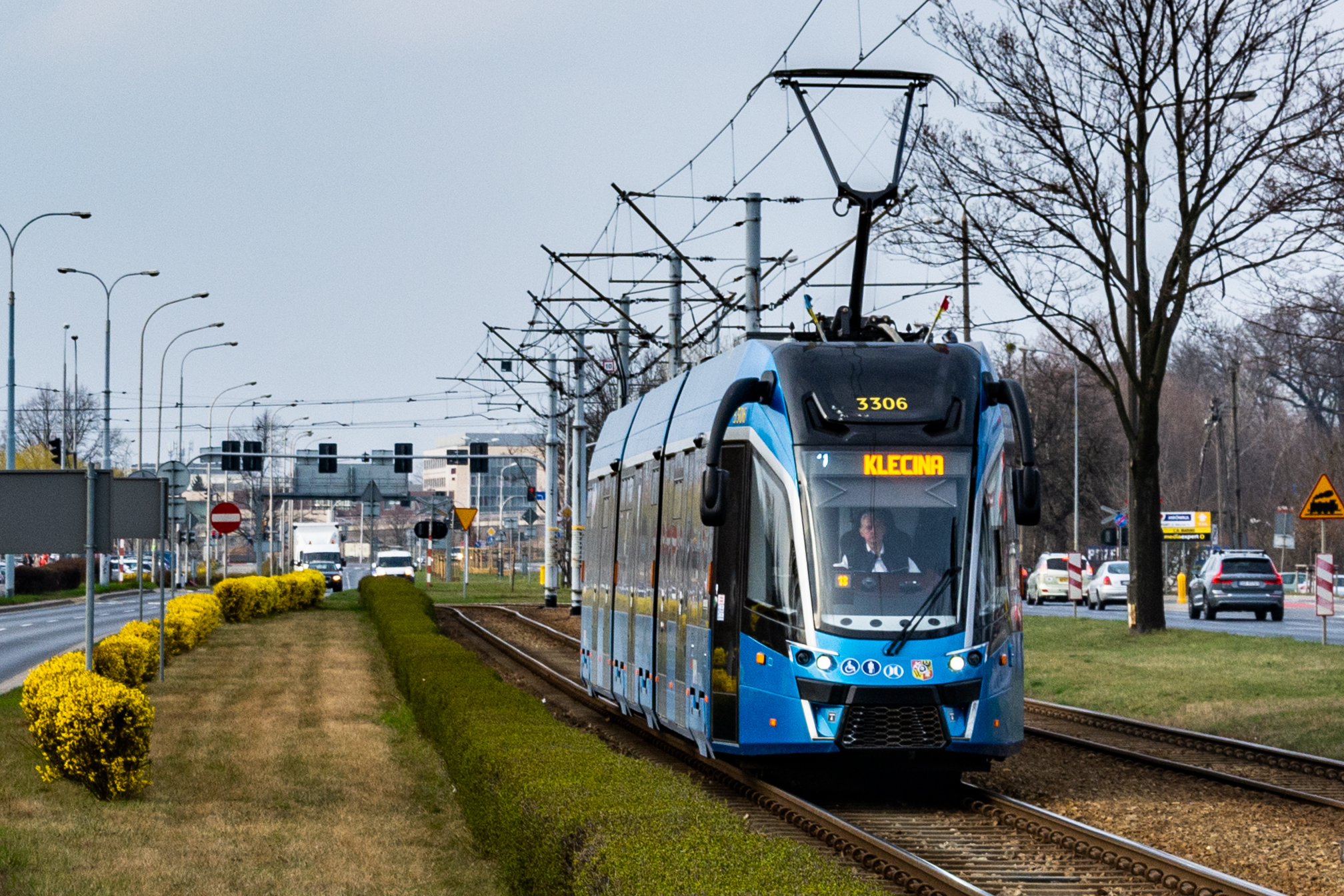
Moderus Gamma LF07AC tram

Over a dozen traditional taxicab firms operate in the city as well as online ridesharing services Uber, iTaxi, Bolt and Free Now.

=== Other ===
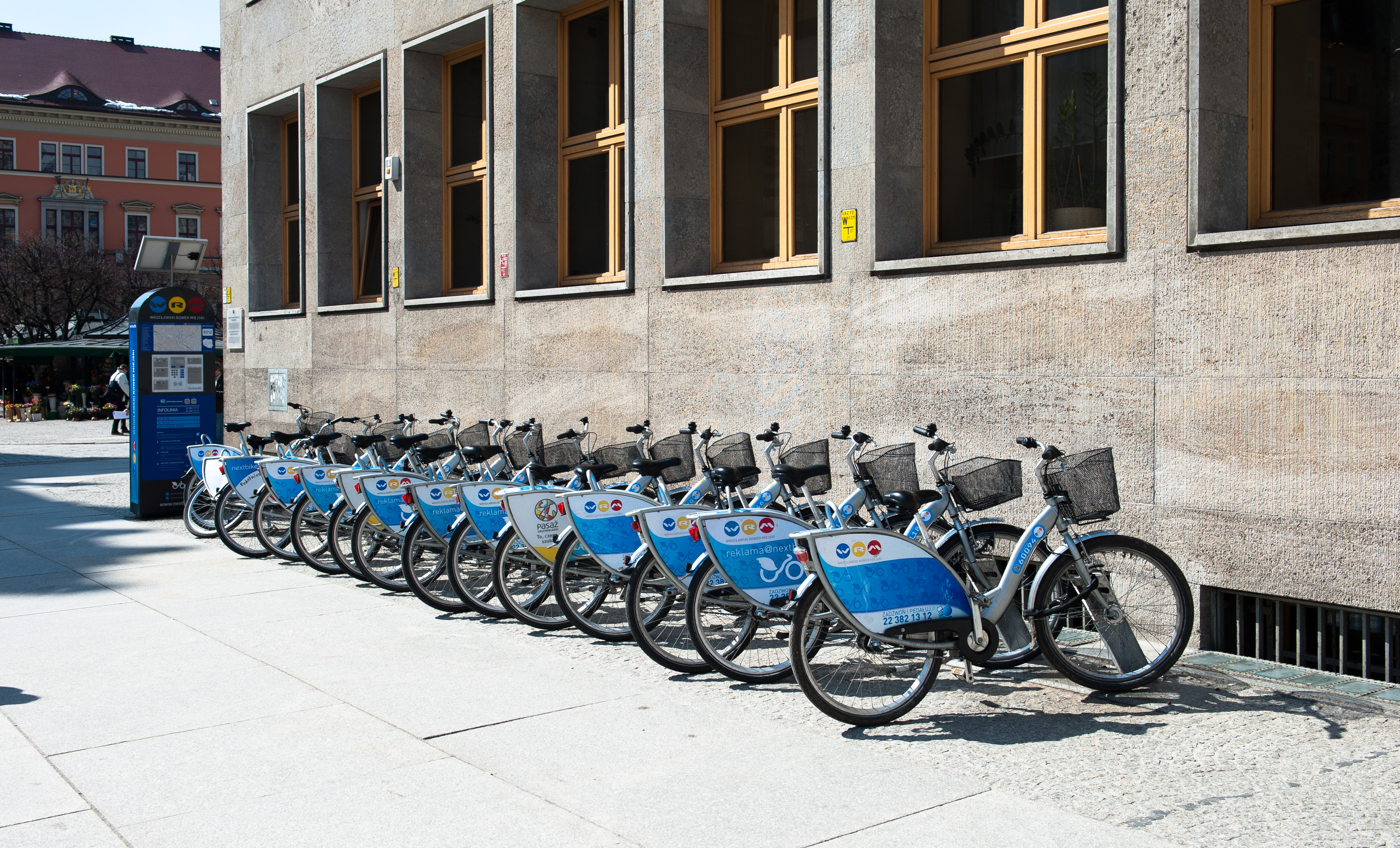
Wrocław City Bike

There are 1,200 km (746 mi) of cycling paths, including about 100 km (62 mi) paths on flood embankments. Wrocław has a bike rental network called the City Bike (Wrocławski Rower Miejski). It has 2,000 bicycles and 200 self-service stations. In addition to regular bicycles, tandem, cargo, electric, folding, tricycles, children's, and handbikes are available, operating every year from 1 March to 30 November. During winter (December – February) 200 bikes are available in the system.

Wrocław possesses a scooter-sharing system of Lime, Bird, Bolt and Hive Free Now – e-scooter rental is available using a mobile application.

Electronic car rental systems include Traficar, Panek CarSharing (hybrid cars), GoScooter and hop.city electric scooters using the mobile application.

A gondola lift over the Oder called Polinka began operation in 2013. Wrocław also has a river port on the Oder and several marinas.

== Demographics ==
Wrocław population pyramid in 2021

In December 2020, the estimated population of Wrocław was 641,928, of which 342,215 were women and 299,713 were men. Since 2011, the population has been steadily rising, with a 0.142% increase between 2019 and 2020, and a 2.167% increase in the years 2011–2020. In 2018, the crude birth rate stood at 11.8 and the mortality rate at 11.1 per 1,000 residents. The median age in 2018 was 43 years. The city's population is aging significantly; between 2013 and 2018, the number of seniors, per Statistics Poland – men aged 65 or above and women aged 60 or above, surged from 21.5% to 24.2%.

Historically, the city's population grew rapidly throughout the 19th and 20th centuries. In 1900, approximately 422,709 people were registered as residents. In 1910 the population was 512,105 of whom according to the official census 3.62% (18,538) spoke Polish, however some Polish scholars estimated that there could be even up to 50,000 (10%) people of Polish extraction in Breslau. In 1933, the population was 625,000. Between 1933 and 1939 the population declined to 620,976 on 17 May 1939. The strongest growth was recorded from 1900 to 1910, with almost 100,000 new residents within the city limits. Although the city was overwhelmingly German-speaking, the ethnic composition based on heritage or place of birth was mixed.

Around 43% of all inhabitants in 1910 were born outside Silesia and migrated into the city, mostly from the contemporary regions of Greater Poland (then the Prussian Partition of Poland) or Pomerania. Poles and Jews were among the most prominent active minorities. Simultaneously, the city's territorial expansion and incorporation of surrounding townships further strengthened population growth.

Following the end of the Second World War and post-1945 expulsions of the remaining pre-war population, Wrocław became again predominantly Polish-speaking. New incomers were primarily resettled from areas in the east which Poland lost (Vilnius and Lviv), or from other provinces, notably the regions of Greater Poland, Lublin, Białystok and Rzeszów. At the end of 1947, the city's population was estimated at 224,800 individuals. In the following years, Wrocław had the largest rate of natural increase among the five largest Polish cities. German nationals who stayed were either resettled in the late 1940s and 1950s, or assimilated, though a cultural society now exists to promote German culture in the still-existing German minority. In the 1950s, Greeks, refugees of the Greek Civil War, also settled in the city.

Wrocław currently has one of the highest concentration of foreigners in Poland alongside Warsaw and Poznań. A significant majority are migrant workers from Ukraine; other significant minorities include people from Italy, Spain, South Korea, India, Russia and Turkey. No exact statistic exists on the number of temporary residents from abroad. The city is home to a large population of foreign students.

=== Religion ===
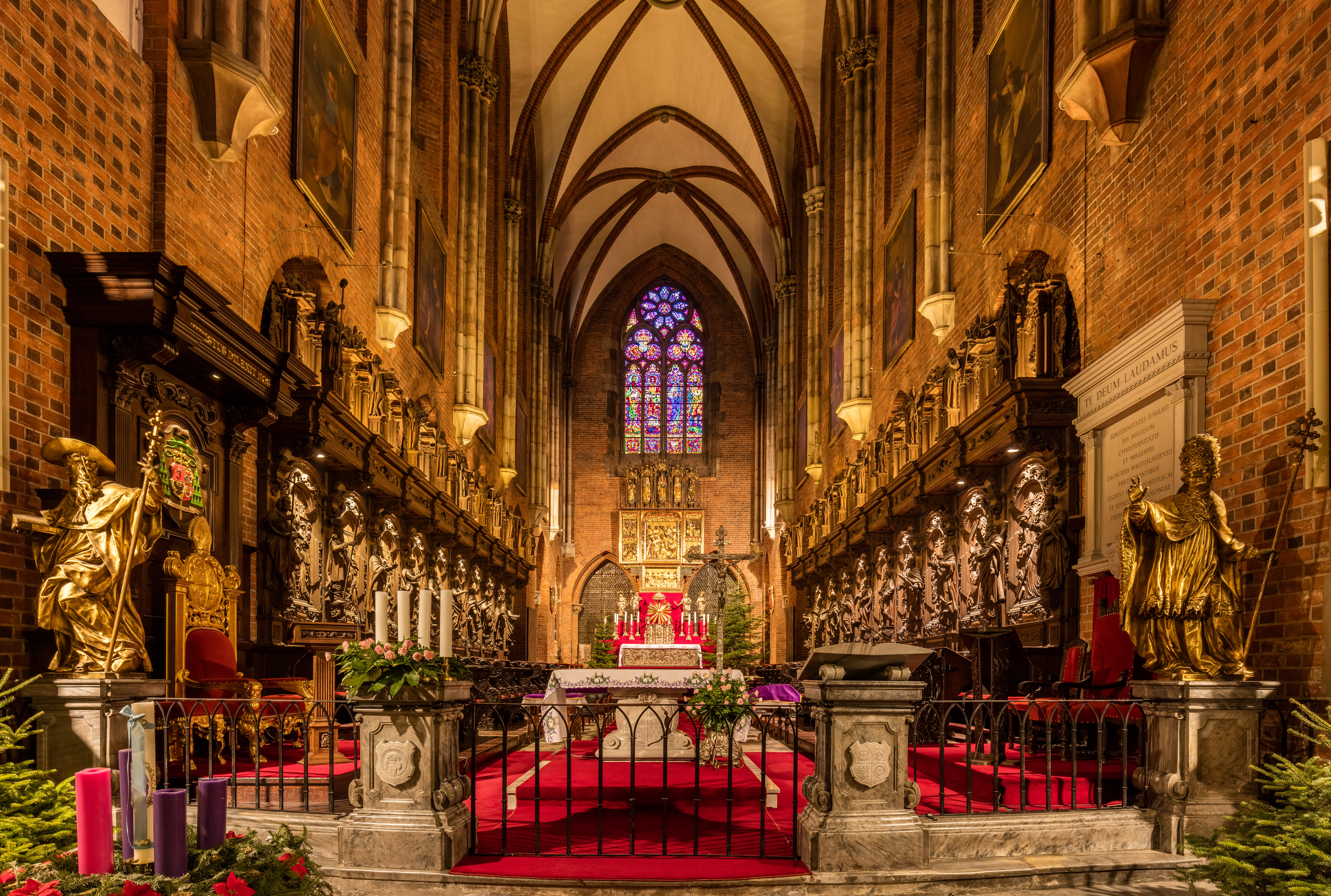
Wrocław Cathedral, which dates back to the 13th century

Wrocław's population is predominantly Roman Catholic, like the rest of Poland. The diocese was founded in the city in 1000. It was one of the first dioceses in the country at that time. Now the city is the seat of a Catholic Archdiocese.

Prior to World War II, Breslau was mostly inhabited by Protestants, followed by a large Roman Catholic and a significant Jewish minority. In 1939, of 620,976 inhabitants, 368,464 were Protestants (United Protestants; mostly Lutherans and minority Reformed; in the Evangelical Church of the old-Prussian Union), 193,805 Catholics, 2,135 other Christians and 10,659 Jews. Wrocław had the third largest Jewish population of all cities in Germany before the war. Its White Stork Synagogue was completed in 1840, and rededicated in 2010. In 2014, it celebrated its first ordination of four rabbis and three cantors since the Holocaust. The Polish authorities together with the German Foreign Minister attended the official ceremony.

The White Stork Synagogue, initially opened in 1829

Post-war resettlements from Poland's ethnically and religiously more diverse former eastern territories, known in Polish as Kresy, and the eastern parts of post-1945 Poland (see Operation Vistula) account for a comparatively large portion of Greek Catholics and Orthodox Christians of mostly Ukrainian and Lemko descent. Wrocław is also unique for its "Dzielnica Czterech Świątyń" (Borough of Four Temples)—a part of Stare Miasto (Old Town) where a synagogue, a Lutheran church, a Roman Catholic church and an Eastern Orthodox church stand near each other.

Other Christian denominations present in Wrocław include Seventh Day Adventists, Baptists, Free Christians, Reformed (Calvinist), Methodists, Pentecostals, Jehovah's Witnesses and members of the Church of Jesus Christ of Latter-Day Saints. Non-Christian congregations include Buddhists. There are also minor associations practicing and promoting Rodnovery neopaganism.

In 2007, the Roman Catholic Archbishop of Wrocław established the Pastoral Centre for English Speakers, which offers Mass on Sundays and Holy Days of Obligation, as well as other sacraments, fellowship, retreats, catechesis and pastoral care for all English-speaking Catholics and non-Catholics interested in the Catholic Church. The Pastoral Centre is under the care of Order of Friars Minor, Conventual (Franciscans) of the Kraków Province in the parish of St Charles Borromeo (Św Karol Boromeusz).

== Education ==
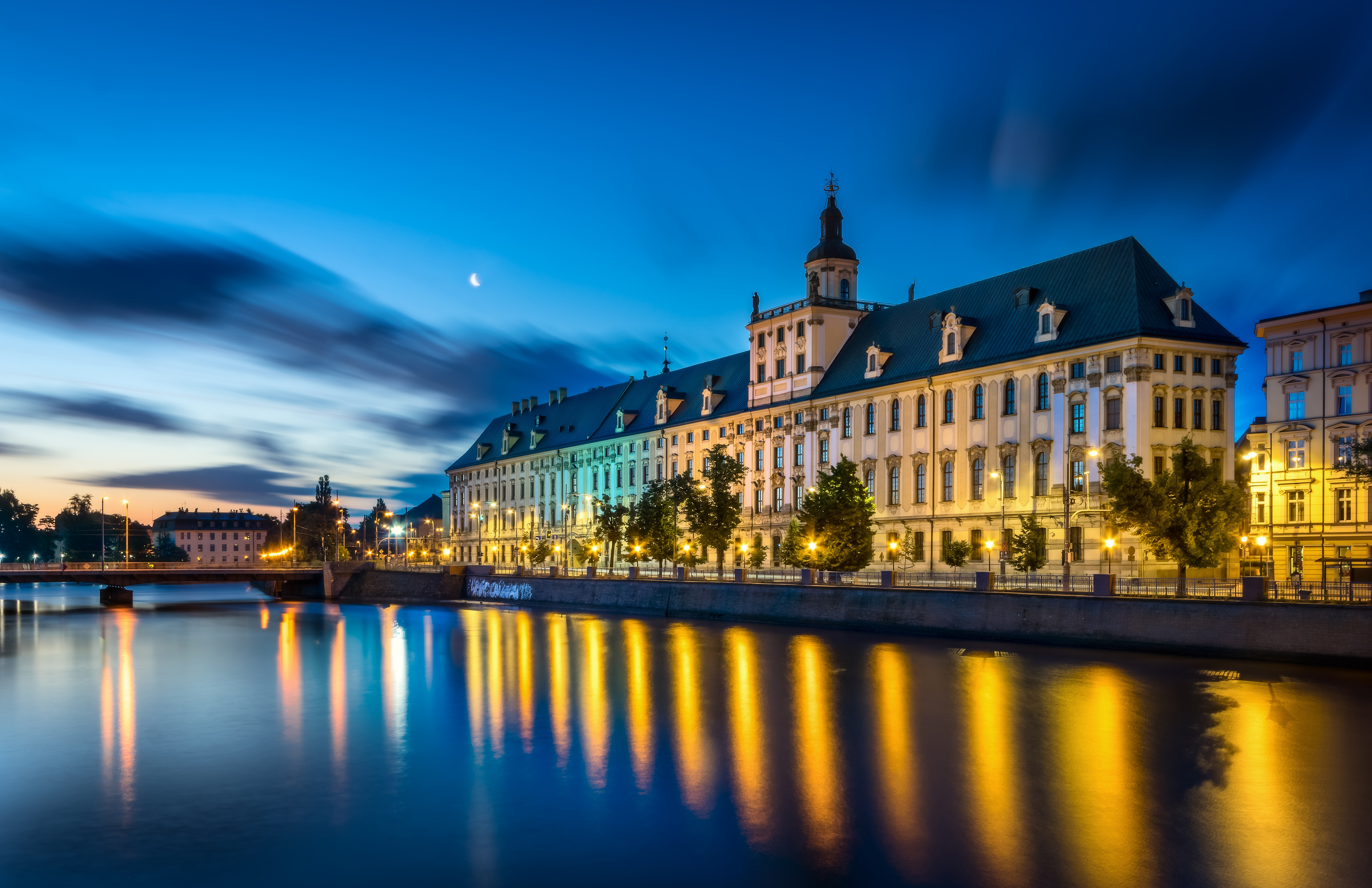
The main building of the University of Wrocław, built on the site of a medieval castle

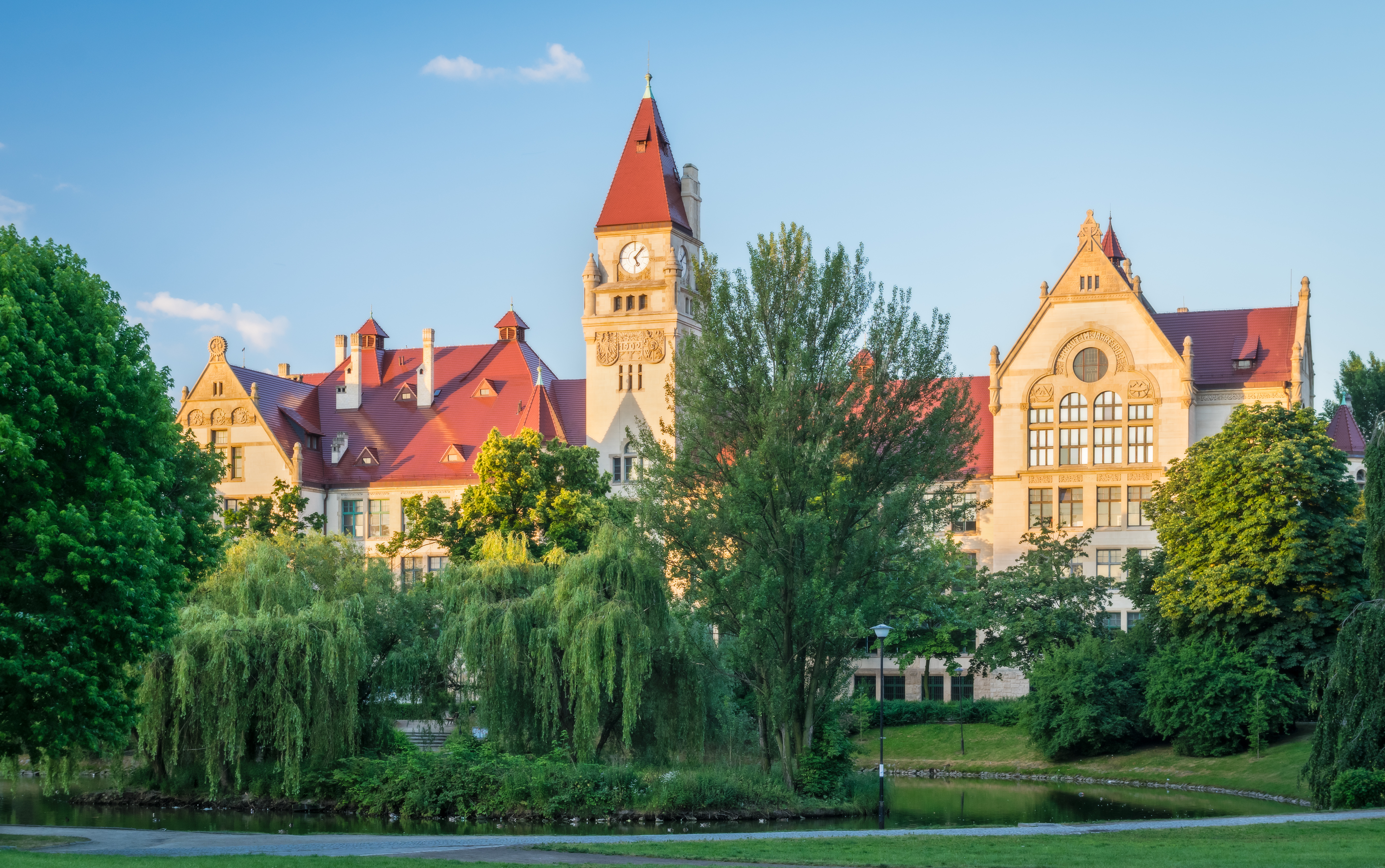
The Wrocław University of Technology – Faculty of Architecture

Wrocław is the third largest educational centre of Poland, with 135,000 students in 30 colleges which employ some 7,400 staff. The city is home to ten public colleges and universities. The University of Wrocław (Uniwersytet Wrocławski) has over 47,000 students, and was ranked fourth among public universities in Poland by the Wprost weekly ranking in 2007. The Wrocław University of Technology (Politechnika Wrocławska) has over 20,000 students, and was considered the best university of technology in Poland by the Wprost in 2007.

The Wrocław University of Economics (Uniwersytet Ekonomiczny we Wrocławiu) has over 18,000 students, and is ranked fifth best among public economic universities in Poland by the Wprost weekly ranking in 2007. The Wrocław University of Environmental and Life Sciences (Uniwersytet Przyrodniczy we Wrocławiu) has over 13,000 students, and ranked the third best among public agricultural universities in Poland by the Wprost weekly ranking in 2007.

Institutions include the Wrocław Medical University (Uniwersytet Medyczny we Wrocławiu), the University School of Physical Education in Wrocław, the Academy of Fine Arts in Wrocław (Akademia Sztuk Pięknych we Wrocławiu), the Karol Lipiński University of Music (Akademia Muzyczna im. Karola Lipińskiego we Wrocławiu), the Ludwik Solski Academy for the Dramatic Arts, Wrocław Campus (Państwowa Wyższa Szkoła Teatralna w Krakowie filia we Wrocławiu), and the Tadeusz Kościuszko Land Forces Military Academy (Wyższa Szkoła Oficerska Wojsk Lądowych).

Private universities include the Wyższa Szkoła Bankowa (University of Business in Wrocław), the University of Social Sciences and Humanities (SWPS Uniwersytet Humanistycznospołeczny), the University of Law (Wyższa Szkoła Prawa), and Coventry University Wrocław (a campus branch of the Coventry University, UK). Other cultural institutions based in Wrocław arę the Alliance Française in Wrocław, the Austrian Institute in Wrocław, the British Council in Wrocław, the Dante Alighieri Society in Wrocław, and the Grotowski Institute in Wrocław.

== Culture and landmarks ==
=== Old Town ===
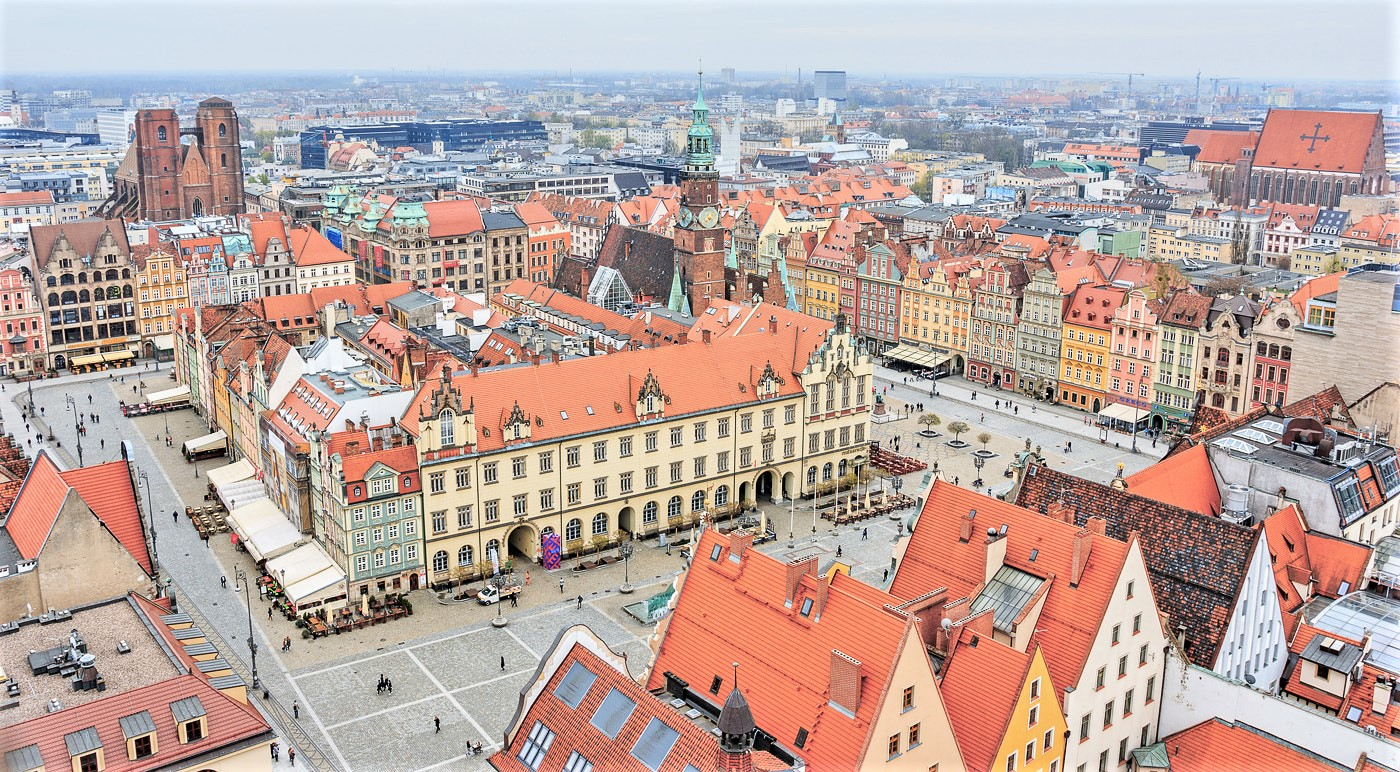
Wrocław Old Town

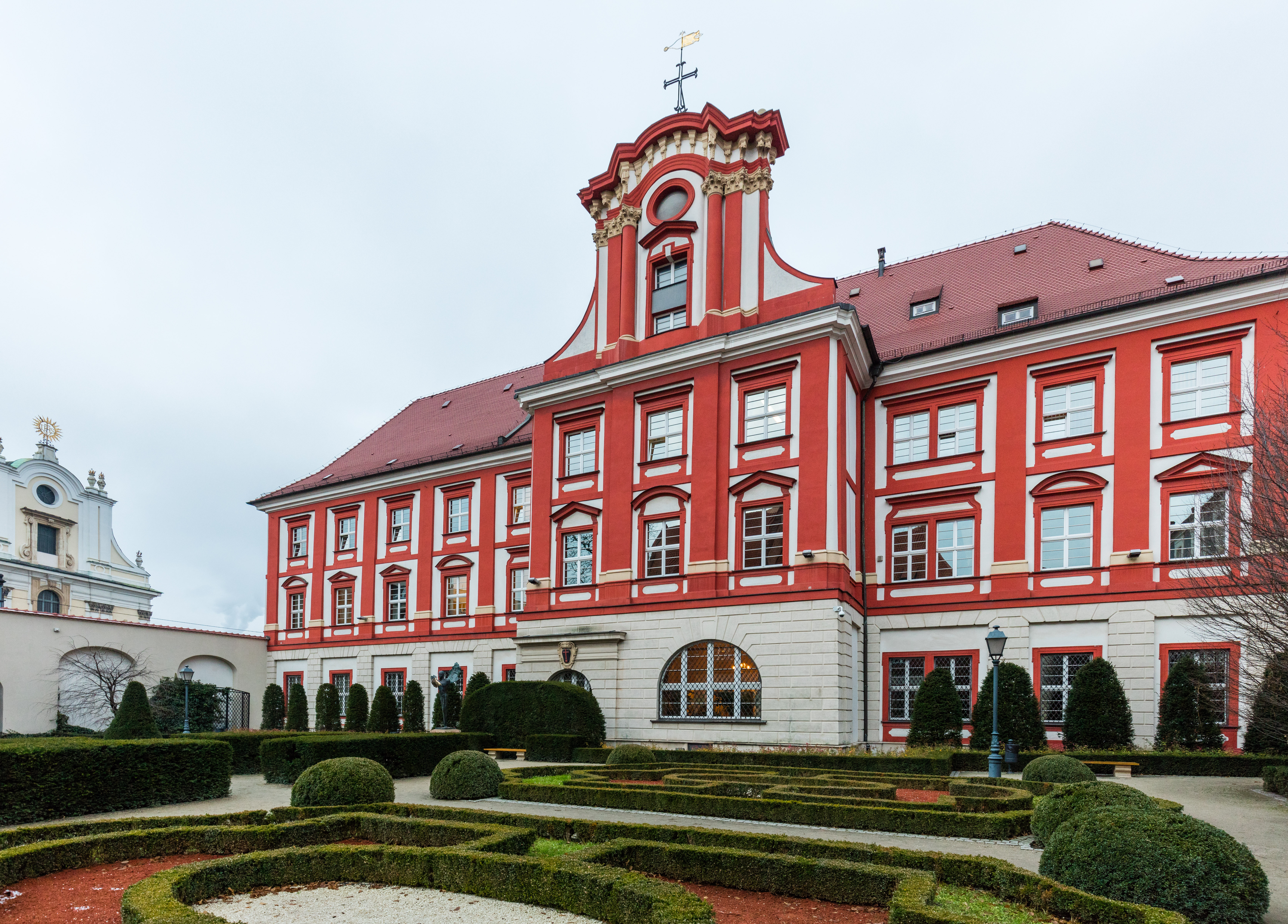
Ossolineum

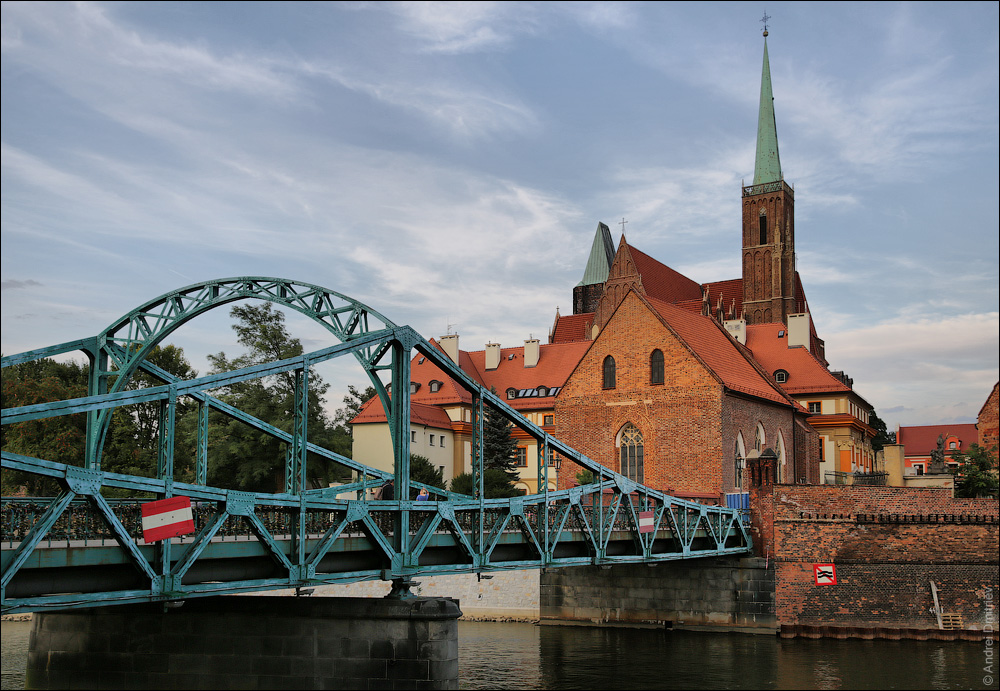
Cathedral Island - Tumski Bridge and Collegiate Church of the Holy Cross and St. Bartholomew

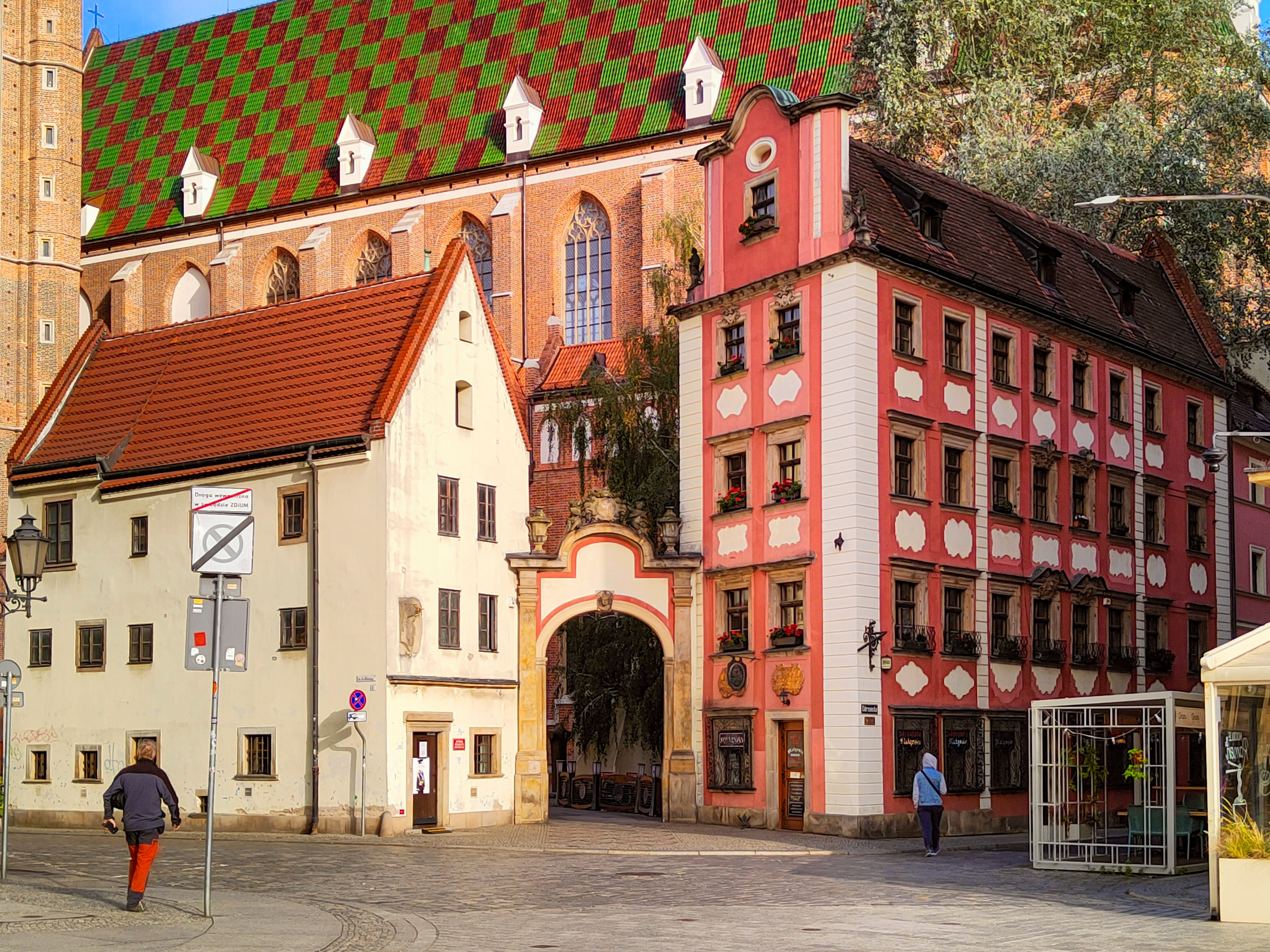
Two houses known as Jaś i Małgosia

The Old Town of Wrocław is listed in the Registry of Objects of Cultural Heritage and on Poland's list of National Monuments. Its historic buildings include examples of Brick Gothic and Baroque architecture. Examples of Neoclassicism, Gründerzeit and Historicism can also be found in the city centre. The Wrocław Opera House, Monopol Hotel, University Library, Ossolineum, the National Museum and the castle-like District Court are among some of the grandest and most recognisable historic structures in the city. There are several examples of Art Nouveau and Modernism in pre-war retail establishments such as the Barasch-Feniks, Petersdorff-Kameleon and Renoma department stores.

The Ostrów Tumski (Cathedral Island) is the oldest section of the city. It was once an isolated islet between the branches of the Oder River. The Wrocław Cathedral, one of the tallest churches in Poland, was erected in the mid 10th century and expanded over later centuries. The island is home to five other Christian temples and churches (including the Collegiate Church of the Holy Cross and St. Bartholomew, whose scholaster was Nicolaus Copernicus, considered the city's second most important Catholic church, and the Church of Saint Giles, the city's oldest extant Romanesque church), the Archbishop's Palace, the Archdiocese Museum, a 9.5-metre 18th-century monument dedicated to Saint John of Nepomuk, historic tenements and the steel Tumski Bridge from 1889. A notable attraction are 102 original gas lanterns which are manually lit each evening by a cloaked lamplighter.

The early 13th-century Main Market Square (Rynek) is the oldest medieval public square in Poland, and one of the largest. The area of the main square together with the auxiliary square is 48,500 m^{2}. It features the ornate Gothic Old Town Hall, the oldest of its kind in the country. In the north-west corner of the square is St. Elisabeth's Church (Bazylika Św. Elżbiety) with its 91.5-metre-high tower and an observation deck at an altitude of 75 metres. Beneath the basilica are two small medieval houses connected by an arched gate that once led into a churchyard; these were reshaped into their current form in the 1700s. Today, the two connected buildings are known to the city's residents as "Jaś i Małgosia", named after the children's fairy tale characters from Hansel and Gretel.

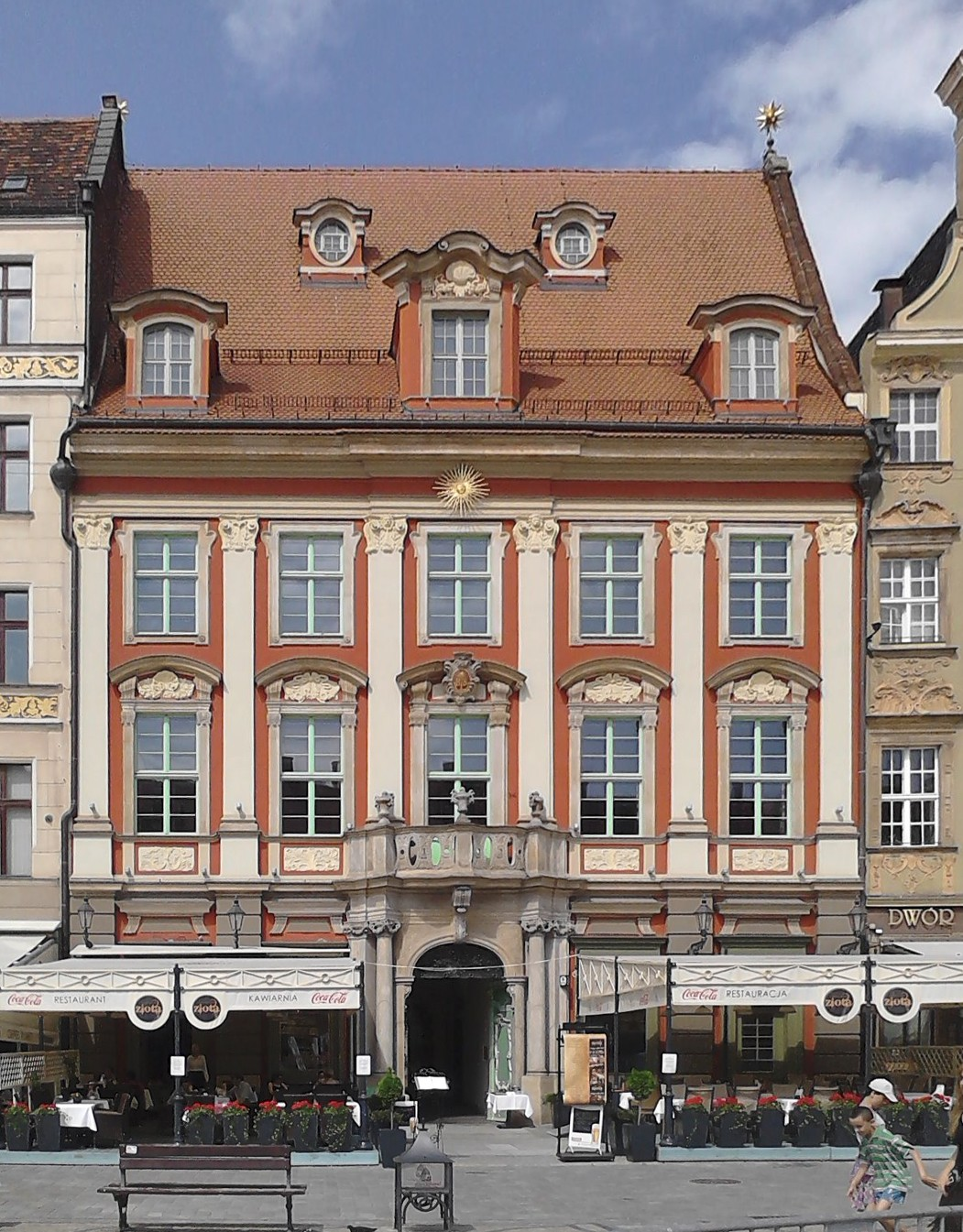
House under the Golden Sun, home of the Pan Tadeusz Museum

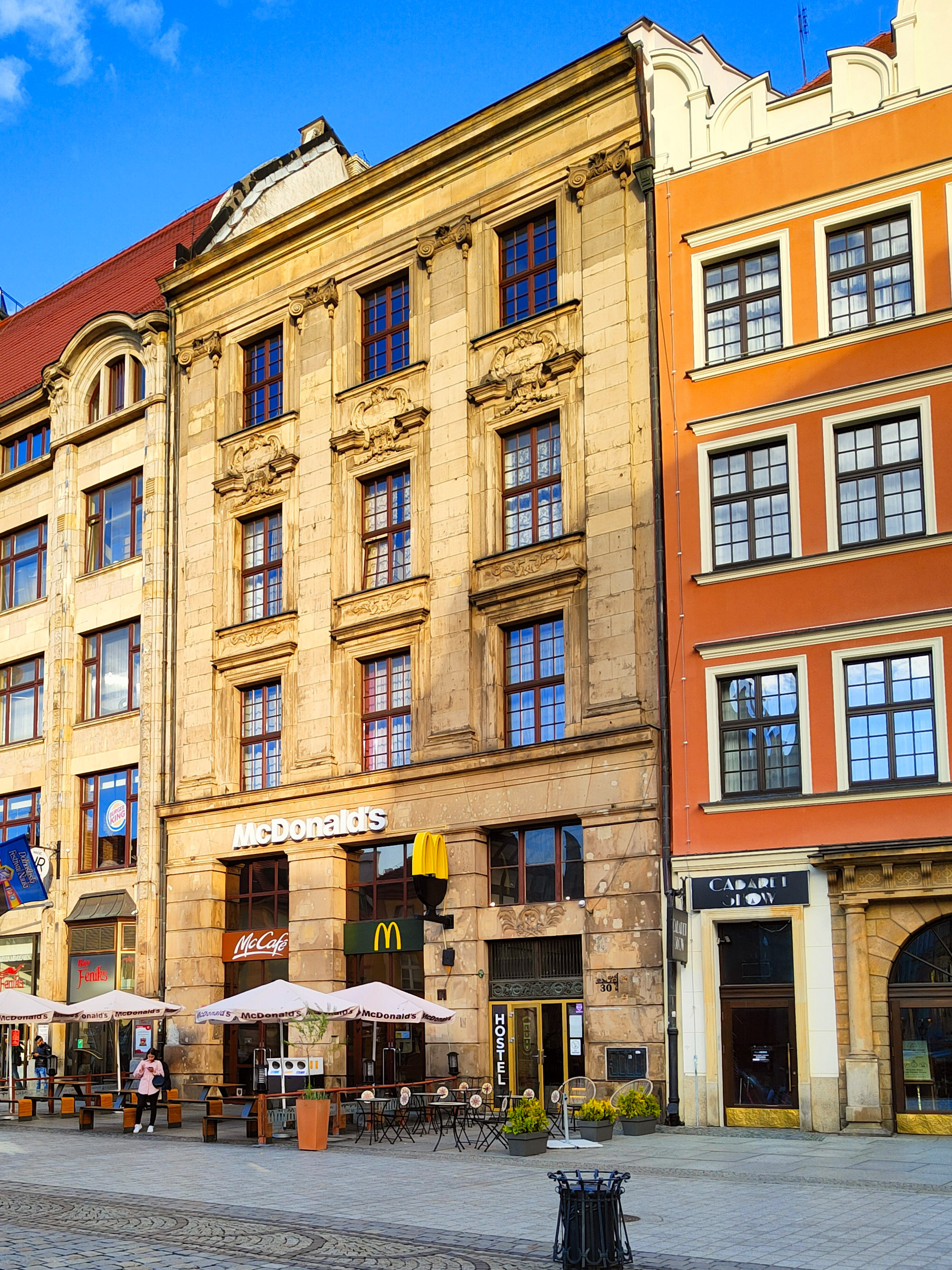
Former residence of Kings Augustus II the Strong and Augustus III of Poland during their stays in Wrocław

North of the church are so-called "shambles" (Polish: jatki), a former meat market with a Monument of Remembrance for Slaughtered Animals. The Salt Square, now a flower market, which opened in 1242, is located at the south-western corner of the Market Square. Close to the square, between Szewska and Łaciarska streets, is the domeless 13th-century St. Mary Magdalene Church, which in 1523 during the Reformation was converted into Wrocław's first Protestant temple.

The Cathedral of St. Vincent and St. James and the Holy Cross and St. Bartholomew's Collegiate Church are burial sites of Polish monarchs, Henry II the Pious and Henry IV Probus, respectively.

The Pan Tadeusz Museum, open since May 2016, is located in the "House under the Golden Sun" at 6 Market Square. The manuscript of the national epos, Pan Tadeusz, is housed there as part of the Ossolineum National Institute, with multimedia and interactive educational opportunities.

=== Tourism and places of interest ===
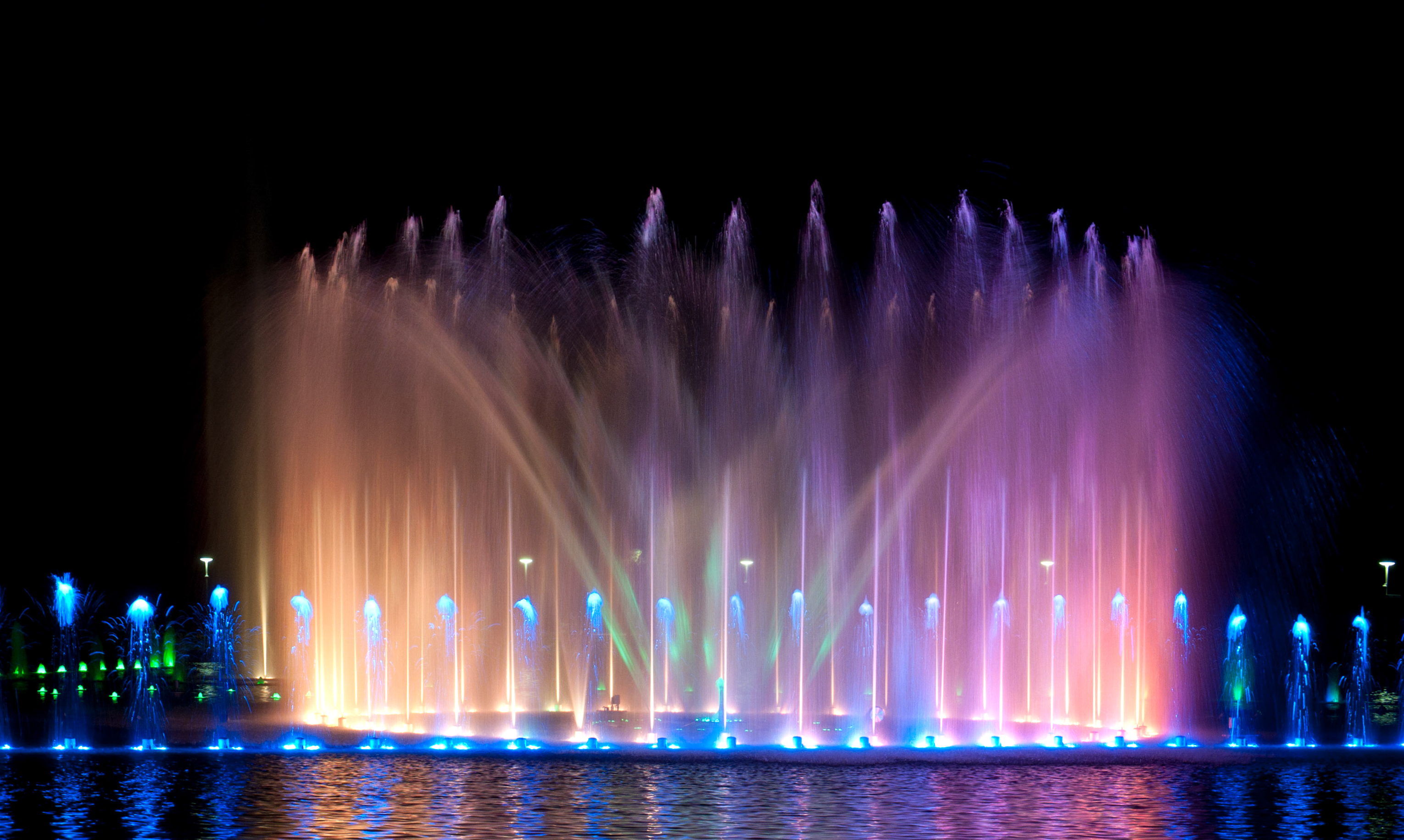
Wrocław Multimedia Fountain

The Tourist Information Centre (Polish: Centrum Informacji Turystycznej) is situated on the Main Market Square (Rynek) in building no 14. Wrocław has been visited by over 6 million tourists in 2024. Free wireless Internet (Wi-Fi) is available at a number of places around town.

Wrocław is a major attraction for both domestic and international tourists. Noteworthy landmarks include the Multimedia Fountain, Szczytnicki Park with its Japanese Garden, miniature park and dinosaur park, the Botanical Garden, Poland's largest railway model Kolejkowo, Hydropolis Centre for Ecological Education, University of Wrocław with Mathematical Tower, Church of the Name of Jesus, Wrocław water tower, the Royal Palace, ropes course on the Opatowicka Island, White Stork Synagogue, the Old Jewish Cemetery and the Cemetery of Italian Soldiers.

An interesting way to explore the city is seeking out Wrocław's dwarfs – over 800 small bronze figurines can be found across the city, on pavements, walls and lampposts. They first appeared in 2005.

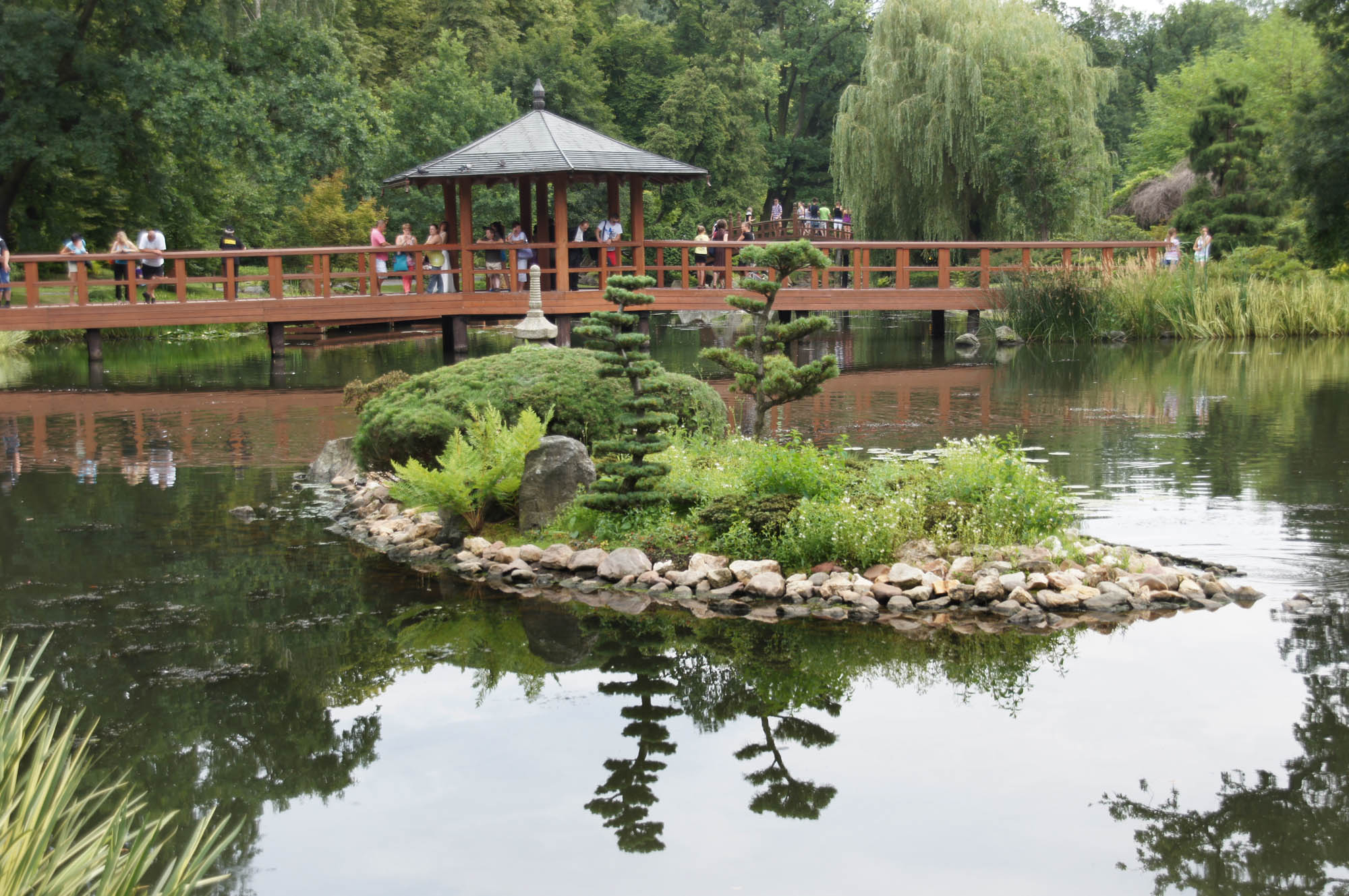
A Japanese garden within the city's Szczytnicki Park

The Racławice Panorama is a monumental cycloramic painting, done by Jan Styka and Wojciech Kossak, depicting the Battle of Racławice during the Kościuszko Uprising in 1794. The 15×114 meter panorama was originally located in Lwów and following the end of World War II it was brought to Wrocław.

Wrocław Zoo is home to the Africarium – the only space devoted solely to exhibiting the fauna of Africa with an oceanarium. It is the oldest zoological garden in Poland, established in 1865. It is the third-largest zoo in the world in terms of the number of animal species on display.

Small passenger vessels on the Oder offer river tours, as do historic trams or the converted open-topped historic buses Jelcz 043. In 2021, the Odra Centrum has opened, an educational centre on the river which is offering workshops, a library and kayak rentals.

The Centennial Hall (Hala Stulecia), designed by Max Berg in 1911–1913, is a World Heritage Site listed by UNESCO in 2006.

==== Museums ====
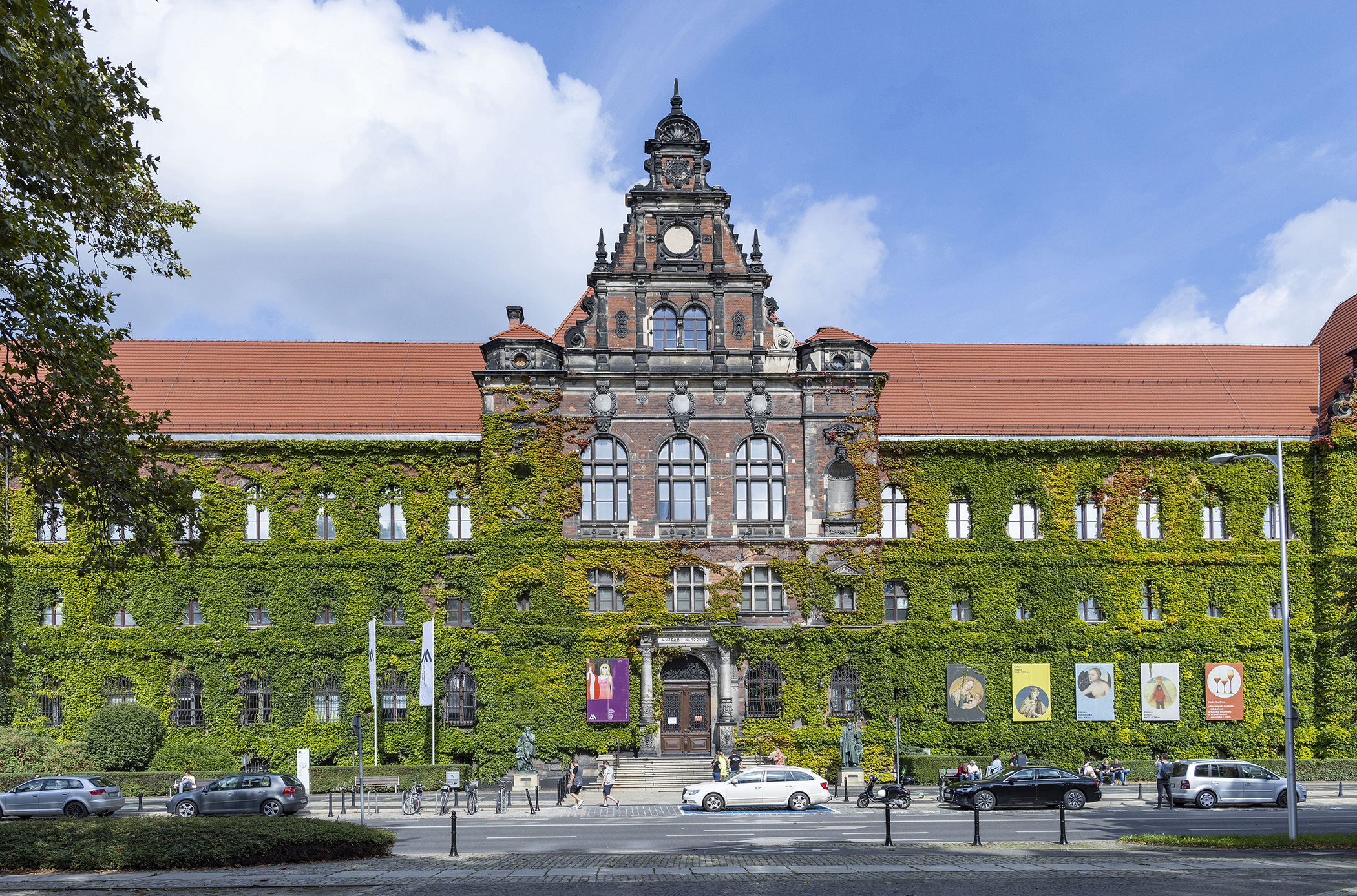
National Museum

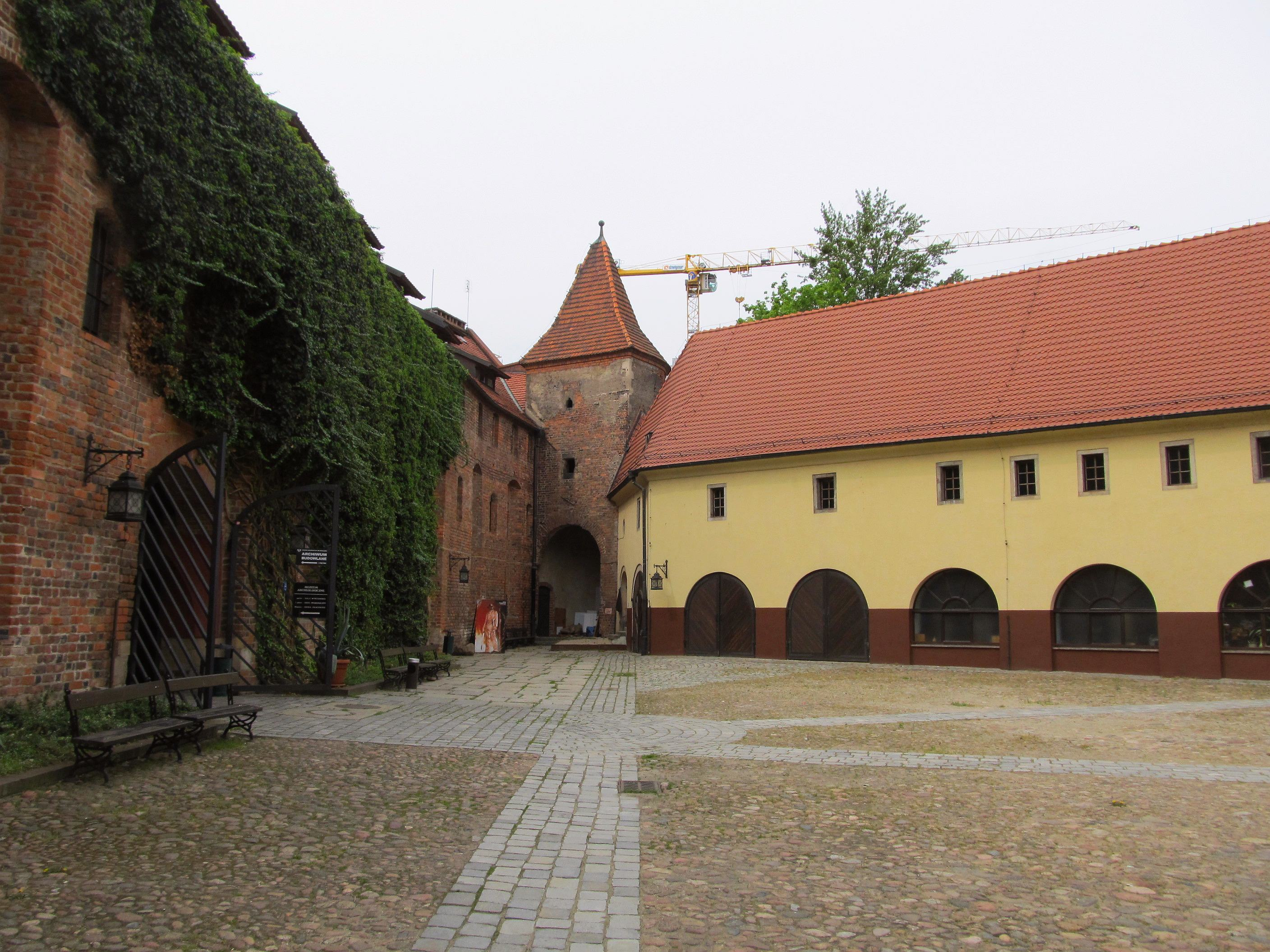
Archaeological Museum

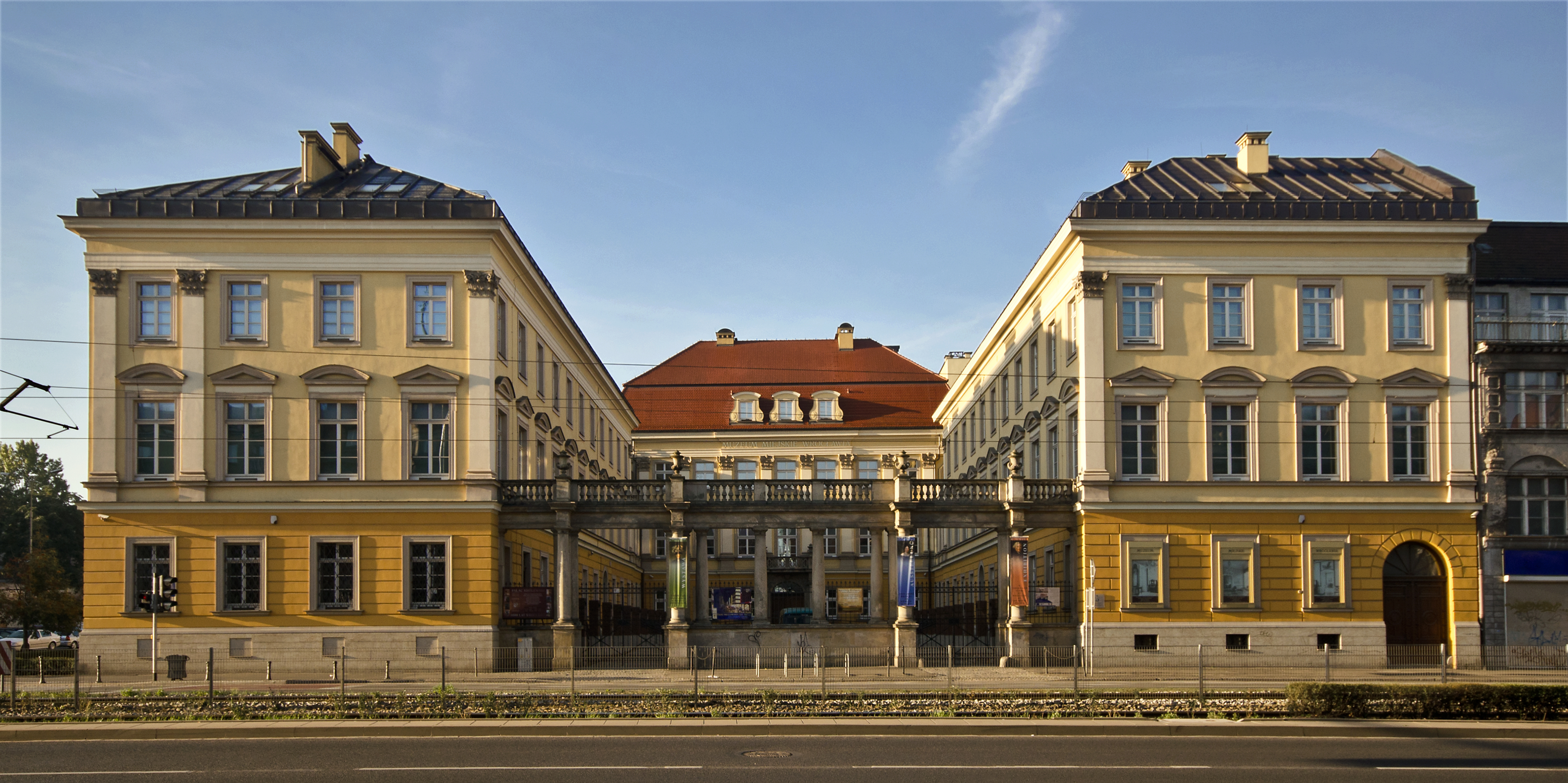
Historical Museum

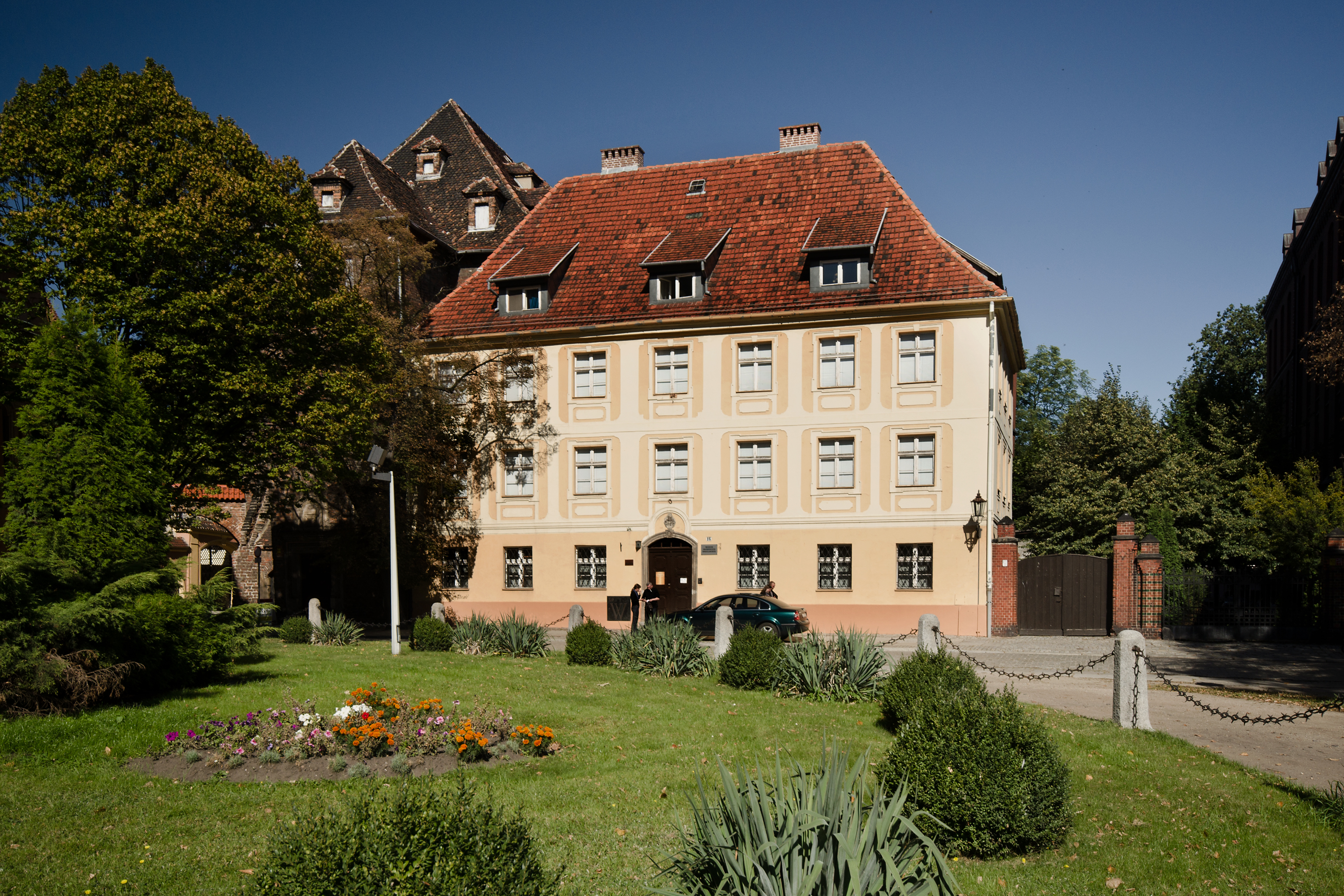
Archdiocesan Museum

The National Museum at Powstańców Warszawy Square, one of Poland's main branches of the National Museum system, holds one of the largest collections of contemporary art in the country.

Ossolineum is a National Institute and Library incorporating the Lubomirski Museum (pl), partially salvaged from the formerly Polish city of Lwów (now Lviv in Ukraine), containing items of international and national significance. It has a history of major World War II theft of collections after the invasion and takeover of Lwów by Nazi Germany and the Soviet Union.

Major museums include the City Museum of Wrocław (pl), Museum of Bourgeois Art in the Old Town Hall, Museum of Architecture, Archaeological Museum (pl), Museum of Natural History at University of Wrocław, Wrocław Contemporary Museum, Archdiocese Museum (pl), Galeria Awangarda, the Arsenal, Museum of Pharmacy (pl), Post and Telecommunications Museum (pl), Geological Museum (pl), the Mineralogical Museum (pl), Ethnographic Museum (pl). Recent openings of museums were the Historical Centrum Zajezdnia (opened in 2016), the OP ENHEIM Gallery (opened in 2018), and the Museum of Illusions (opened in 2021).

==== Entertainment ====
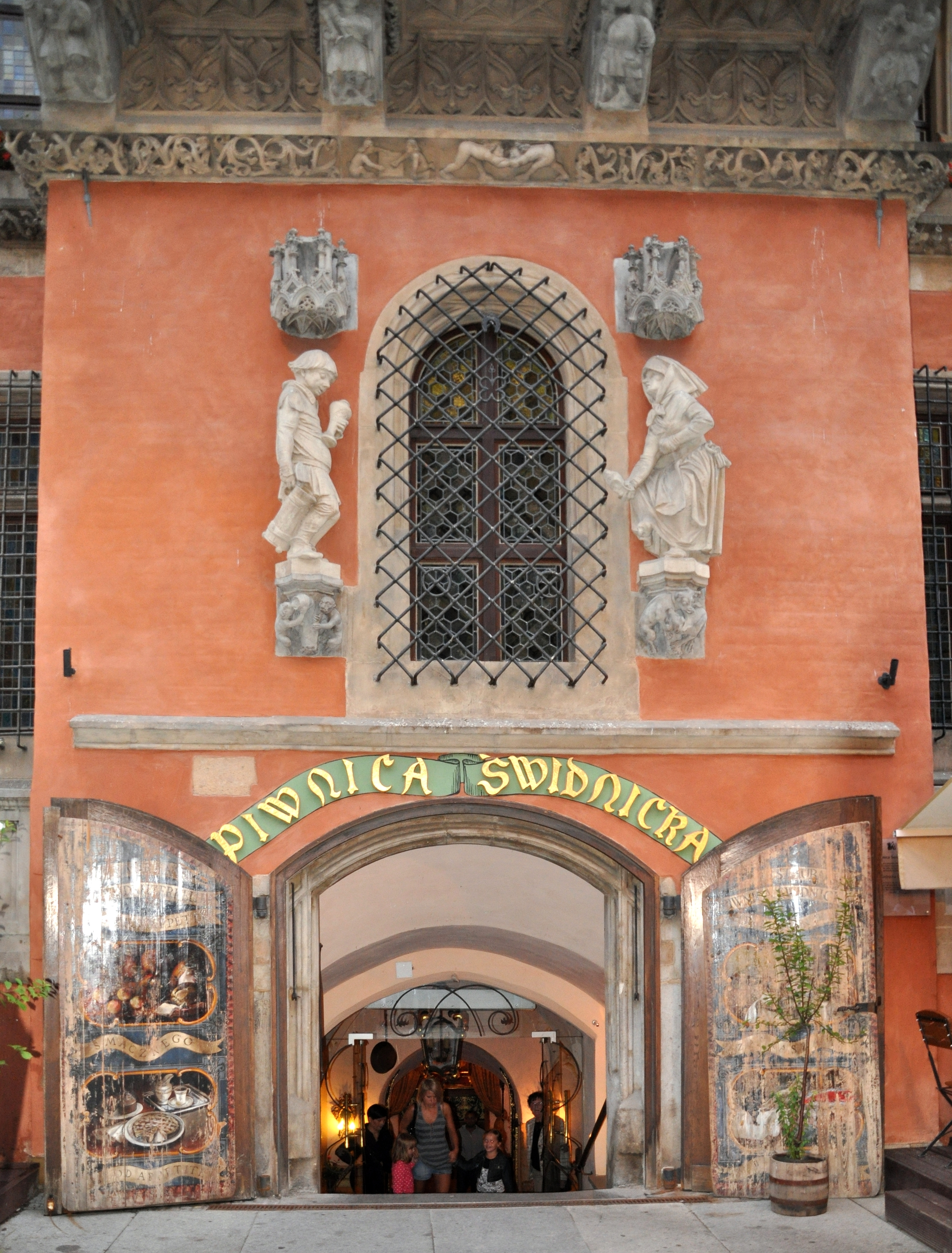
Świdnica Cellar (Piwnica Świdnicka), one of the oldest restaurant establishments in Europe.

The city is well known for its large number of nightclubs and pubs. Many are in or near the Market Square, and in the Niepolda passage, the railway wharf on the Bogusławskiego street. The basement of the old City Hall houses one of the oldest restaurants in Europe—Piwnica Świdnicka, operating since 1273, while the basement of the new City Hall contains the brewpub Spiż. Next to the market there is also brewpubs Browar Staromiejski Złoty Pies, while in other parts of the city two others brewpubs - Browar Stu Mostów and Browar Rodzinny Prost.

Mostly on the second weekend of June, the Festival of Good Beer takes place. It is the biggest beer festival in Poland.

In November and December the Christmas market is held at the Main Market Square.

=== In literature ===
The history of Wrocław is described in minute detail in the monograph Microcosm: Portrait of a Central European City by Norman Davies and Roger Moorhouse. A number of books have been written about Wrocław following World War II.

Wrocław philologist and writer Marek Krajewski wrote a series of crime novels about detective Eberhard Mock, a fictional character from the city of Breslau. Michał Kaczmarek published Wrocław according to Eberhard Mock – Guide based on the books by Marek Krajewski. In 2011, appeared the 1,104-page Lexicon of the architecture of Wrocław and in 2013 a 960-page Lexicon about the greenery of Wrocław. In 2019, Wrocław was recognised as a UNESCO City of Literature. Wrocław was designated as the World Book Capital for 2016 by UNESCO. The Noble prize winner Olga Tokarczuk is closely tied with the Wrocław poetic scene, having been awarded the Honorary Citizenship of Wrocław in 2019 and regularly living part-time in Wrocław.

=== Films, music and theatre ===
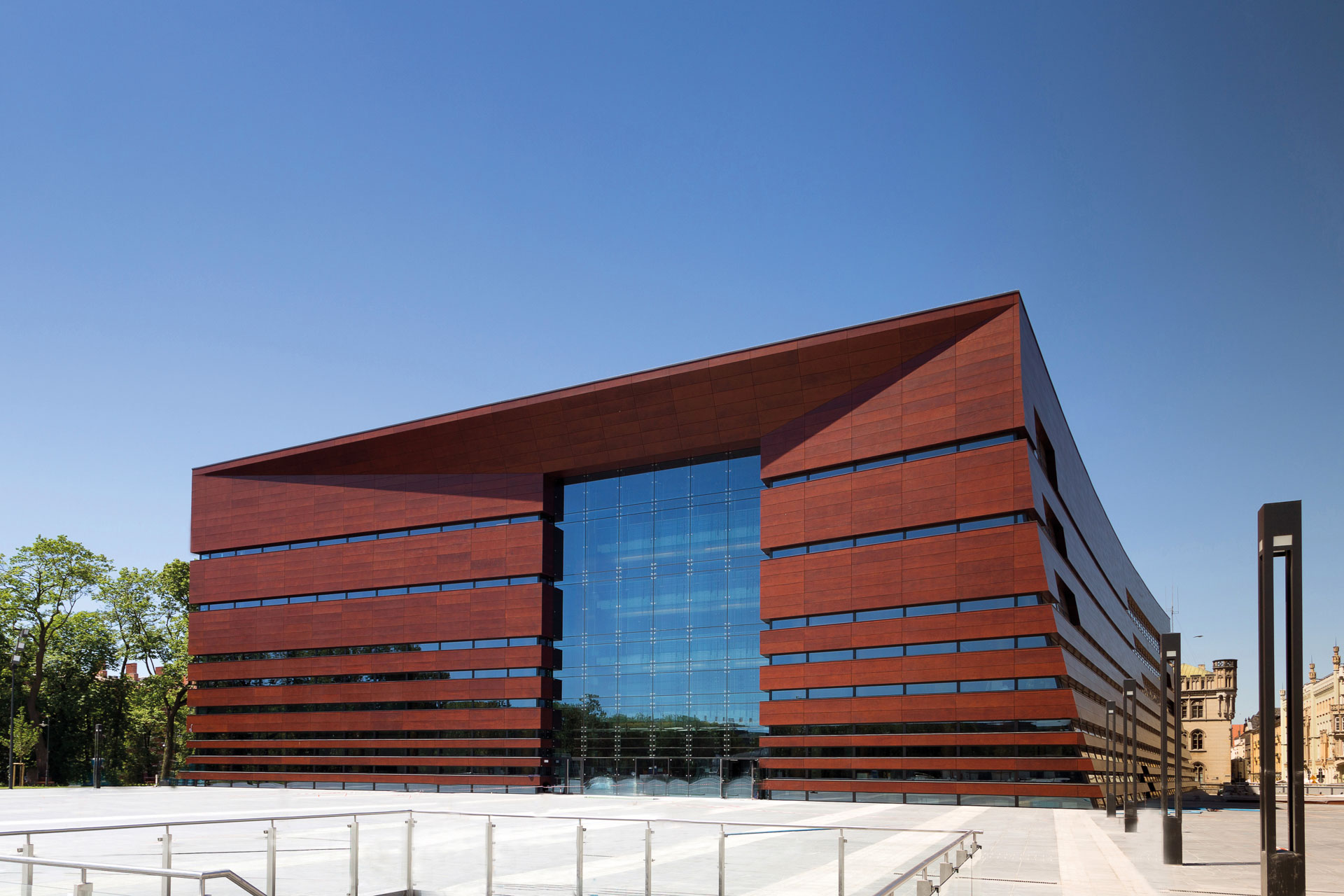
National Forum of Music

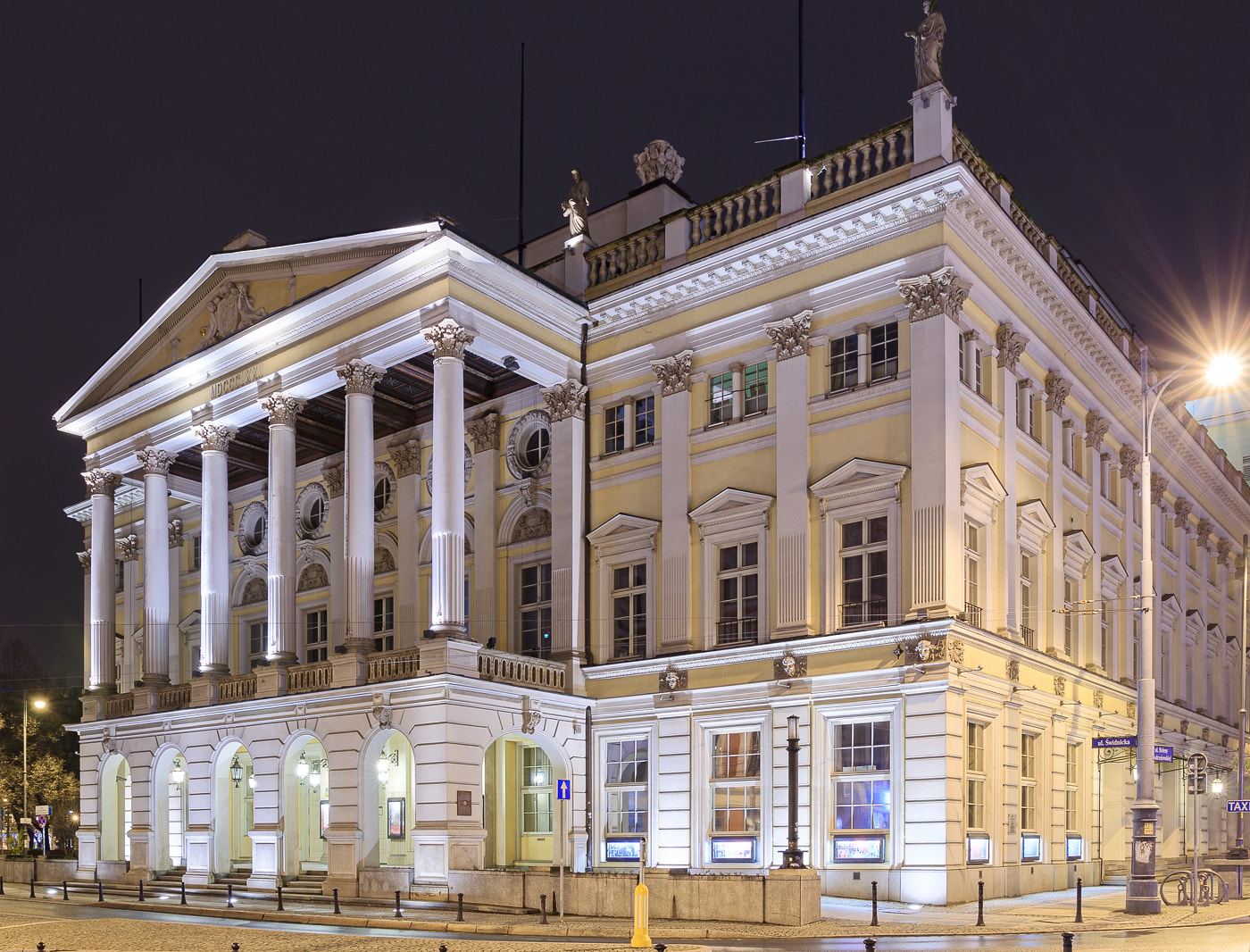
Wrocław Opera

Wrocław is home to the Wroclaw Feature Film Studio (Wytwórnia Filmów Fabularnych), the Film Stuntman School, ATM Grupa, Grupa 13, and Polot Media (formerly Tako Media).

Film directors Andrzej Wajda, Krzysztof Kieślowski, Sylwester Chęciński, among others, made their film debuts in Wrocław. Numerous movies shot around the city include Plague, Ashes and Diamonds, The Saragossa Manuscript, Sami swoi, Lalka, A Lonely Woman, Character, Big Shu, Consul, Aimée & Jaguar, Avalon, A Woman in Berlin, Suicide Room, The Winner, 80 Million, Run Boy Run, Bridge of Spies, Hiszpanka, Breaking the Limits.

Numerous Polish TV-series were also shot in Wrocław, notably Świat według Kiepskich, Pierwsza miłość, Bodo, Belfer, The Mire, High Water, Breslau, Black Death, Killing Miss.

Also some episodes Four Tank-Men and a Dog and More Than Life At Stake were filmed in Wrocław.

There are several theatres and theatre groups, including Polish Theatre (Teatr Polski) with three stages, and Contemporary Theatre (Wrocławski Teatr Współczesny). The International Theatre Festival Dialog-Wrocław is held every two years.

Wrocław's opera traditions are dating back to the first half of the seventeenth century and sustained by the Wrocław Opera, built between 1839 and 1841. Wrocław Philharmonic, established in 1954 by Wojciech Dzieduszycki is also important for music lovers. The National Forum of Music was opened in 2015 and is a notable landmark, designed by the Polish architectural firm, Kurylowicz & Associates.

== Sport ==
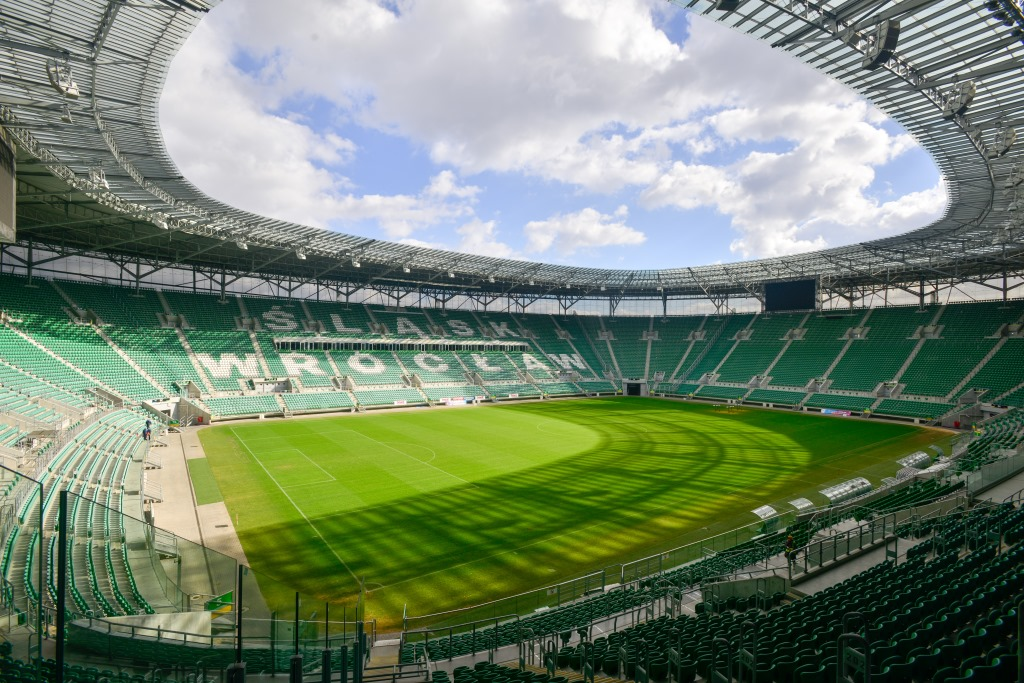
Wrocław Stadium – Euro 2012 Stadium

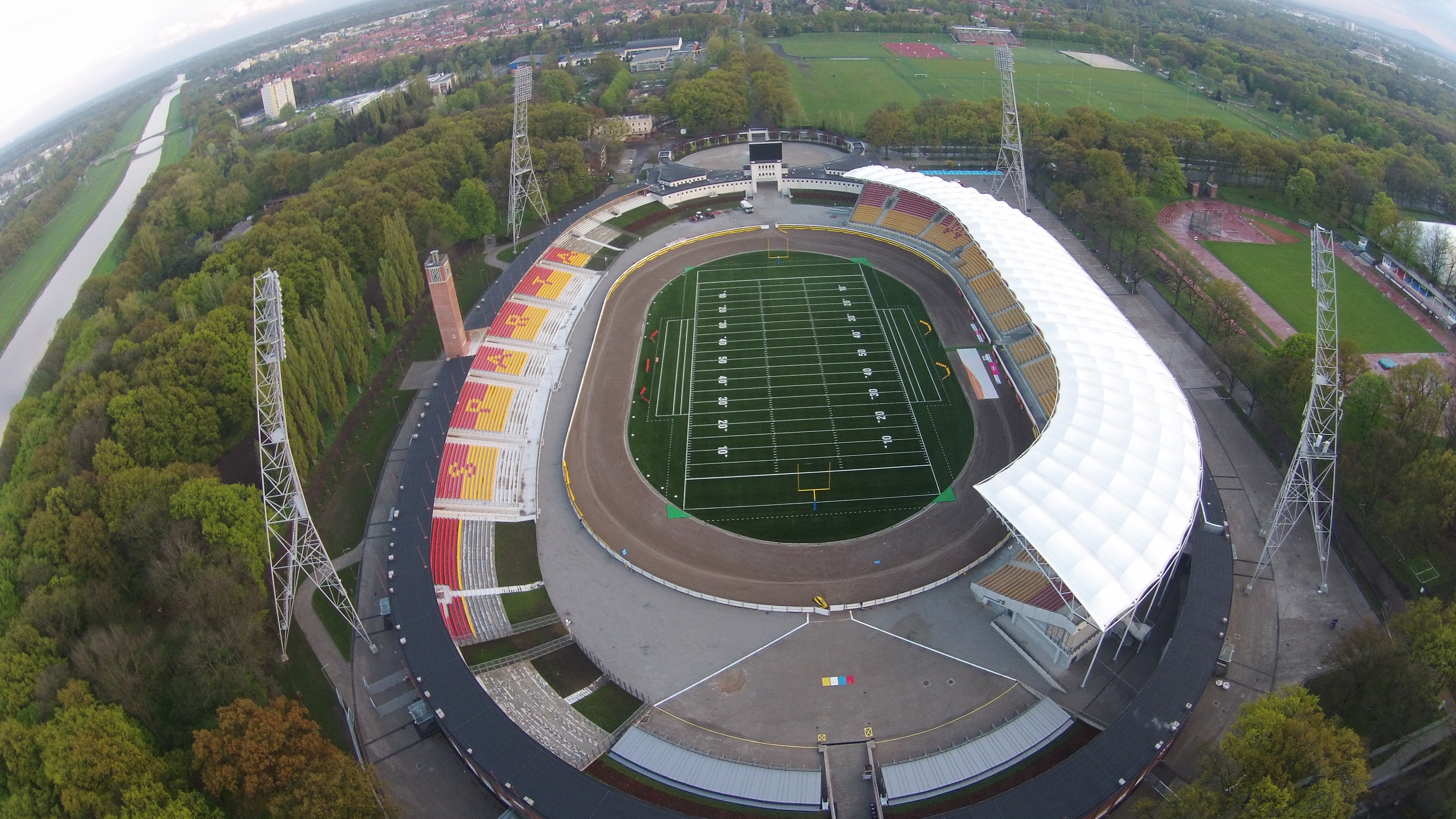
Olympic Stadium

The area of Wrocław is home to many professional sports teams. The most popular sport is football (Śląsk Wrocław club – Polish Champion in 1977 and 2012), followed by basketball (Śląsk Wrocław Basketball Club – award-winning men's basketball team and 17-time Polish Champion).

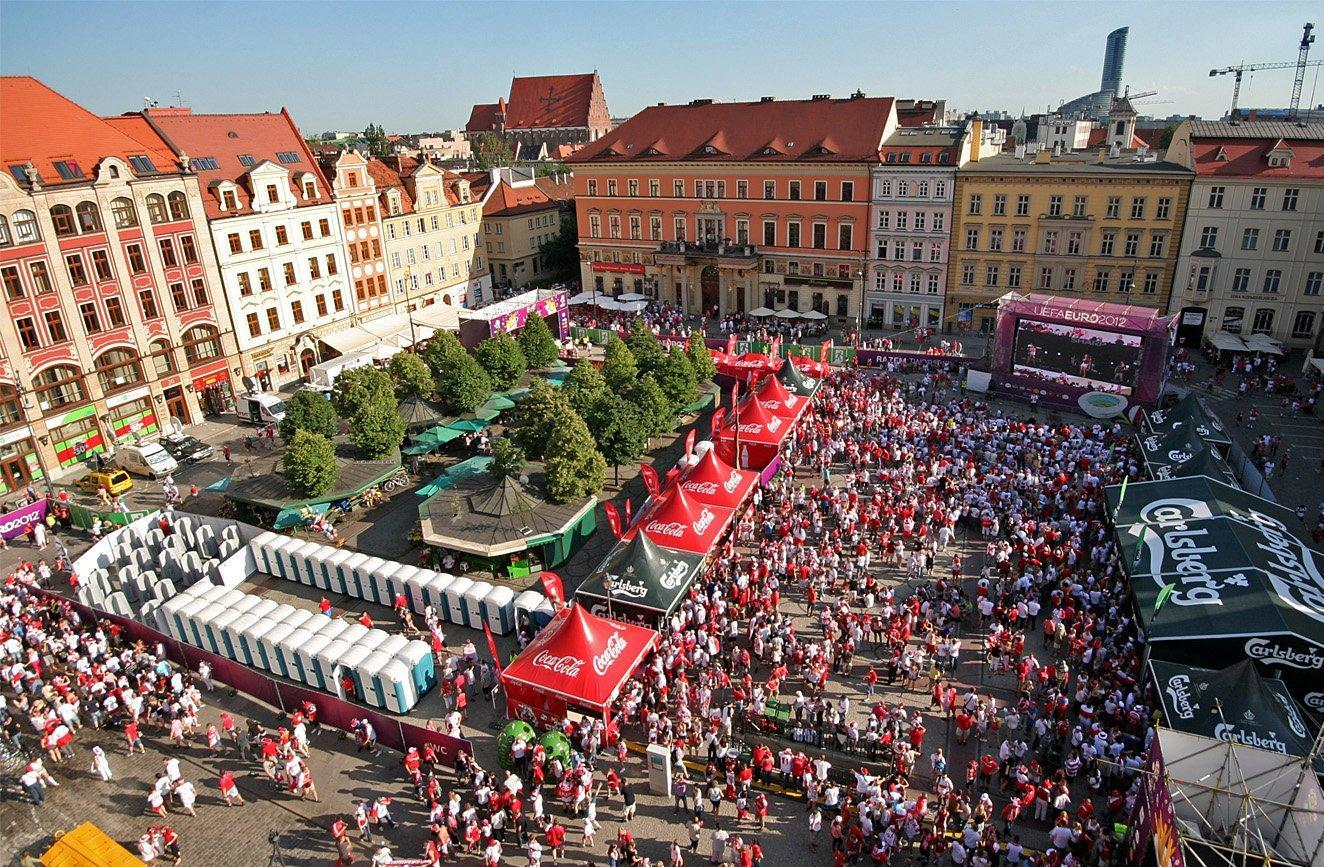
UEFA Euro 2012 fan zone in Wrocław

Matches of Group A UEFA Euro 2012's were held at Wrocław at the Municipal Stadium. Matches of EuroBasket 1963 and EuroBasket 2009, as well as 2009 Women's European Volleyball Championship, 2014 FIVB Volleyball Men's World Championship and 2016 European Men's Handball Championship were also held in Wrocław. Wrocław was the host of the 2013 World Weightlifting Championships and will the host World Championship 2016 of Duplicate bridge and World Games 2017, a competition in 37 non-Olympic sport disciplines.

The Olympic Stadium in Wrocław hosts the Speedway Grand Prix of Poland. It is also the home arena of the popular motorcycle speedway club WTS Sparta Wrocław, five-time Polish Champion.

Wrocław also hosts the Wrocław Open, a professional tennis tournament that is part of the ATP Challenger Tour.

=== Men's sports ===
- Śląsk Wrocław: men's football team, Polish Championship in Football 1977, 2012; Polish Cup winner 1976, 1987; Polish SuperCup winner 1987, 2012; Polish League Cup winner 2009. Now in Ekstraklasa (Polish Premier League).
- WTS Sparta Wrocław: motorcycle speedway team, five-time Polish Champion.
- Śląsk Wrocław: men's basketball team, 18 times Polish Champion, six times runner-up, 15 times third place; 12 times Polish Cup winner.
- Śląsk Wrocław: men's handball team, 15-time Polish Champion.
- Gwardia Wrocław: volleyball team, three-time Polish Champion.
- KS Rugby Wrocław: rugby union team.
- Panthers Wrocław: American football team. Panthers joined European League of Football (ELF) which is an eight-team professional league, the first league in Europe since the demise of NFL Europe. The Panthers will start playing games against teams from Germany and Spain in June 2021.
- The 2025 UEFA Conference League Final between English side Chelsea and Spanish side Real Betis took place at Stadion Wrocław in Wrocław, Poland, on Wednesday 28 May 2025. Chelsea won the match 4–1.

=== Women's sports ===
- Ślęza Wrocław: women's basketball team, two-times Polish Champion.
- WKS Śląsk Wrocław (formerly KŚ AZS Wrocław): women's football team.
- AZS AWF Wrocław: women's handball team.
- AZS AE Wrocław: women's table tennis team.

== Notable people ==
- Alois Alzheimer (1864–1915), psychiatrist and neuropathologist
- Adolf Anderssen, chess master
- Đorđe Andrejević-Kun, painter
- Natalia Avelon, actress
- Max Berg, architect
- Agnieszka Kotlarska (1972–1996), Miss International 1991
- Max Bielschowsky (1869–1940), neuropathologist
- Dietrich Bonhoeffer, theologian, anti-Nazi dissident
- Edmund Bojanowski, blessed of the Catholic Church
- Max Born (1882–1970), theoretical physicist and mathematician, Nobel laureate
- Leszek Czarnecki, businessman
- Sławomir Dobrzański, pianist and musicologist
- Hermann von Eichhorn, Prussian field marshal
- Artur Ekert (born 1961), physicist
- Hermann Fernau, lawyer
- Heinz Fraenkel-Conrat (1910–1999), biochemist and virologist
- Jolanta Fraszyńska, actress
- Hans Freeman (1929–2008), biochemist
- Henryk Gulbinowicz, archbishop
- Jerzy Grotowski, theater director
- Clara Immerwahr, chemist
- Zygmunt Haas, computer scientist
- Fritz Haber (1868–1934), chemist and Nobel laureate
- Felix Hausdorff (1868–1942), mathematician
- Mirosław Hermaszewski, astronaut
- Ludwik Hirszfeld (1884–1954), discoverer of blood groups
- Hubert Hurkacz, tennis player
- Lech Janerka, musician
- Alfred Kerr, German-Jewish critic
- Friedrich Heinrich von Kittlitz, artist, explorer and naturalist.
- Hedwig Kohn (1887–1964), physicist
- August Kopisch, poet
- Arthur Korn (1870–1945), physicist, mathematician and inventor
- Agnieszka Kotlarska, model, Miss Poland and Miss International
- Urszula Kozioł, poet
- Heinrich Gerhard Kuhn (1904–1994), physicist
- Marek Krajewski, writer and linguist
- Wojciech Kurtyka, mountaineer
- Aleksandra Kurzak, operatic soprano
- Carl Gotthard Langhans, architect
- Ferdinand Lassalle, initiator of the social-democratic movement in Germany
- Olaf Lubaszenko, actor and film director
- Hugo Lubliner, dramatist
- Olga Malinkiewicz (born 1982), physicist and inventor
- Jan Mikulicz-Radecki, surgeon, inventor of the surgical mask
- Aharon Mor, Polish-born Israeli civil servant
- Mateusz Morawiecki, politician, former Prime minister of Poland
- Alexander Moszkowski, satirist, writer and philosopher
- Moritz Moszkowski, composer, pianist, and teacher
- Ruth Neudeck, German SS death camps supervisor and war criminal
- Rafał Omelko, athlete
- Kurd Lasswitz (1848-1910) author, philosopher, and scientist
- Heinrich Pick (1882–1947), jurist
- Sepp Piontek (1940–2026), footballer and manager
- Piotr Ponikowski, cardiologist
- Margaret Pospiech, writer, filmmaker
- Michael Oser Rabin (1931–2026), mathematician and computer scientist
- Manfred von Richthofen, fighter pilot
- Klaus Roth (1925–2015), mathematician
- Tadeusz Różewicz, poet and dramatist
- Wanda Rutkiewicz, mountaineer
- Julius von Sachs (1832–1897), botanist
- Auguste Schmidt, educationist and feminist
- Marlene Schmidt, Miss Germany 1961, Miss Universe 1961
- Eva Siewert, journalist and lesbian activist
- Angelus Silesius (Johann Scheffler), convert from Protestantism to Roman Catholicism, mystic and religious poet
- Max Simon, Waffen-SS officer
- Karl Slotta (1895–1987), biochemist
- Agnes Sorma, actress
- Daniel Speer, author, composer
- Eva Stachniak, writer
- Edith Stein, philosopher and Roman Catholic martyr
- Charles Proteus Steinmetz, electrical engineer
- Fritz Stern, historian
- Julius Stern, composer
- William Stern, psychologist
- August Tholuck, theologian
- Olga Tokarczuk, writer, Nobel laureate in Literature
- Jan Tomaszewski, footballer
- Dagmara Wozniak (born 1988), Polish-American U.S. Olympic sabre fencer
- Ludwig von Zanth (1796–1857), architect

== International relations ==
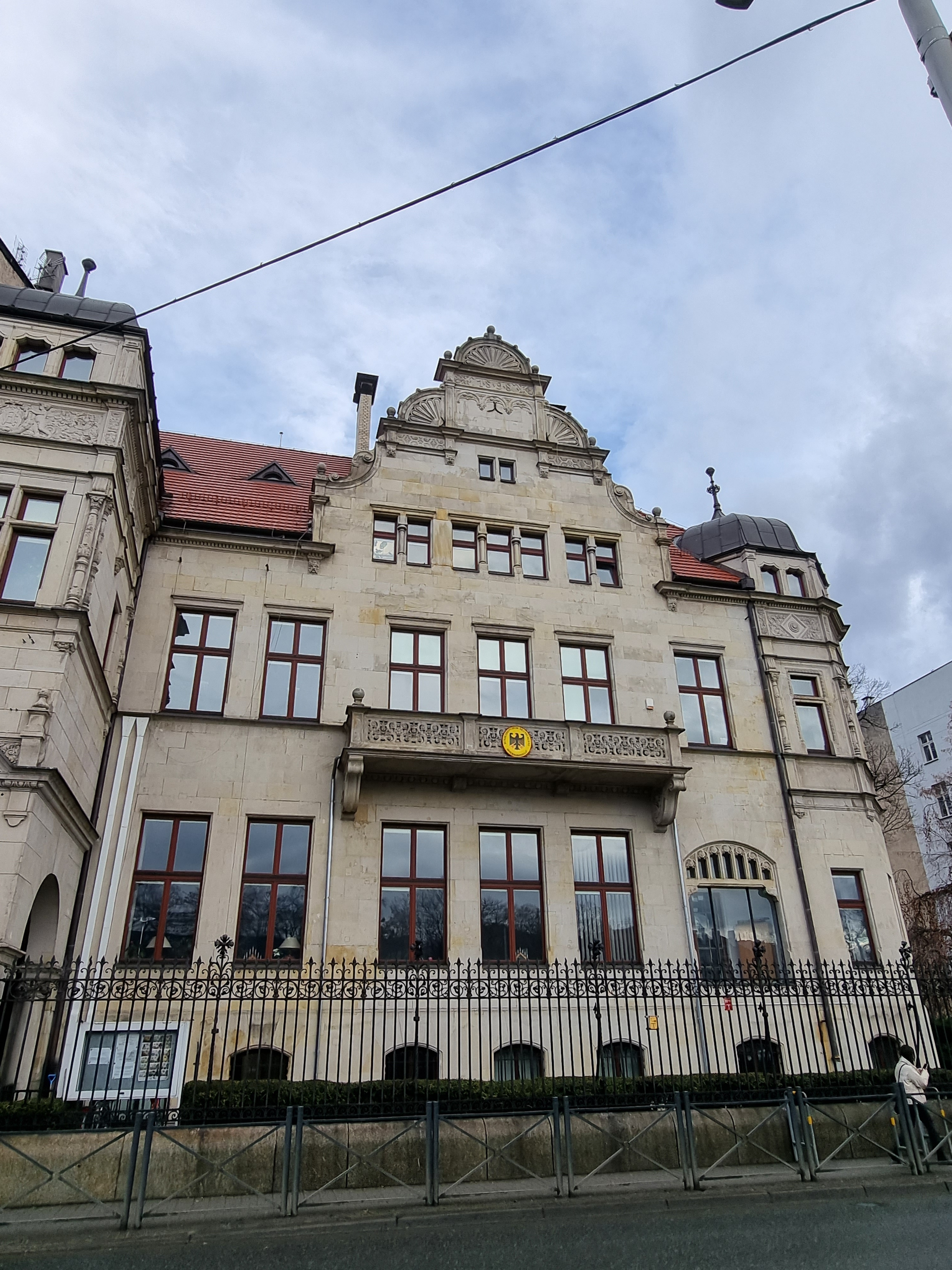
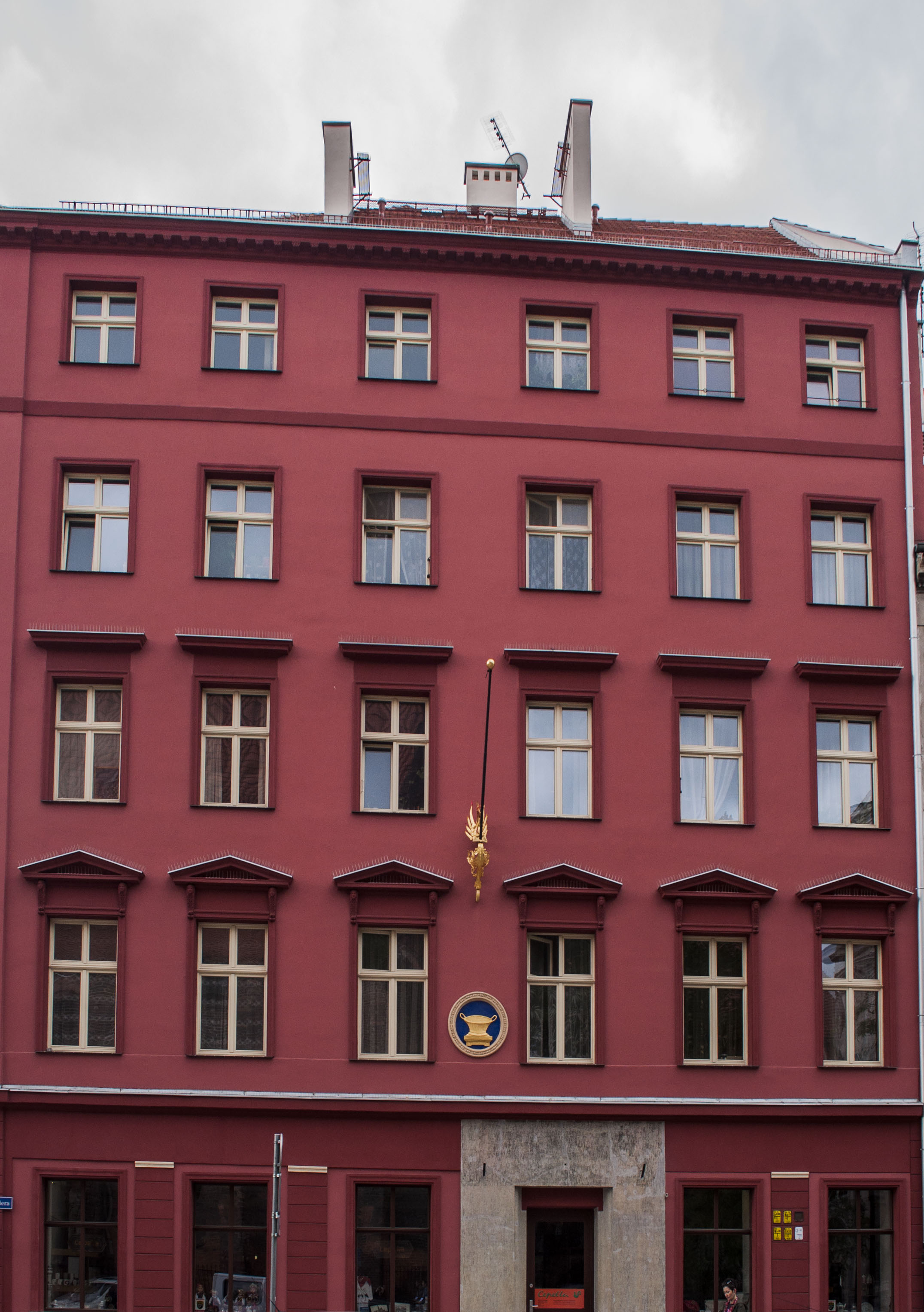
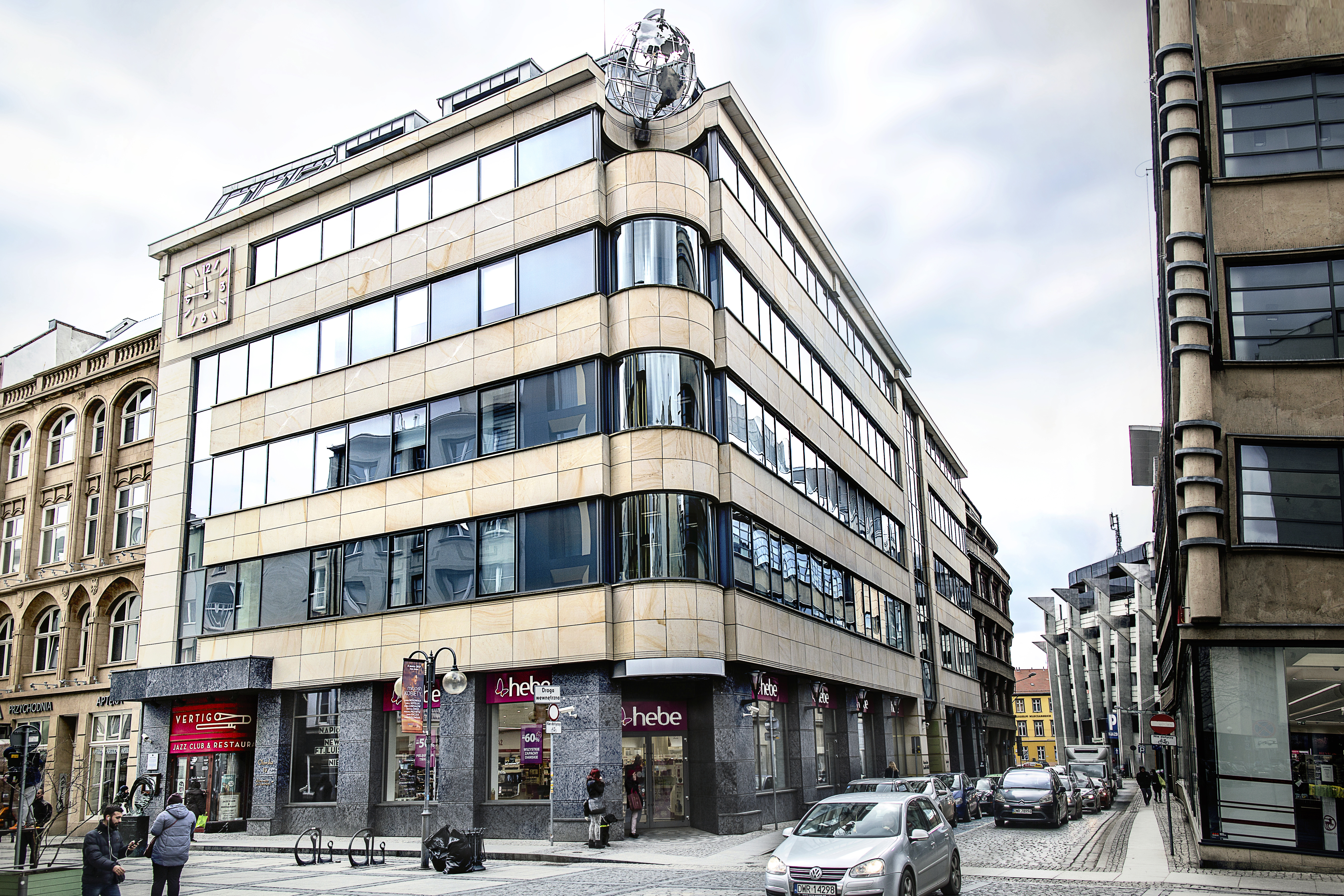
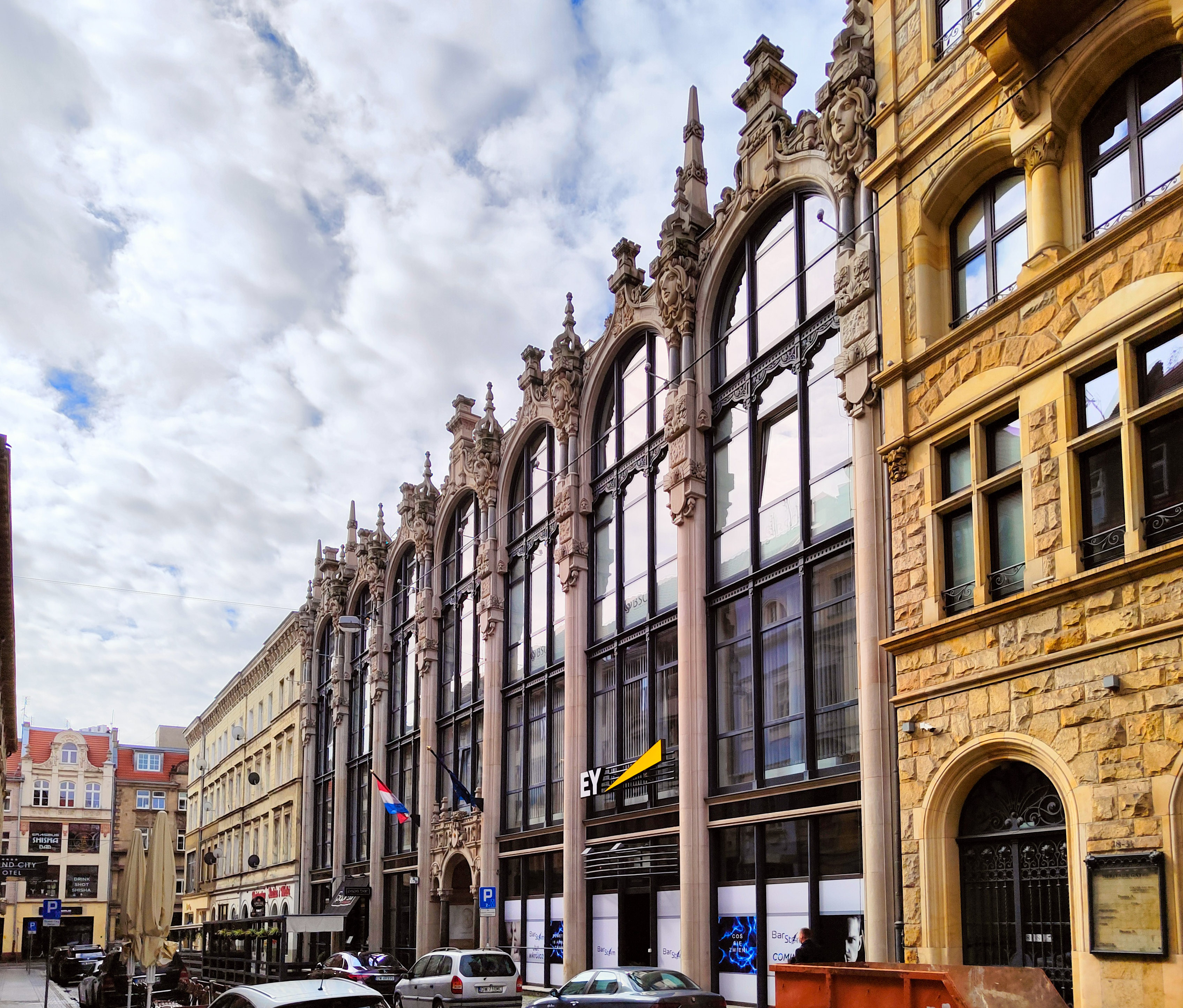
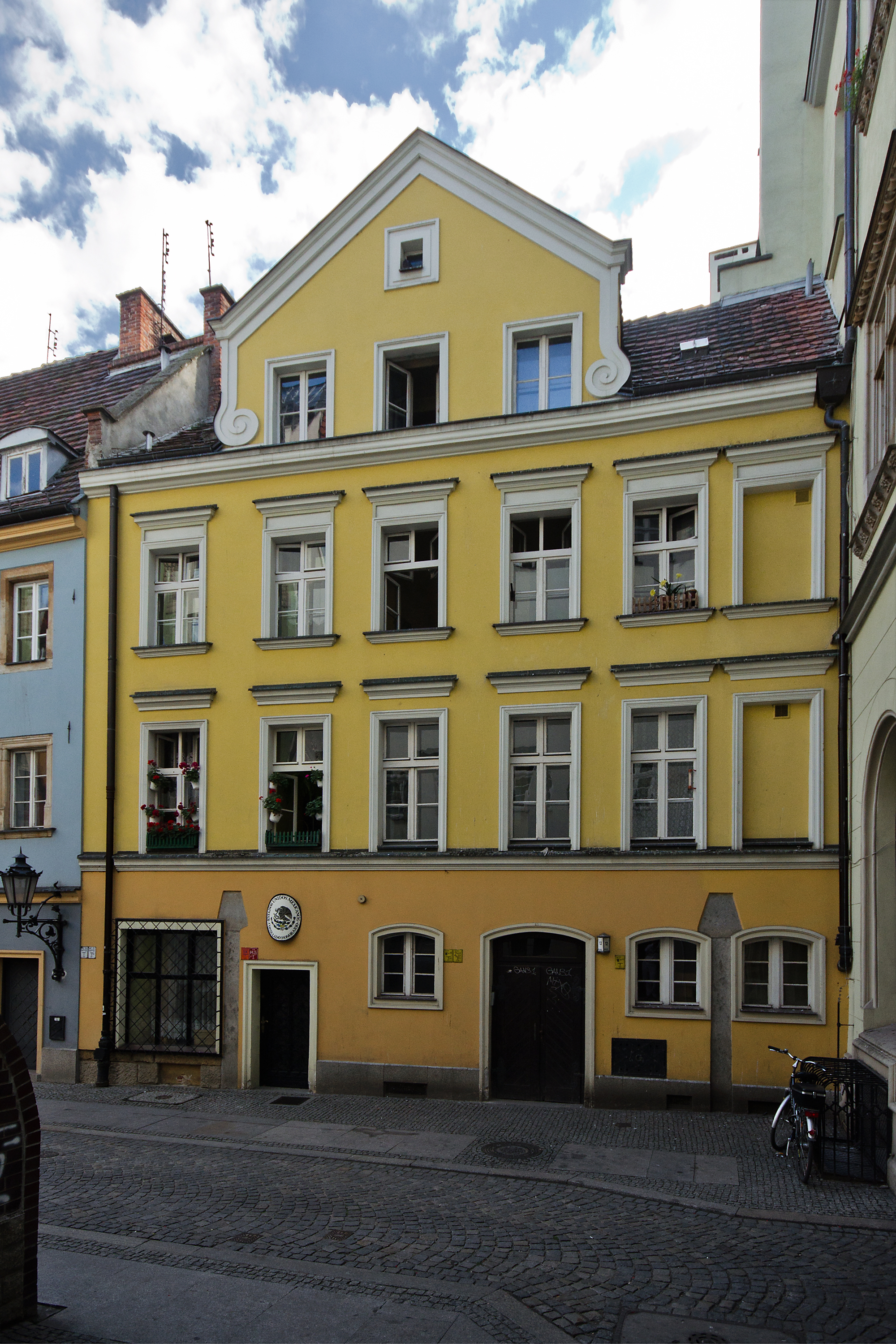
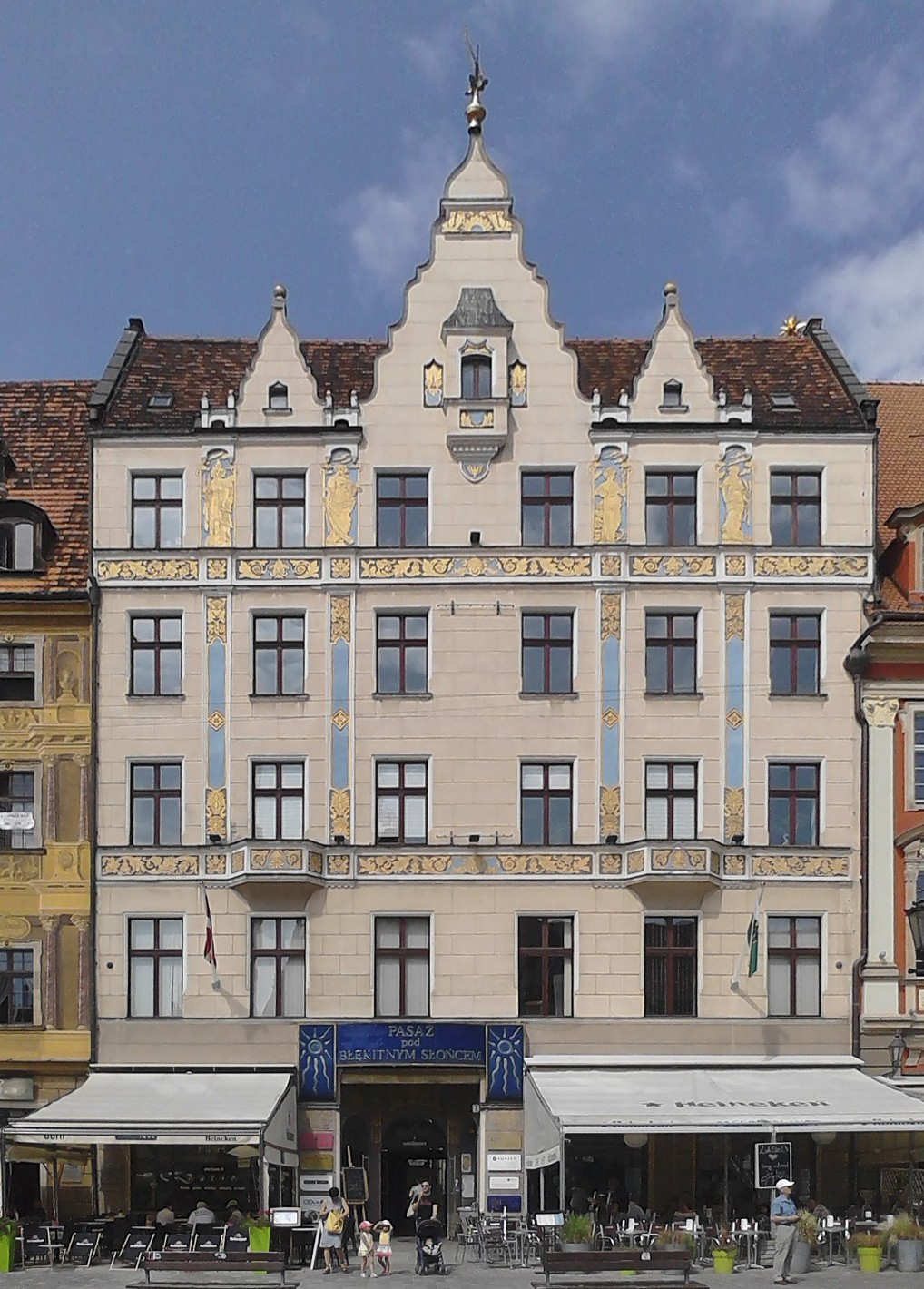
From top, left to right: Consulates general of Germany and Ukraine, Vice-Consulate of Hungary, honorary consulates of Luxembourg, Mexico and Norway

=== Diplomatic missions ===
There are 2 general consulates in Wrocław – Germany and Ukraine, a Vice-Consulate of Hungary, and 23 honorary consulates – Austria, Bulgaria, Chile, Czech Republic, Denmark, Estonia, Finland, France, Georgia, India, Italy, Kazakhstan, Latvia, Lithuania, Luxembourg, Malta, Mexico, Norway, Slovakia, Spain, Sweden, Turkey, United Kingdom.

=== Twin towns – sister cities ===
Wrocław is twinned with:

- (Georgia (country)) Batumi, Georgia (2019)
- Breda, Netherlands (1991)
- Charlotte, United States (1991)
- Cheongju, South Korea (2023)
- Dresden, Germany (1991)
- Guadalajara, Mexico (1995)
- Hradec Králové, Czech Republic (2003)
- Kaunas, Lithuania (2003)
- Lille, France (2013)
- Lviv, Ukraine (2002)
- Oxford, United Kingdom (2018)
- Ramat Gan, Israel (1997)
- Reykjavík, Iceland (2017)
- Seongnam, South Korea (2026)
- Vienne, France (1990)
- Wiesbaden, Germany (1987)

== Works ==
- Microcosm: Portrait of a Central European City, a 2002 book

== See also ==
- 2003 Wrocław football riot
- Jan (bishop of Wrocław)
- Wrocław Global Forum
- Breslau, Ontario – former village (settled 1806, postal village 1857) and now community named after Wrocław
- City Barrage, Wrocław

== Bibliography ==
- Davies, Norman; Roger Moorhouse (2002). Microcosm: Portrait of a Central European City. London: Jonathan Cape. ISBN 978-0-224-06243-5.
- Till van Rahden, Jews and Other Germans: Civil Society, Religious Diversity, and Urban Politics in Breslau, 1860–1925 (2008. Madison, WI: The University of Wisconsin Press
- Gregor Thum, Uprooted. How Breslau Became Wrocław During the Century of Expulsions (2011. Princeton: Princeton University Press
- Strauchold, Grzegorz; Eysymontt, Rafał (2016). Wrocław/Breslau. Historical-Topographical Atlas of Silesian Towns. Vol. 5. Translated by Connor, William. Marburg: Herder Institute for Historical Research on East Central Europe. ISBN 978-3-87969-411-2.
- Harasimowicz, Jan; Suleja, Włodzimierz (2006). Encyklopedia Wrocławia. Wrocław: Wydawnictwo Dolnośląskie. ISBN 978-83-7384-561-9.
- Kulak, Teresa (2006). Wrocław. Przewodnik historyczny (A to Polska właśnie). Wrocław: Wydawnictwo Dolnośląskie. ISBN 978-83-7384-472-8.
- Gregor Thum, Obce miasto: Wrocław 1945 i potem, Wrocław: Via Nova, 2006
- Scheuermann, Gerhard (1994). Das Breslau-Lexikon (2 vols.). Dülmen: Laumann n. BidVerlagsgesellschaft. ISBN 978-3-89960-132-9.
- van Rahden, Till (2000). Judenbiskupln nund andere Breslauer: Die Beziehungen zwischen Juden, Protestanten und Katholiken in einer deutschen Großstadt von 1860 bis 1925. Göttingen: Vandenhoeck & Ruprecht. ISBN 978-3-525-35732-3.
- Sochacka, Stanisława (2020). "Wrocław jako pra- i staropolska nazwa o archaicznej strukturze" [Wrocław as a Proto- and Old Polish Name with an Archaic Structure] (PDF). Studia Śląskie. 86–87.
- Thum, Gregor (2002). Die fremde Stadt: Breslau 1945. Berlin: Siedler. ISBN 978-3-88680-795-6.
- Weczerka, Hugo (2003). Handbuch der historischen Stätten: Schlesien. Stuttgart: Alfred Kröner Verlag. ISBN 978-3-520-31602-8.
- Wrocław w liczbach 2000 (PDF) (in Polish). Wrocław: Urząd Statystyczny we Wrocławiu. 1999. ISBN 83-911967-7-1. Archived (PDF) from the original on 29 August 2020 – via Śląska Biblioteka Cyfrowa.
