= Corpus Christi =

Corpus Christi (Latin for "body of Christ") may refer to:

== City in Texas ==
- Corpus Christi, Texas, US
  - Corpus Christi Bay
  - Corpus Christi Hooks, a minor league baseball team
  - Corpus Christi International Airport
  - Corpus Christi Independent School District
  - Naval Air Station Corpus Christi

== Churches ==
- Corpus Christi Catholic Church (Fort Dodge, Iowa), in Woodbury County, Iowa
- Corpus Christi R. C. Church Complex, in Erie County, New York
- Corpus Christi Church (New York City)
- Corpus Christi Cathedral (Corpus Christi, Texas)
- Corpus Christi Catholic Church (Celebration, Florida)
- Corpus Christi Catholic Church (Drumcondra, Dublin)
- Corpus Christi Catholic Church, Maiden Lane, Roman Catholic church in Covent Garden, London, England
- Corpus Christi Church, Brixton, Roman Catholic church in London, England
- Corpus Christi Basilica, Gothic Church in Krakow, Poland
- Corpus Christi Catholic Church, Wokingham, England

== Educational institutions ==
- Corpus Christi Catholic High School, Wollongong, New South Wales, Australia
- Corpus Christi College, Melbourne, Victoria, Australia
- Corpus Christi College, Perth, Western Australia
- Corpus Christi College (Vancouver), British Columbia
- Corpus Christi Catholic Secondary School, in Burlington, Ontario
- Pallikoodam or Corpus Christi High School, a school in Kottayam, Kerala, India
- Corpus Christi College, Cambridge
- Corpus Christi College, Oxford
- Corpus Christi Catholic College, Leeds, West Yorkshire, UK
- Corpus Christi Roman Catholic High School, Cardiff
- Texas A&M University–Corpus Christi

== Music ==
- Corpus Christi Records, a record label
- Corpus Christi (band), a Christian metal band from Cincinnati, Ohio
- Corpus Christi (Angkor Wat album) (1990)
- Corpus Christi (Syven album) (2012)
- "Corpus Christi Carol", a Middle English hymn or carol
- "Corpus Christi", a 2019 song by Kevin Abstract from Arizona Baby

== Ships ==
- USS Corpus Christi (PF-44), a Tacoma-class frigate that served in World War II
- USS City of Corpus Christi (SSN-705), a Los Angeles-class submarine

== Other uses ==
- The Feast of Corpus Christi, a Christian solemnity which honors the real presence of Christ in the Eucharist
- Corpus Christi (2014 film), a 2014 Venezuelan film
- Corpus Christi (2019 film), a 2019 Polish film
- Corpus Christi (play), 1996, by Terrence McNally
  - Corpus Christi: Playing with Redemption, a 2011 film about the staging of the play
  - Corpus Christi, a fictitious adaptation of the play, involved in the gay Jesus film hoax
- Among other names, the n-Town Plays have been named "the Play Called Corpus Christi"

== See also ==
- Corpus Christi Cathedral (disambiguation)
- Corpus Christi Church (disambiguation)
- Corpus Christi High School (disambiguation)
- Corpus Christi shooting (disambiguation)
- Corpus Domini (disambiguation)
