= Old Town, Wrocław =

Old Town Stare Miasto
- Part of Wrocław
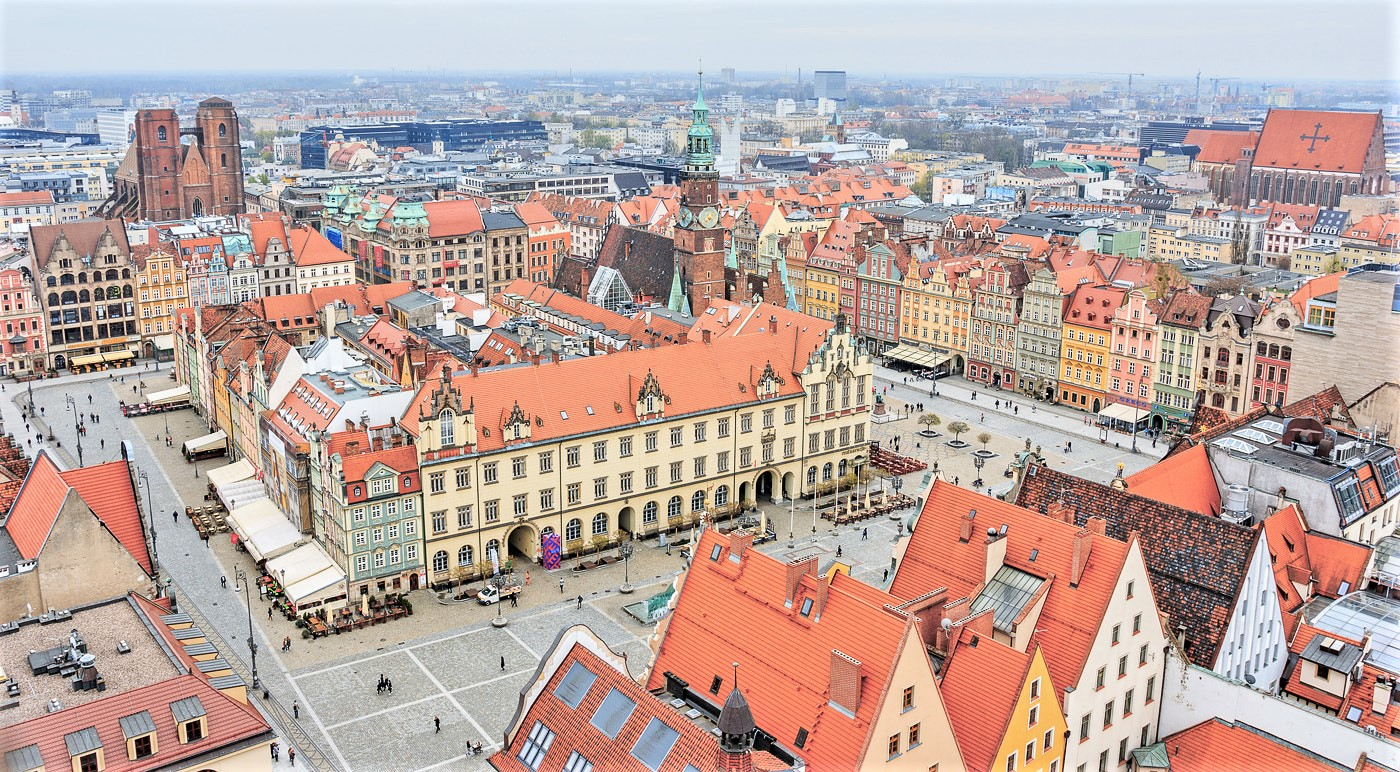
- Market Square

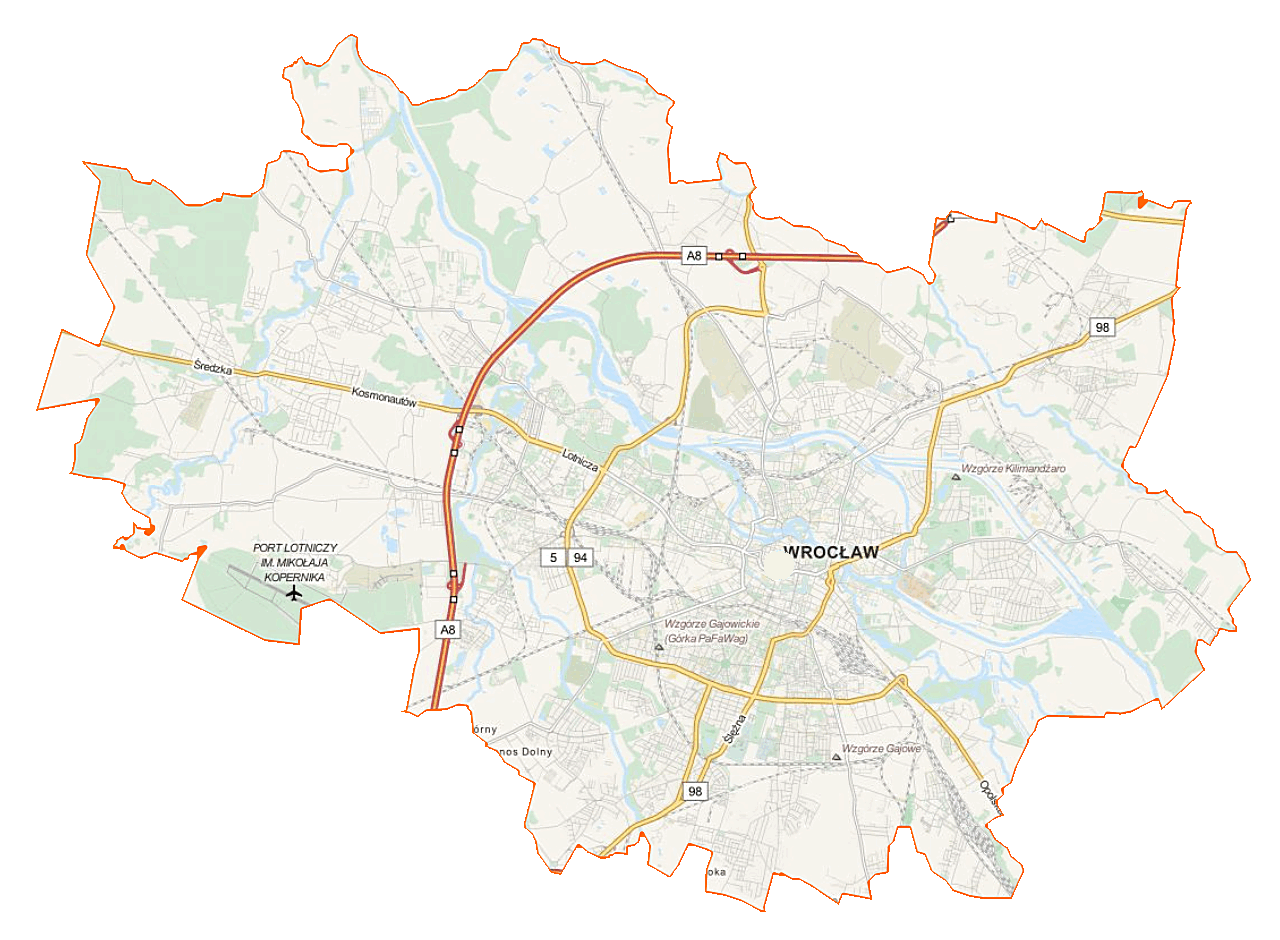
- Location within Wrocław Location within Poland
- Coordinates: 51.110°N 17.034°E
- Country: Poland
- Voivodeship: Lower Silesian
- County/City: Wrocław
- Time zone: UTC+1 (CET)
  - Summer (DST): UTC+2 (CEST)
- Vehicle registration: DW

Historic Monument of Poland
- Designated: 1994-09-08
- Part of: Wrocław – historic city center
- Reference no.: M.P. 1994 nr 50 poz. 425

The Old Town in Wrocław (Polish: Stare Miasto we Wrocławiu) is the oldest part of the south-bank Wrocław, originating from the thirteenth century. It is surrounded by the City Moat, a remnant of the complex system of fortifications, largely based on natural and artificial sections of the Oder River and the Oława River flowing into it. The green belt along the moat (and further along the Oder) is called the Old Town Promenade.

The center of the old city is the historic Market Square (Rynek), with numerous kamienice, the Old and New Town Hall (Ratusz). There is a number of historic landmarks in its vicinity, such as the Salt Market, St. Elizabeth of Hungary Church, St. Mary Magdalene Church, and numerous monuments. In the northern part of the old town can be found the main campus of the Wrocław University with the University Square, and on the opposite, southern side, lies the famous Quarter of the Four Denominations. The Church of Saints Hedwig and Clara next to Nankiera Square is the mausoleum of many rulers of Silesia, including Henry III, Henry V, Henry VI, and Anne of Bohemia.

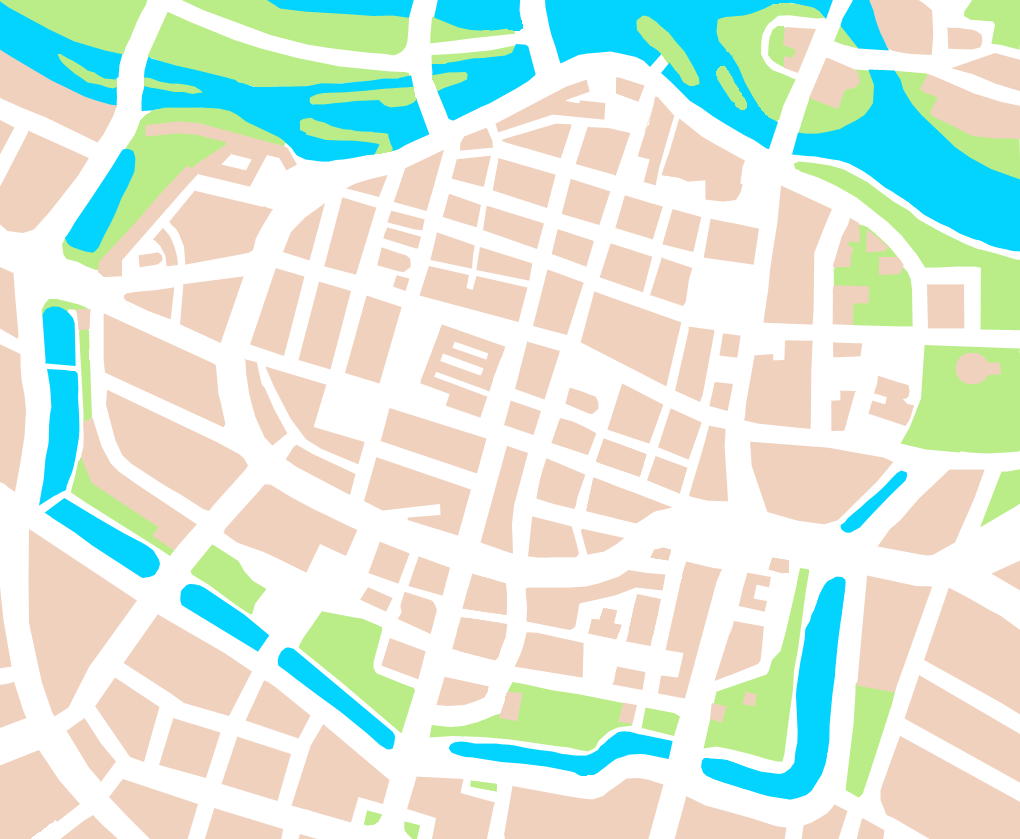
Map of the Old Town streets

The Old Town (Stare Miasto) is one of Poland's official national Historic Monuments (Pomnik historii), as designated September 16, 1994 in the first round. Its listing is maintained by the National Heritage Board of Poland. The Old Town is part of the city's administrative district which is also named "Stare Miasto," although it covers a wider area than the Old Town itself.

== History ==
The oldest part of Wrocław is Ostrów Tumski, which has been inhabited at least since the 9th century (nowadays it is part of the Śródmieście district), and the accompanying estates on the right and left bank of the Oder River were soon established. Already in the 12th century, there was a market square on the left bank of the river (in the area of today's Market Hall and Nankier Square). The areas north of today's Nankier Square and Uniwersytecka Street belonged to the prince's domain and were not part of the later founding city. The Piast dukes settled Jews there, founded monasteries, and had their own manors.

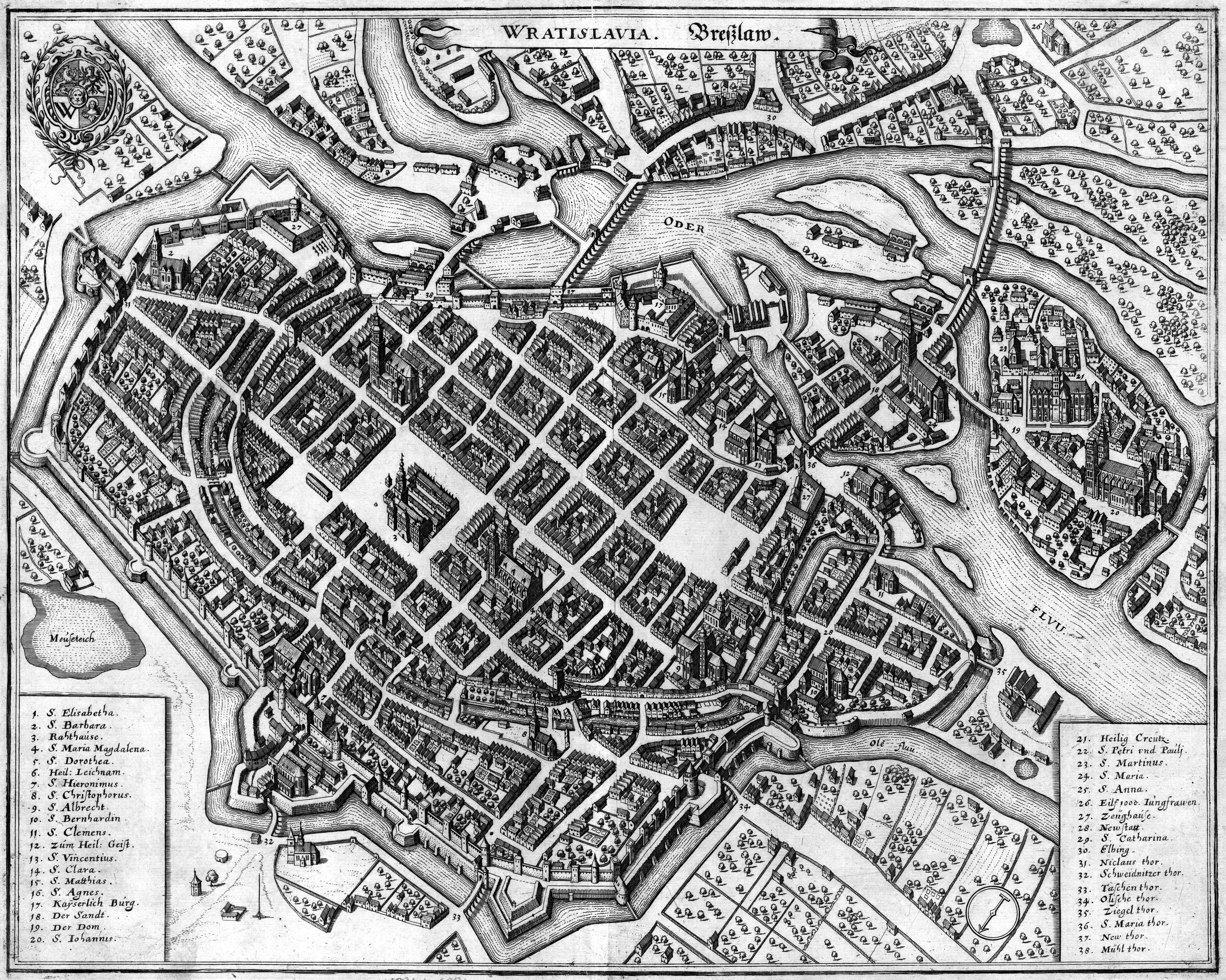
Breslau in 1660

In the 13th century, the town was under Magdeburg Law, and there are conflicting opinions of scientists about the order of spatial development of the town. Scarce information is provided by various records of foundations, consecrations of parish churches (St. Adalbert, St. Andrew, and St. Lawrence), as well as archaeological excavations. The first locations were made during the reign of Henry the Bearded, probably after 1212. Two settlements established on the orthogonal geometrical grid were created in this way: those called Skultetas in 1214 and Civitas Wratislaviensis (the City of Wroclaw) in 1226, and the Novum Forum (New Market) existing since around 1230. Probably the former occupied the area in the area of Piaskowa, St. Catherine, Wit Stwosz, and Latin streets (and thus around today's Nowy Targ), while the latter (despite the coincidence of names) was around the square known today as Rynek. The jurisdictional boundaries of the settlements were most probably determined by today's Szewska Street. Another hypothesis says that with the establishment of today's Market Square, the city was delimited within the Fosa River, which still exists today, and later it was temporarily reduced.

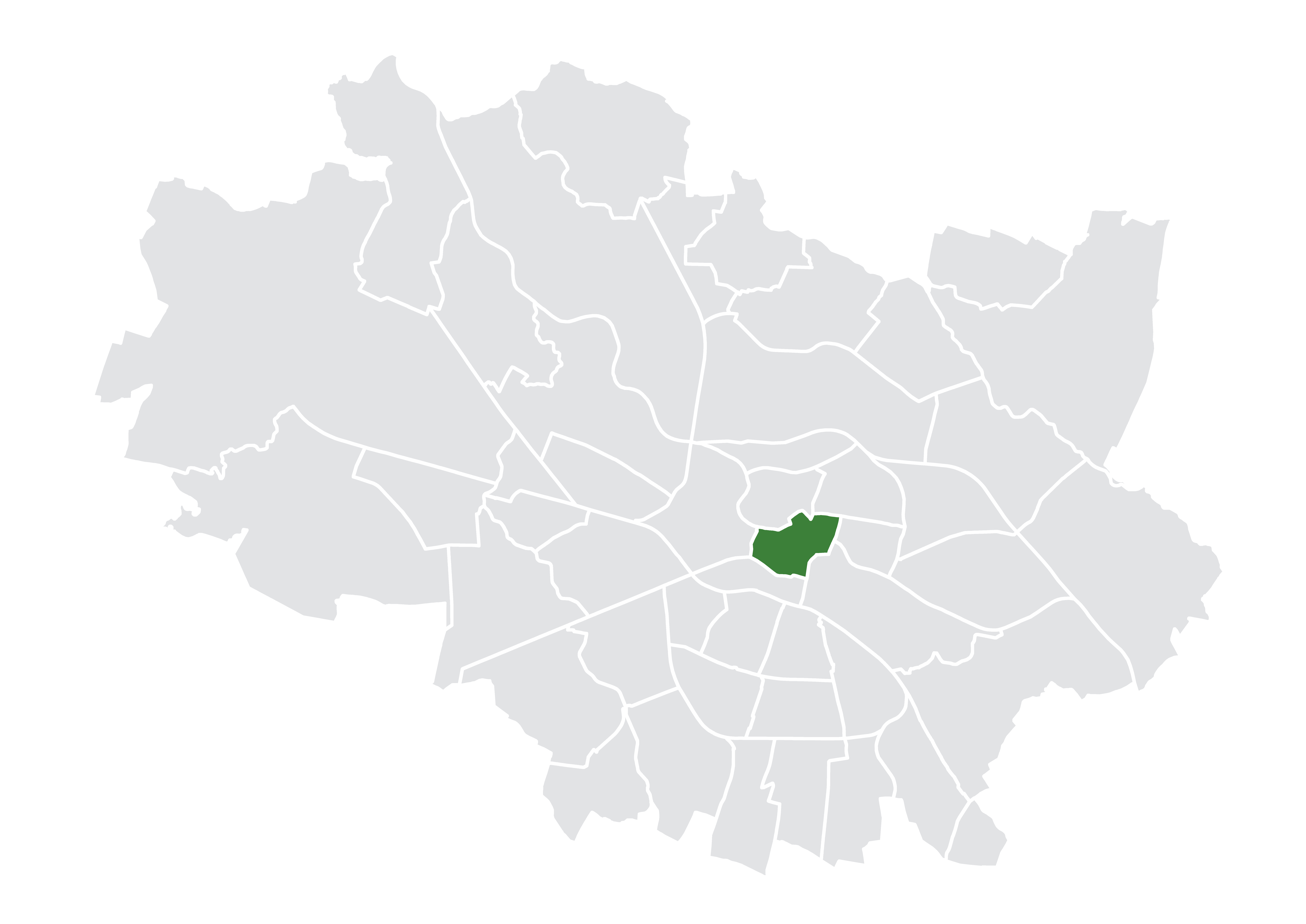
Old Town Osiedle

During the Mongolian invasion in 1241, the settlements were destroyed and rebuilt by re-location, joining them into one city and surrounding a defensive perimeter running in the line of today's Trasa W-Z. Probably the connection of the previously delimited towns caused a disturbance of the geometric grid between the Market Square and Nowy Targ. Already in 1261, the city was expanded to a new, external Fosa, and in 1263 an independent New City (Nowe Miasto) was established, incorporated into the main city in 1327.

Small extensions of the city area took place when the fortifications were extended. It was only in connection with the decision to demolish them in 1808 that Wrocław was extended beyond the Old and New Town.

During World War II, the Old and New Town was severely damaged. During the reconstruction, the emphasis was placed, for ideological reasons, on the preservation of objects from the Gothic era, i.e. from the times of the Piast rule. Many more damaged but newer buildings were demolished in order to obtain bricks. Apart from the Gothic churches, the reconstruction was first focused on the area of the Market Square, aiming to restore the state from the early 19th century.

Nowadays, both former towns have the status of the Old Town Osiedle, which also includes Ostrów Tumski and the complex of eastern Oder islands.

== Important sites ==
=== Museums and theatres ===
Many renowned points of interest in the Old Town include numerous art galleries as well as departments of the City Museum such as the Royal Palace, the Old Town Hall, Henryk Tomaszewski Theatre Museum, as well as the Archaeological Museum in the Arsenal.

There are also: the Pharmacy Museum, Museum of Pan Tadeusz, Lubomirski Museum and Ossolineum, Museum of Architecture, and Museum of the University of Wrocław. Two major theatres are also located there: the Wrocław Puppet Theater, and the most famous Wrocław Opera.

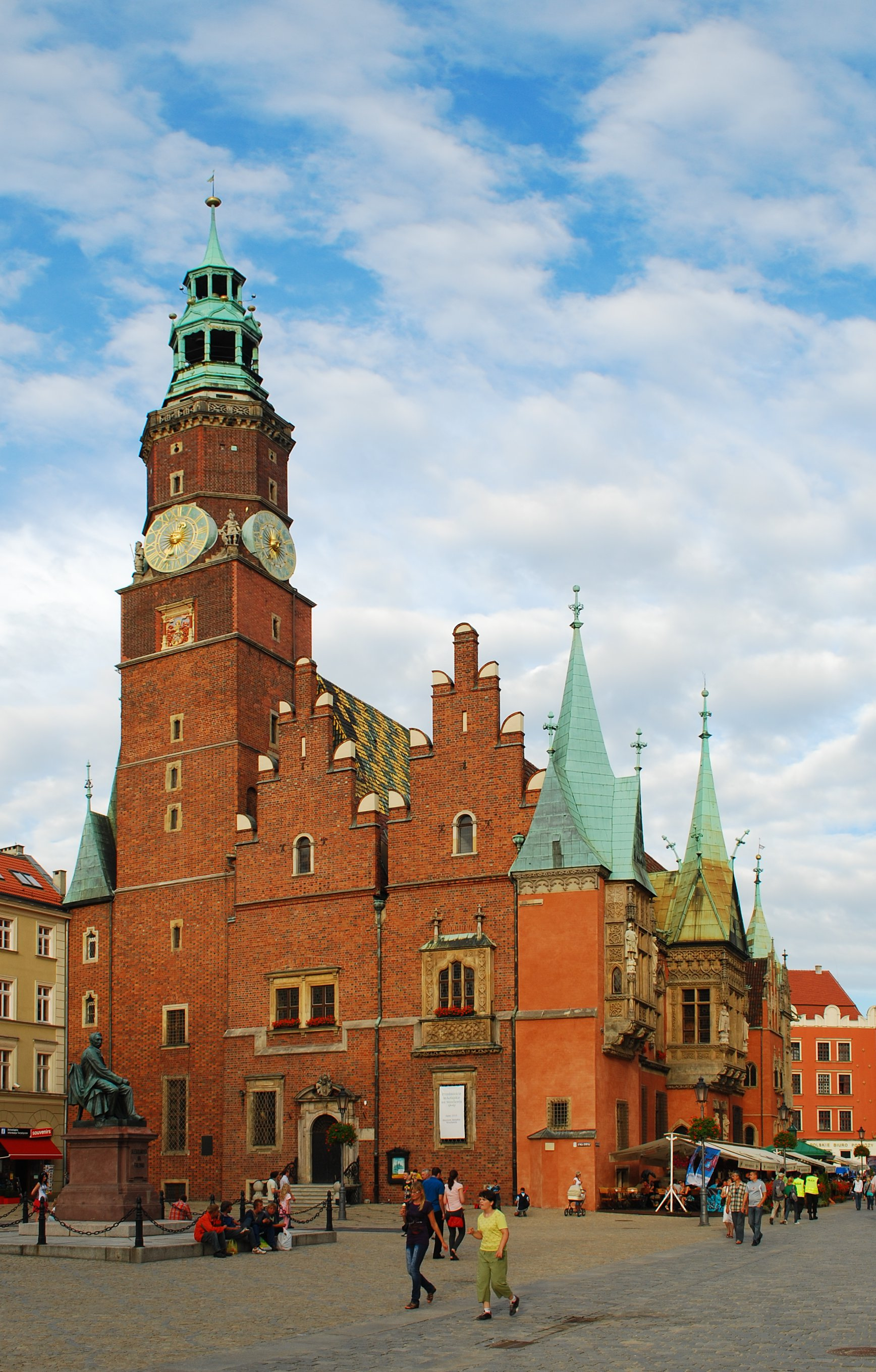
Wrocław Town Hall

=== Churches ===
- parish churches and auxiliary city churches:
  - St. Adalbert (until 1226), later Dominican monastery
  - St. Mary Magdalene, formerly St. Andrew, parish church, after 1526 Protestant, now a Polish Catholic cathedral, burial site of Henry II
  - St. Elizabeth, formerly St. Lawrence, parish, after 1526 Protestant, now Catholic again
  - St. Barbara, after 1526 Protestant, since 1963 Orthodox Cathedral
  - St. Christopher's Church, after 1526 and now Protestant
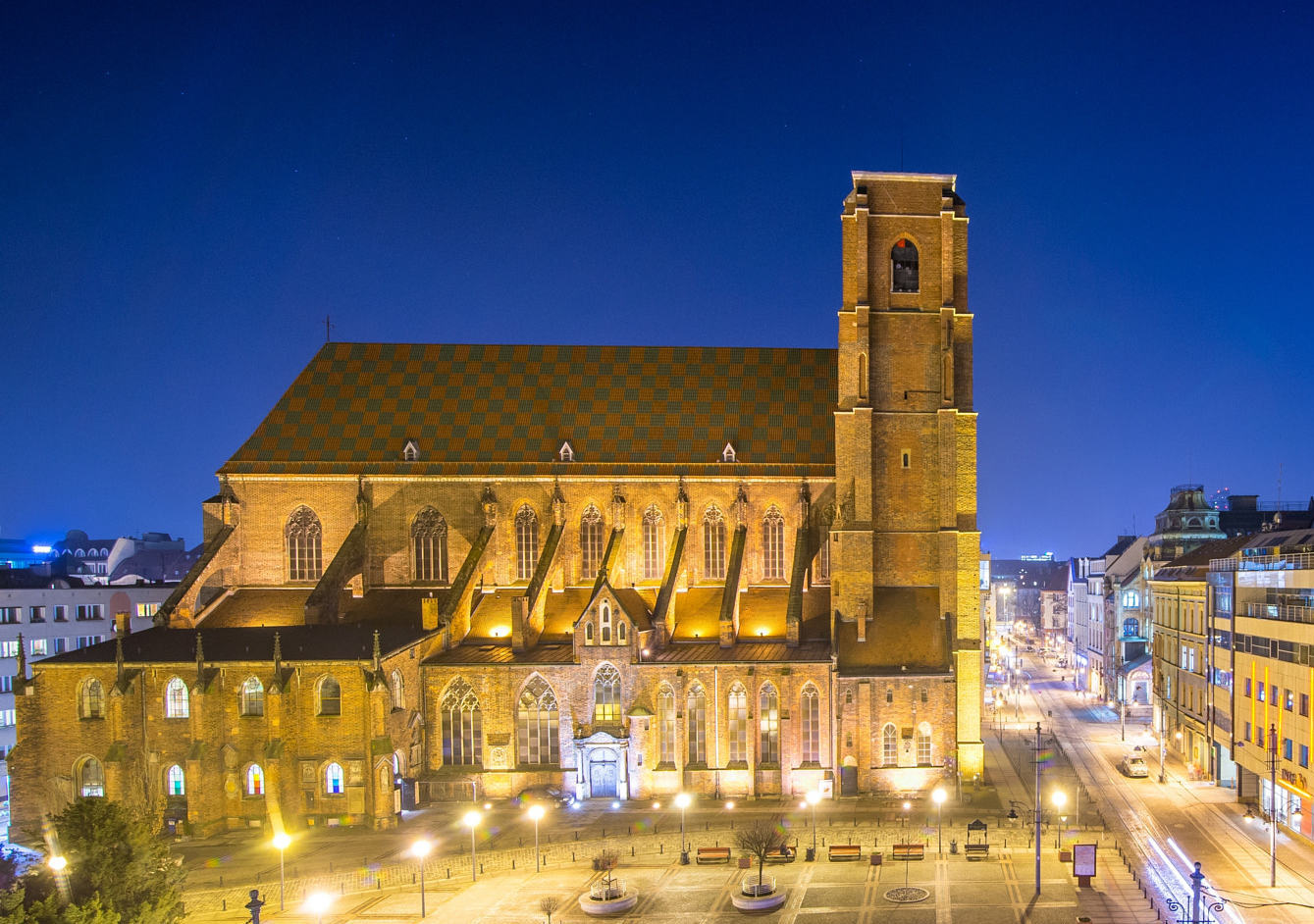
St Mary Magdalene Church

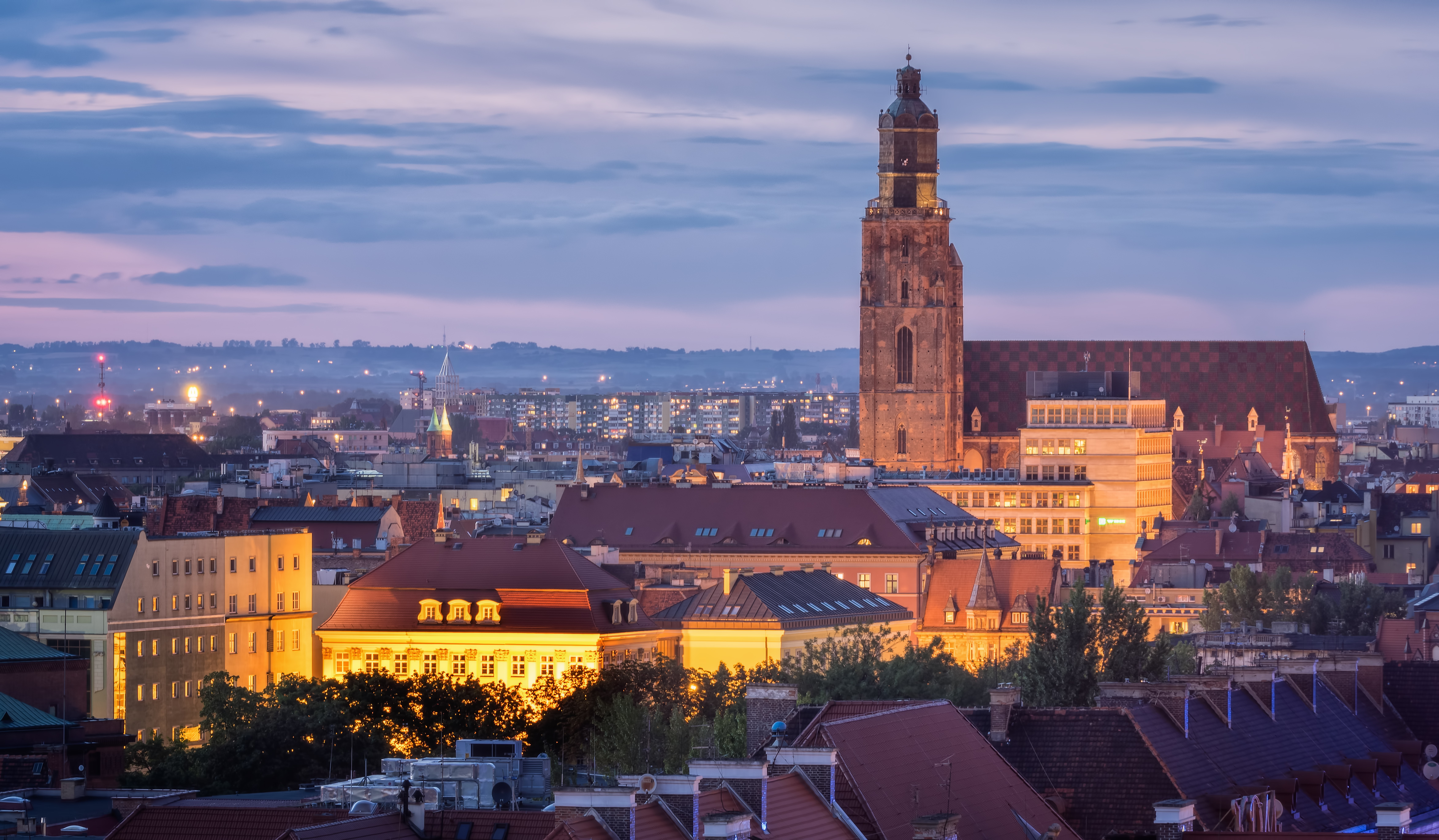
St Elizabeth's Church

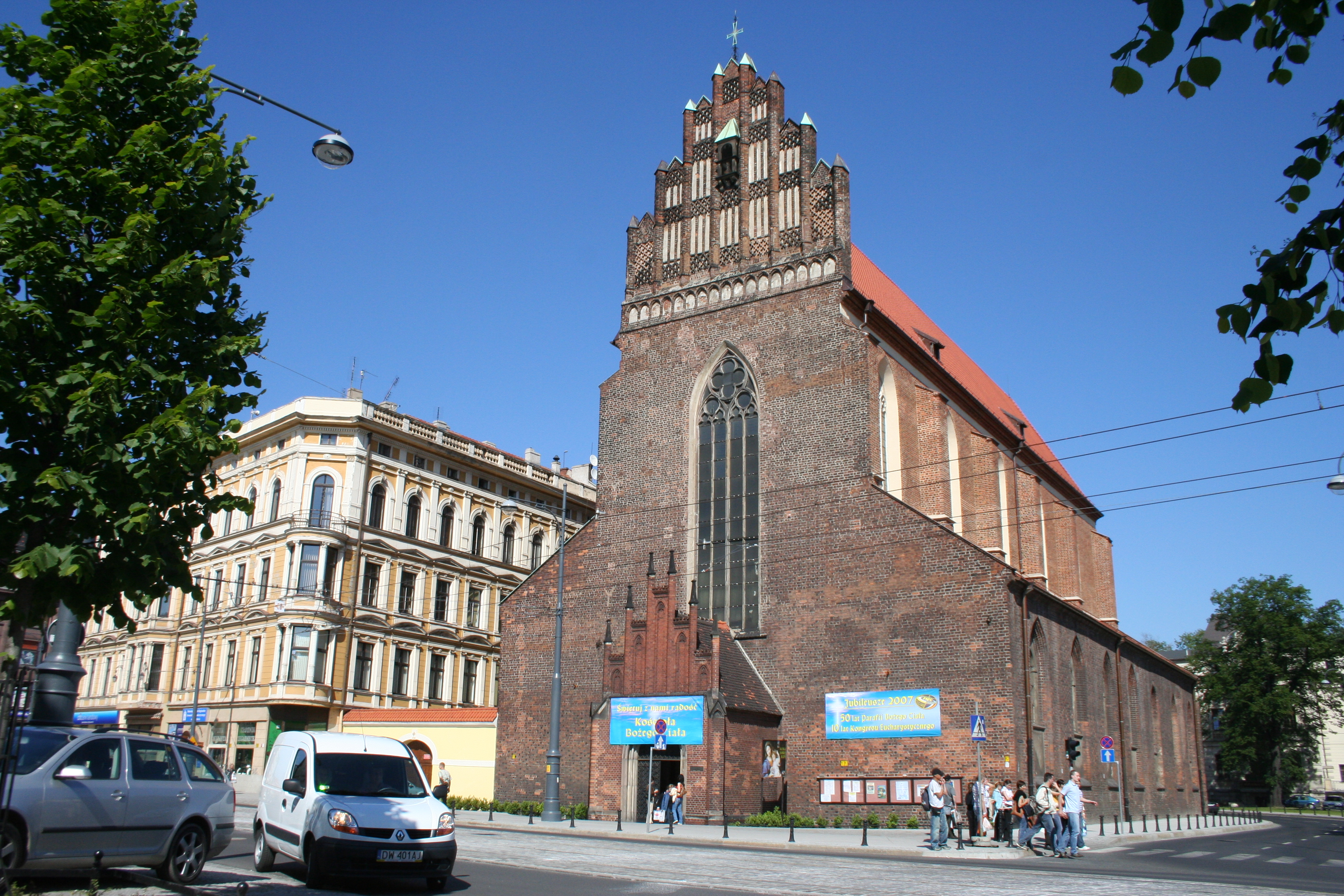
Corpus Christi Church

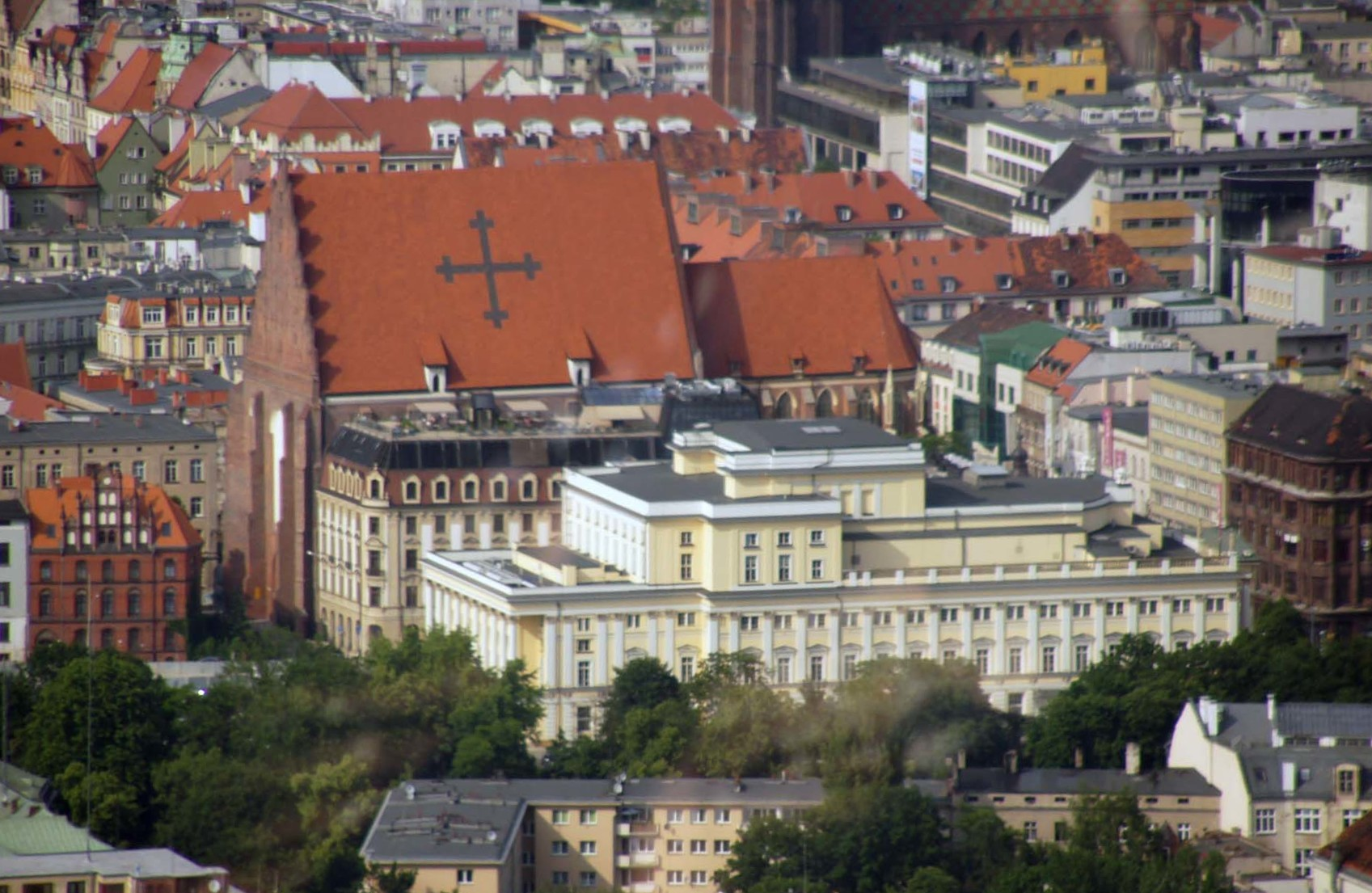
St Dorothea Church
- monastic complexes
  - Cathedral of St. Vincent and St. James (Nankier Square), the Franciscans, later the Norbertans, now a Greek-Catholic cathedral
  - Church of St. Clare and St. Hedwig (Nankiera Square), Poor Clares, later Ursuline
  - St. Maciej Church (pl. Nankiera/Szewska), Hospitallers
  - St. Agnes Church (Szewska), Hospitallers, destroyed
  - Corpus Christi church (Świdnicka Street), St. John's Church
  - Church of St. Stanislaus, St. Dorothea and St. Wenceslas (Świdnicka Street), Augustinian hermits, later Franciscans
  - Church of St. Anthony (St. Anthony Street), Franciscans, then Elizabethans and then Salesians
  - Church of the Name of Jesus (Uniwersytecki Square), Jesuits
  - St. Catherine's Church (St. Catherine's Street), Dominican
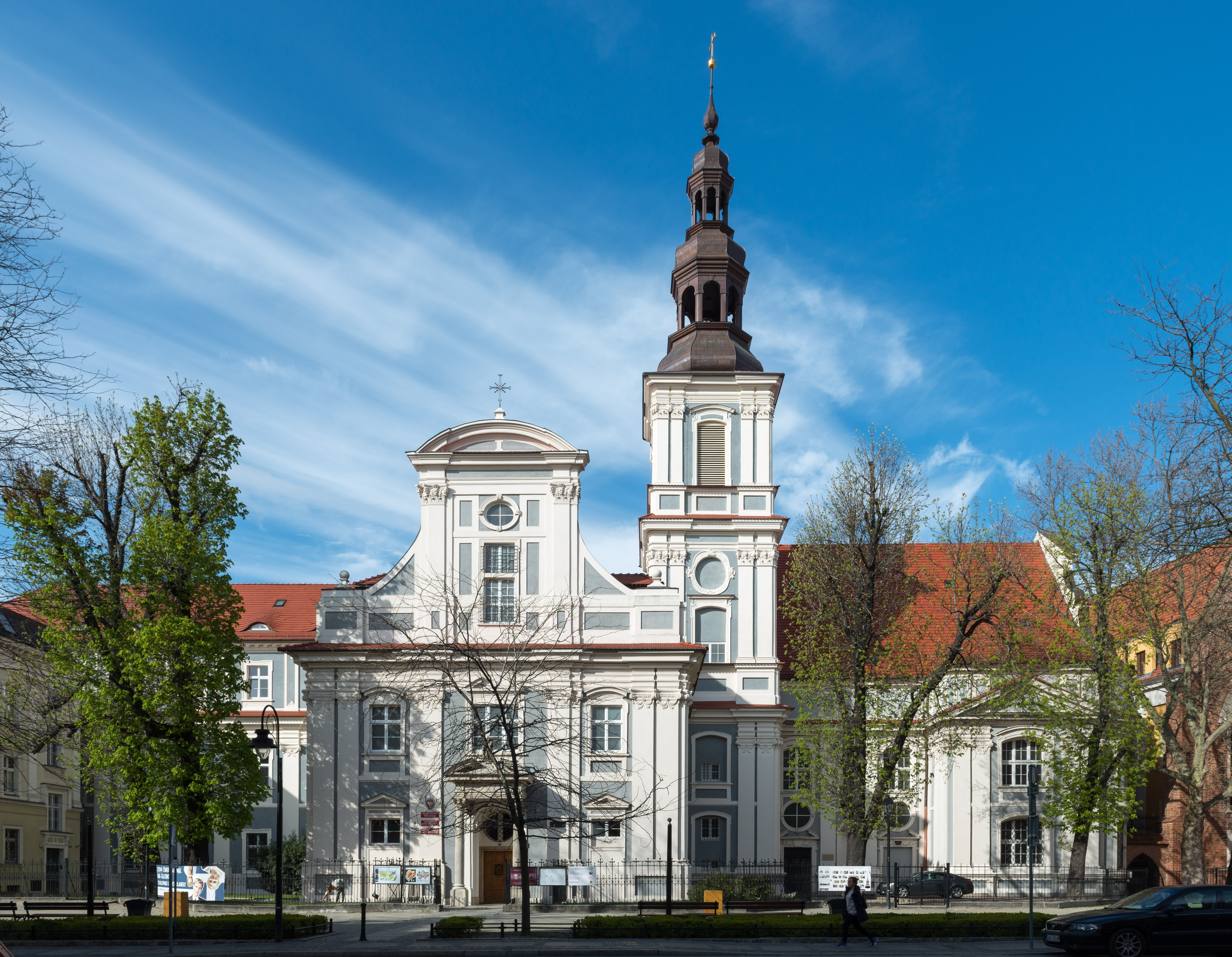
Saints Hedwig and Clare Church

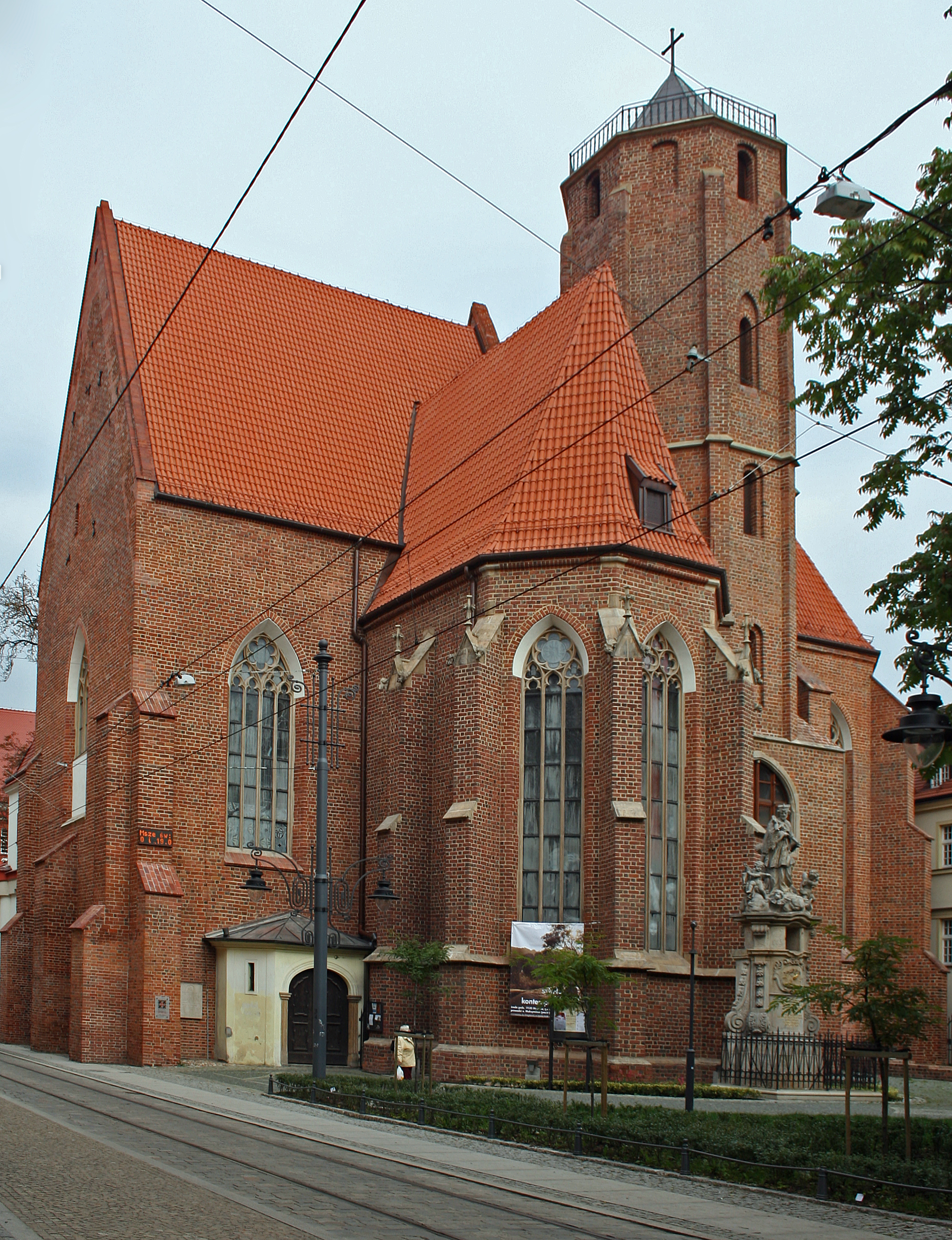
Saint Maciej Church

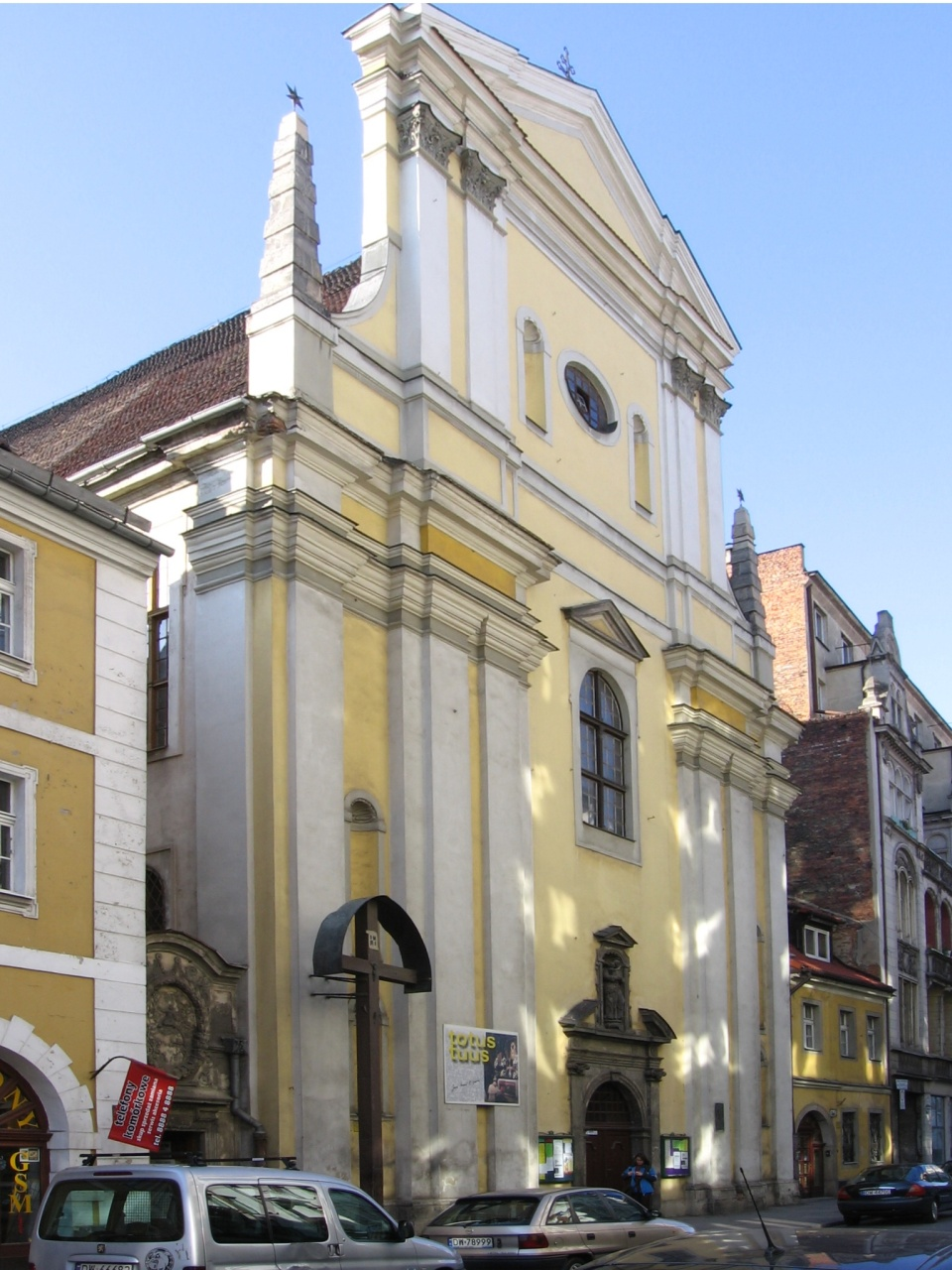
Saint Anthony of Padua Church

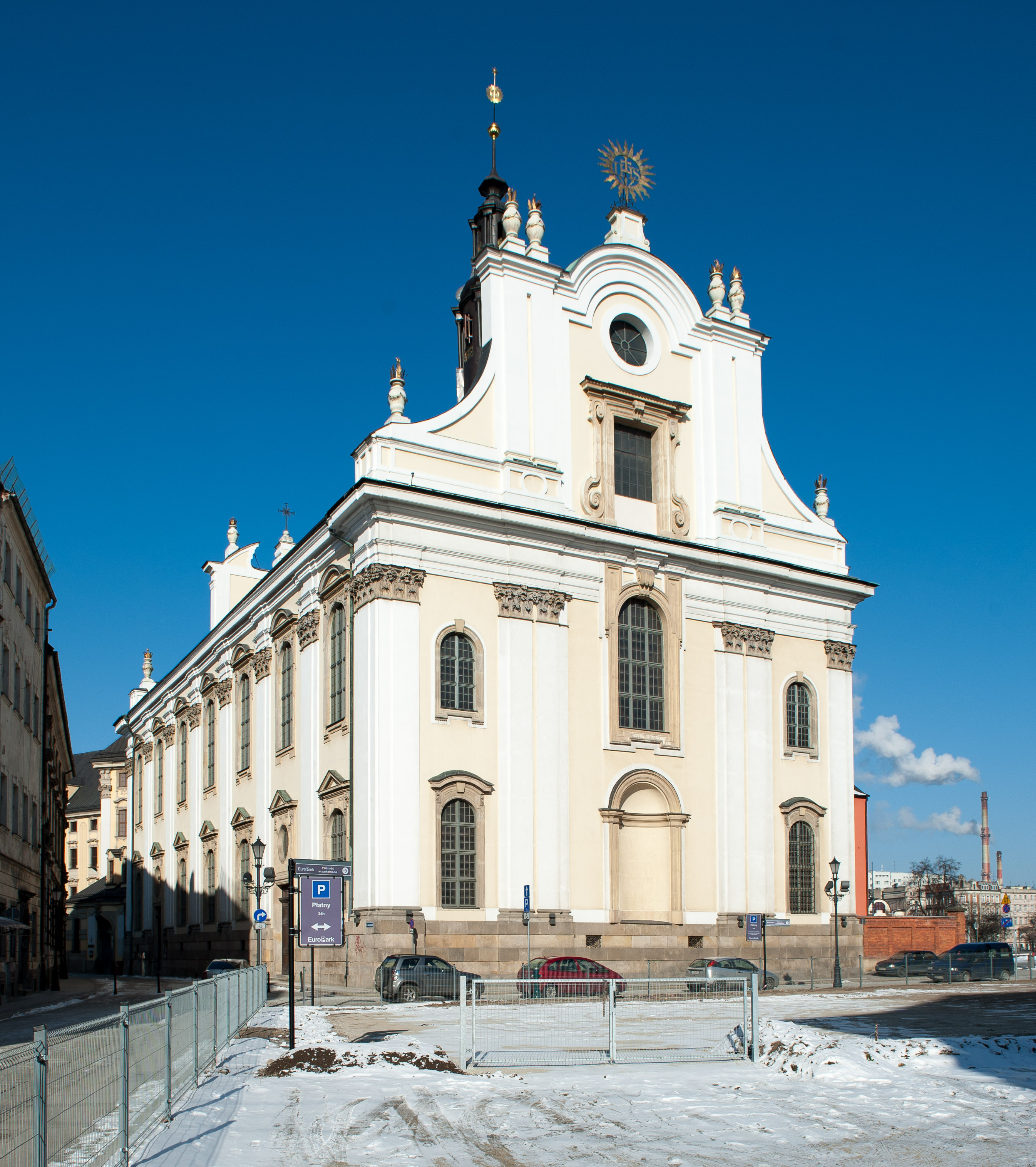
University Church of the Blessed Name of Jesus

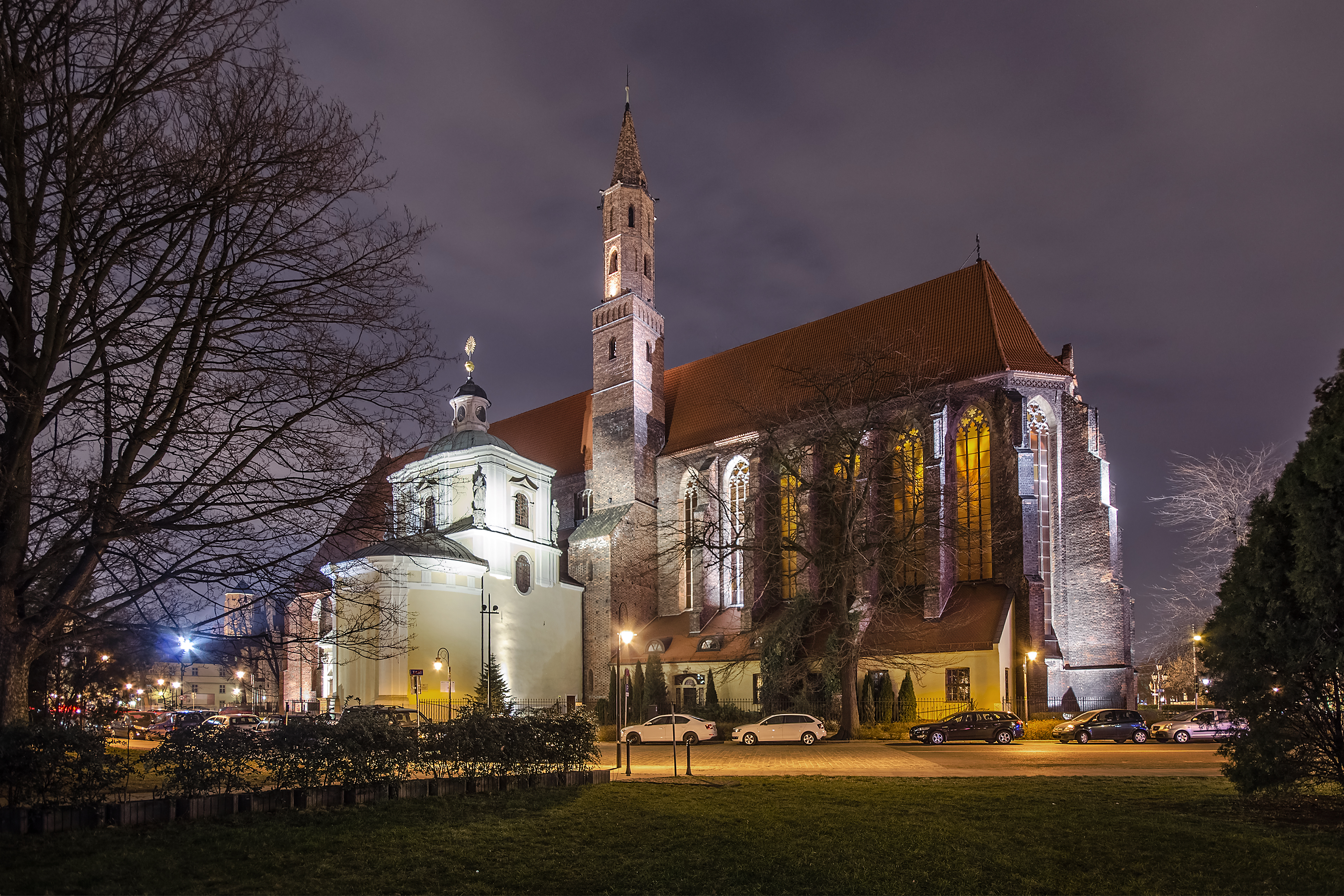
Saint Vincent Church

=== Other sites ===
- residences
  - imperial castle, demolished
  - royal palace
- White Stork Synagogue
- Wrocław Opera
- University with the Old Library
- Wrocław Market Hall
- Barasch Brothers' Department Store
- Świdnicka Cellar
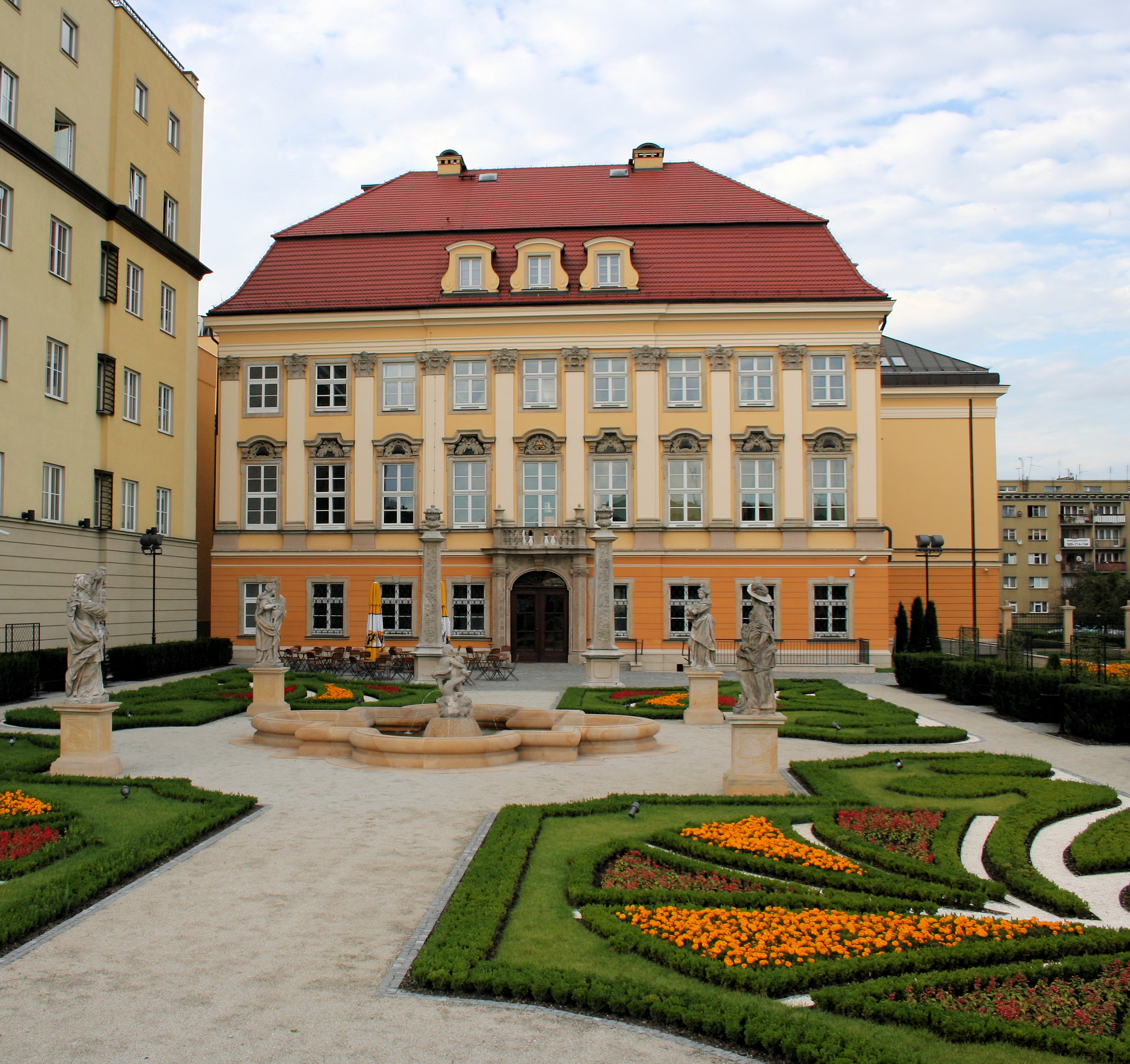
Royal Palace, Wrocław

White Stork Synagogue

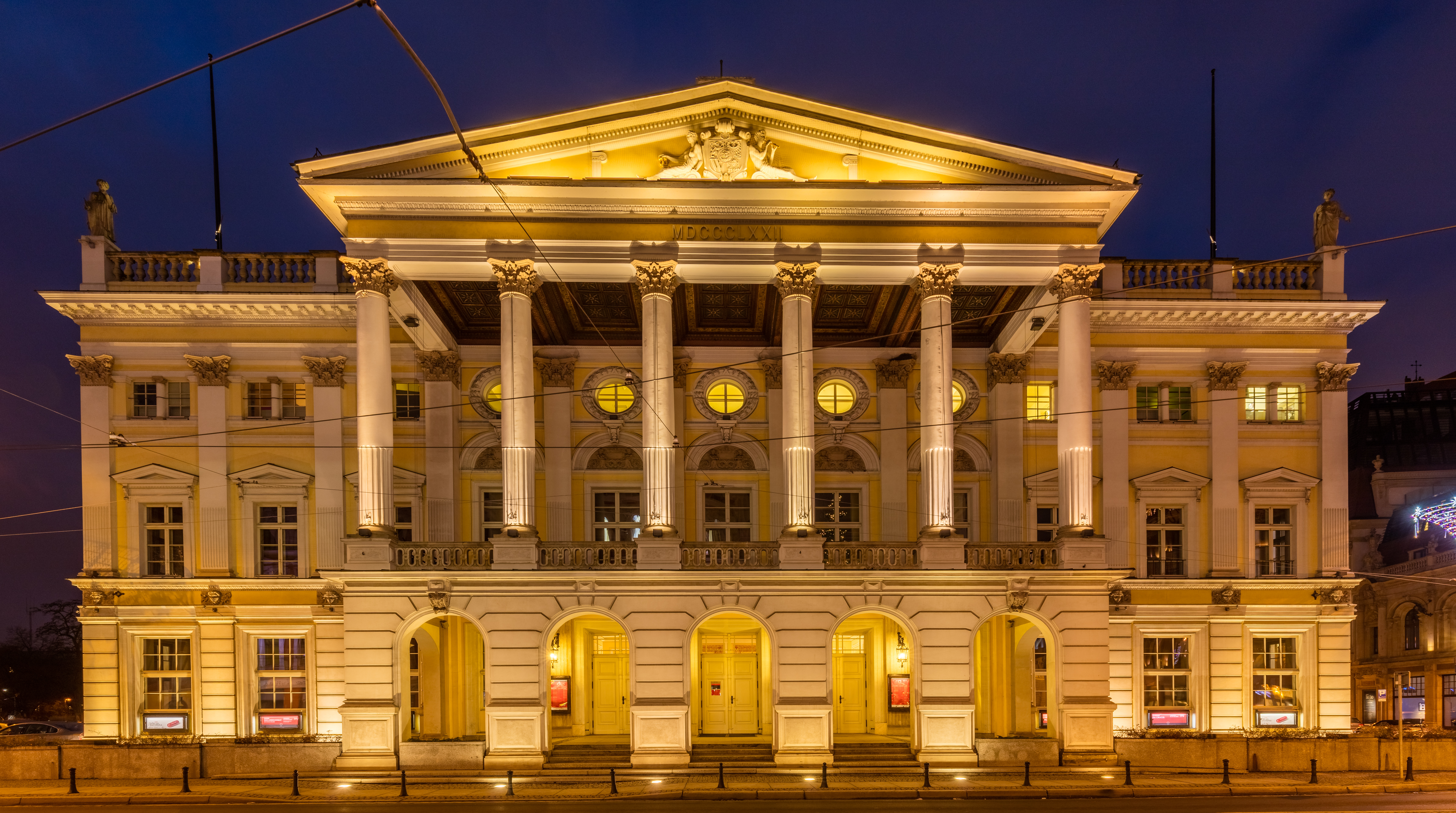
Wrocław Opera

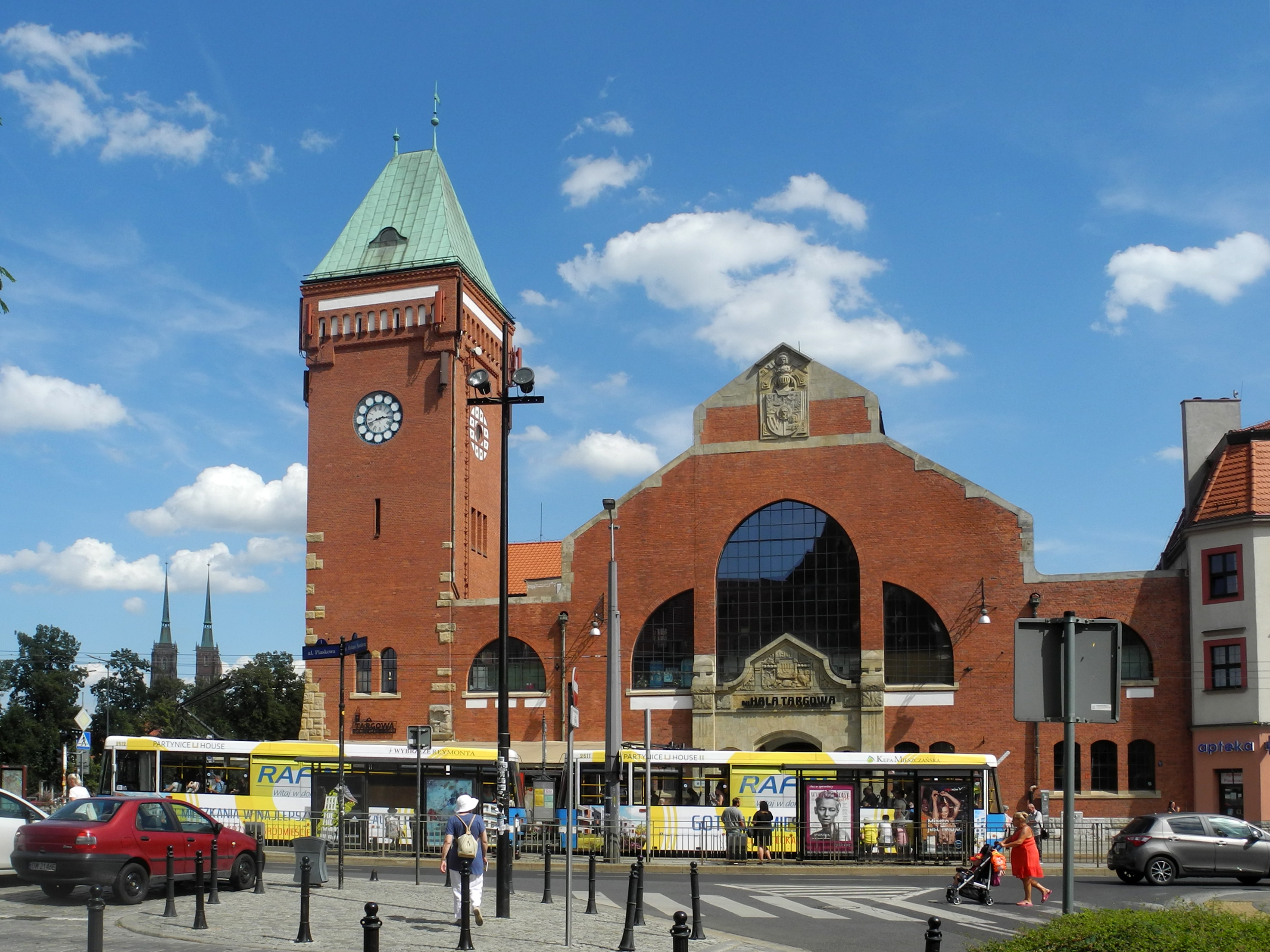
Wrocław Market Hall

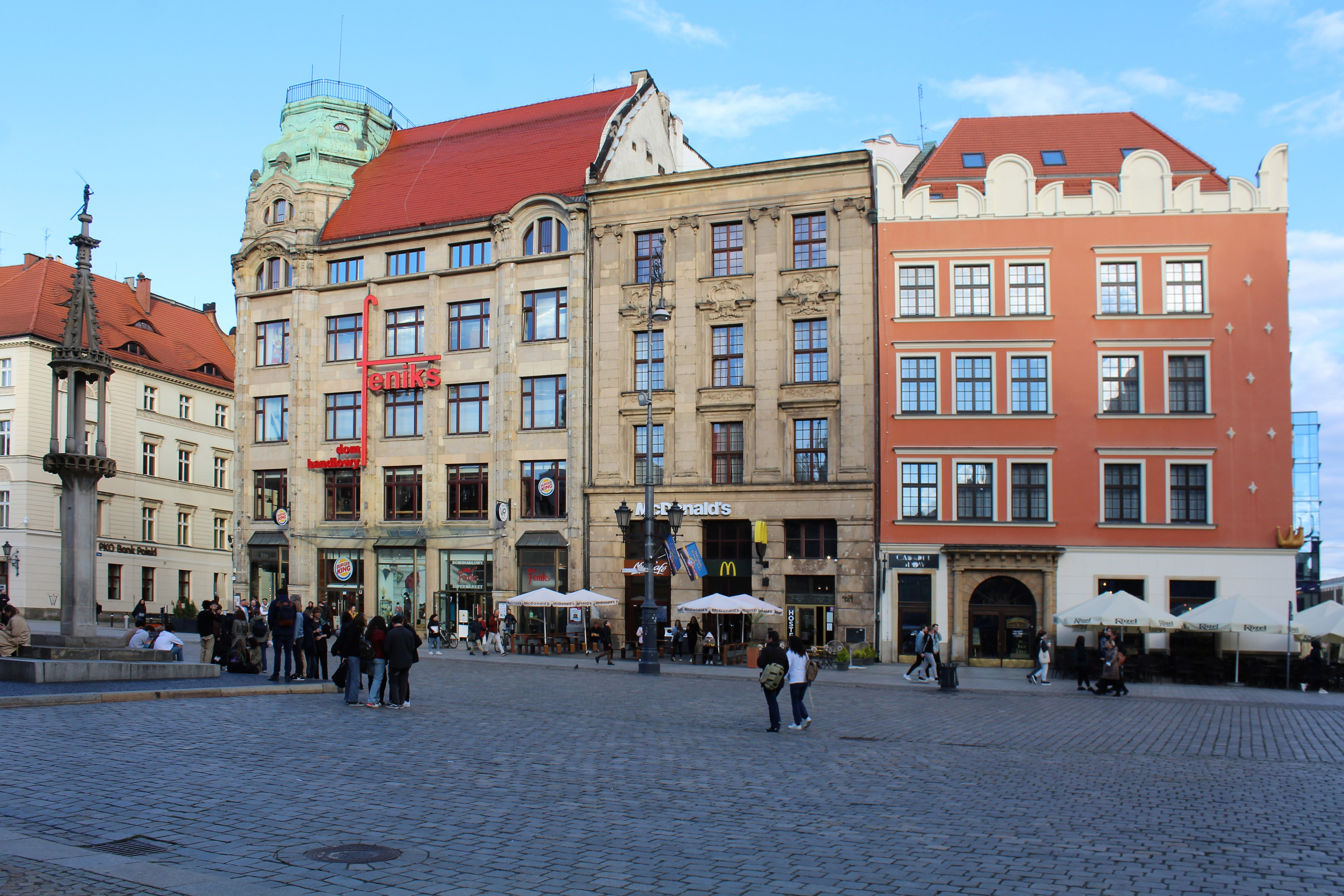
Barasch Brothers' Department Store (first on the left)

=== Monuments ===
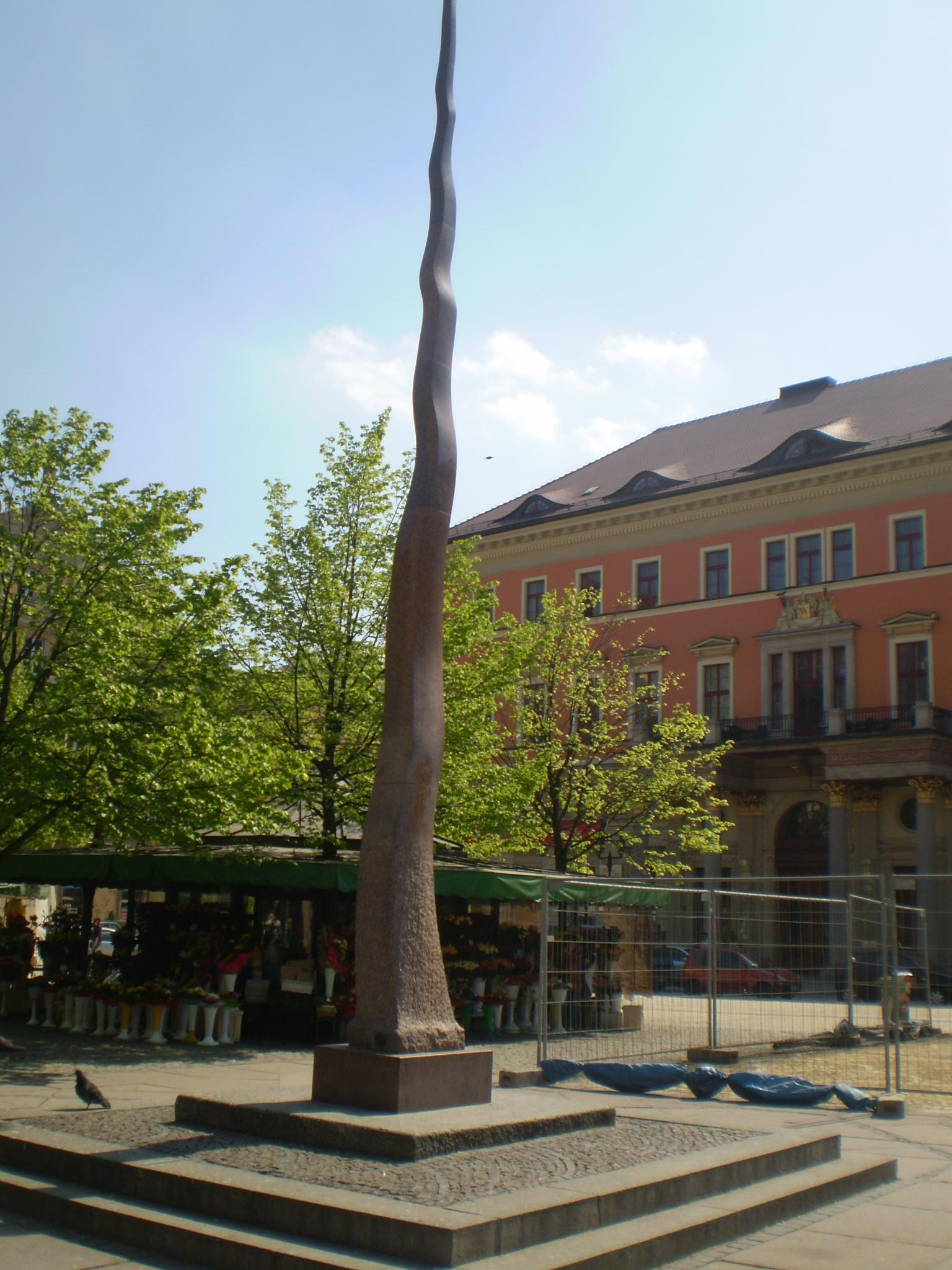
Mała Iglica, commemorating repressed Jewish population

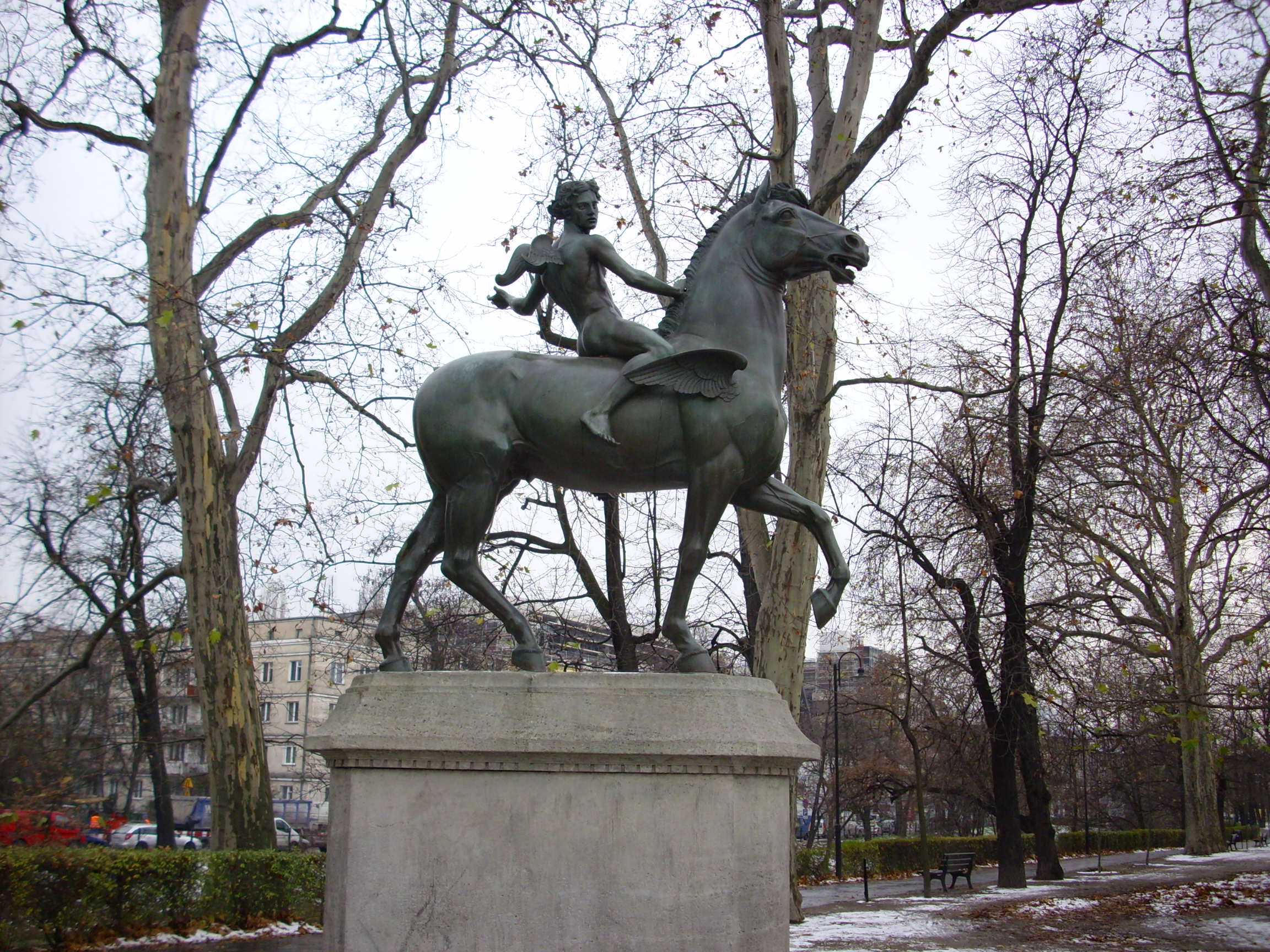
Cupid on the Pegasus sculpture

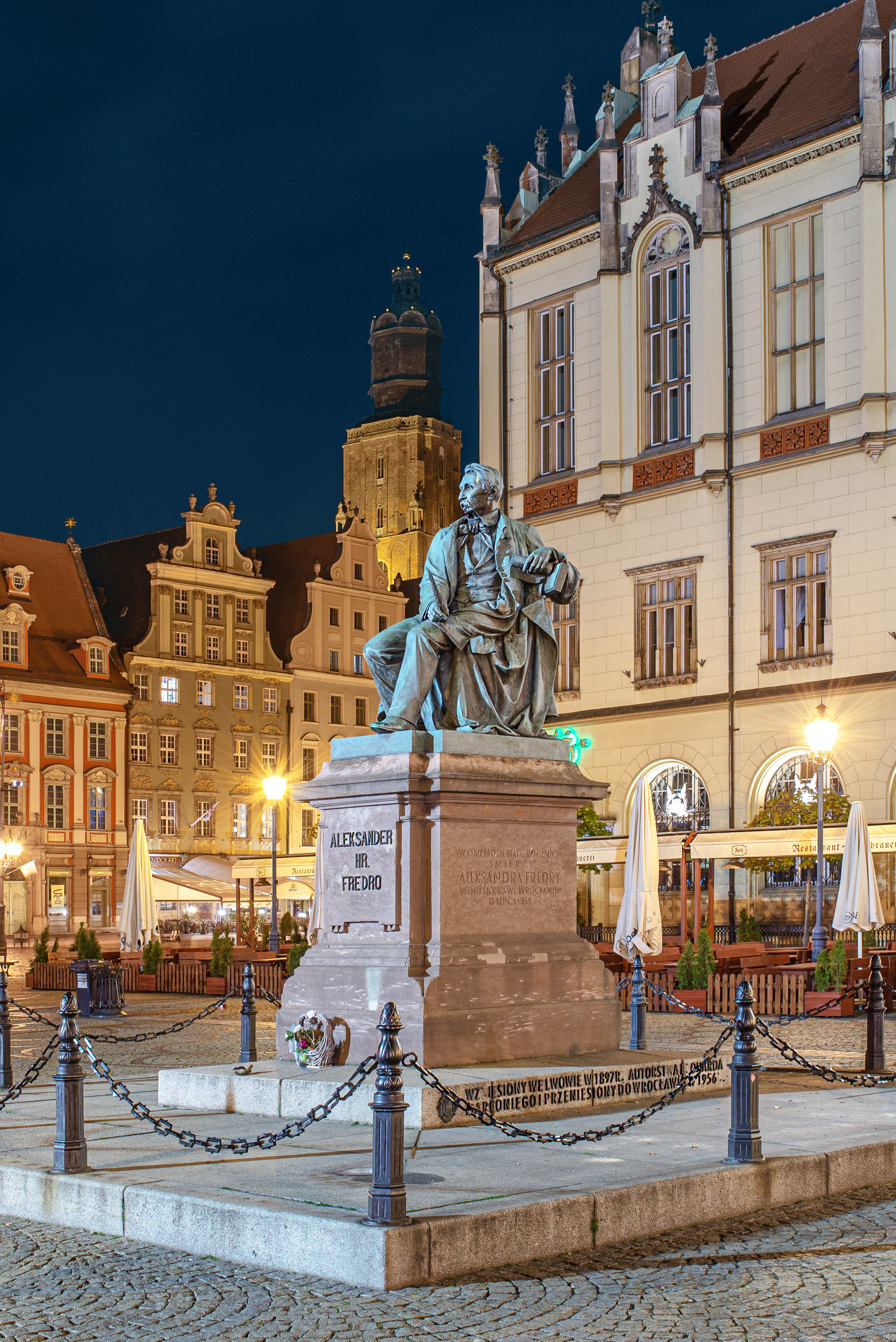
Aleksander Fredro Monument

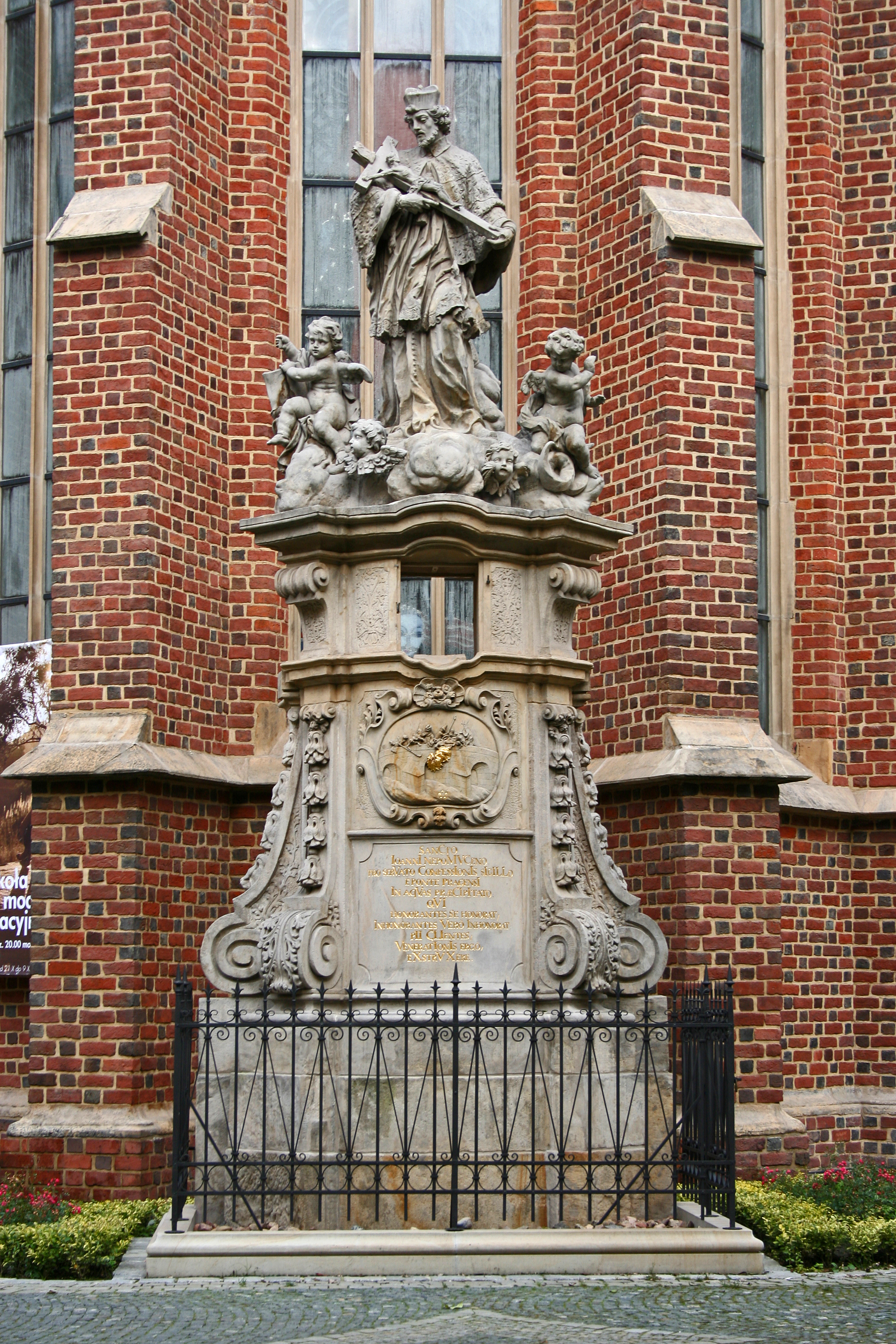
Statue of John of Nepomuk

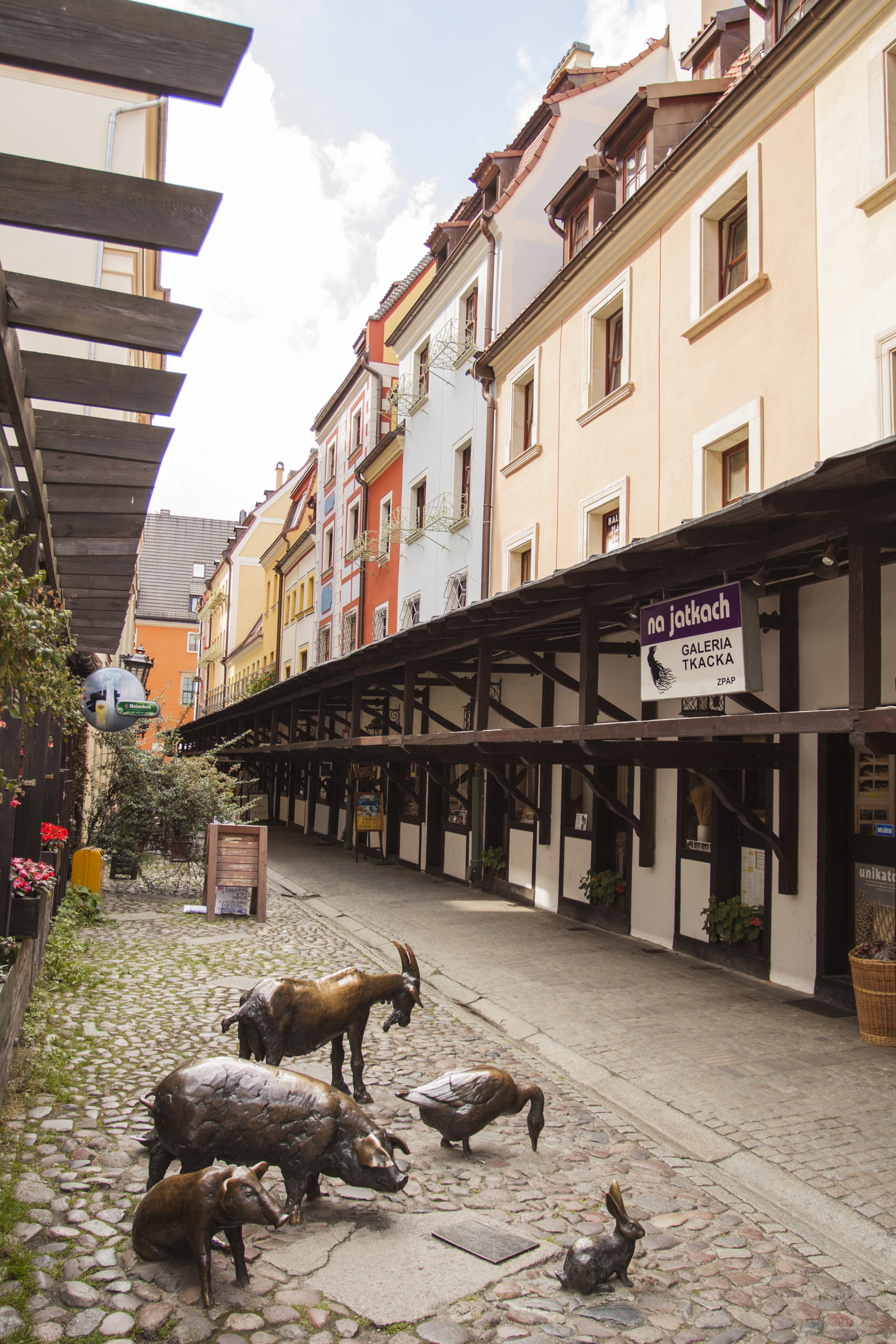
Memorial to Slaughtered Animals

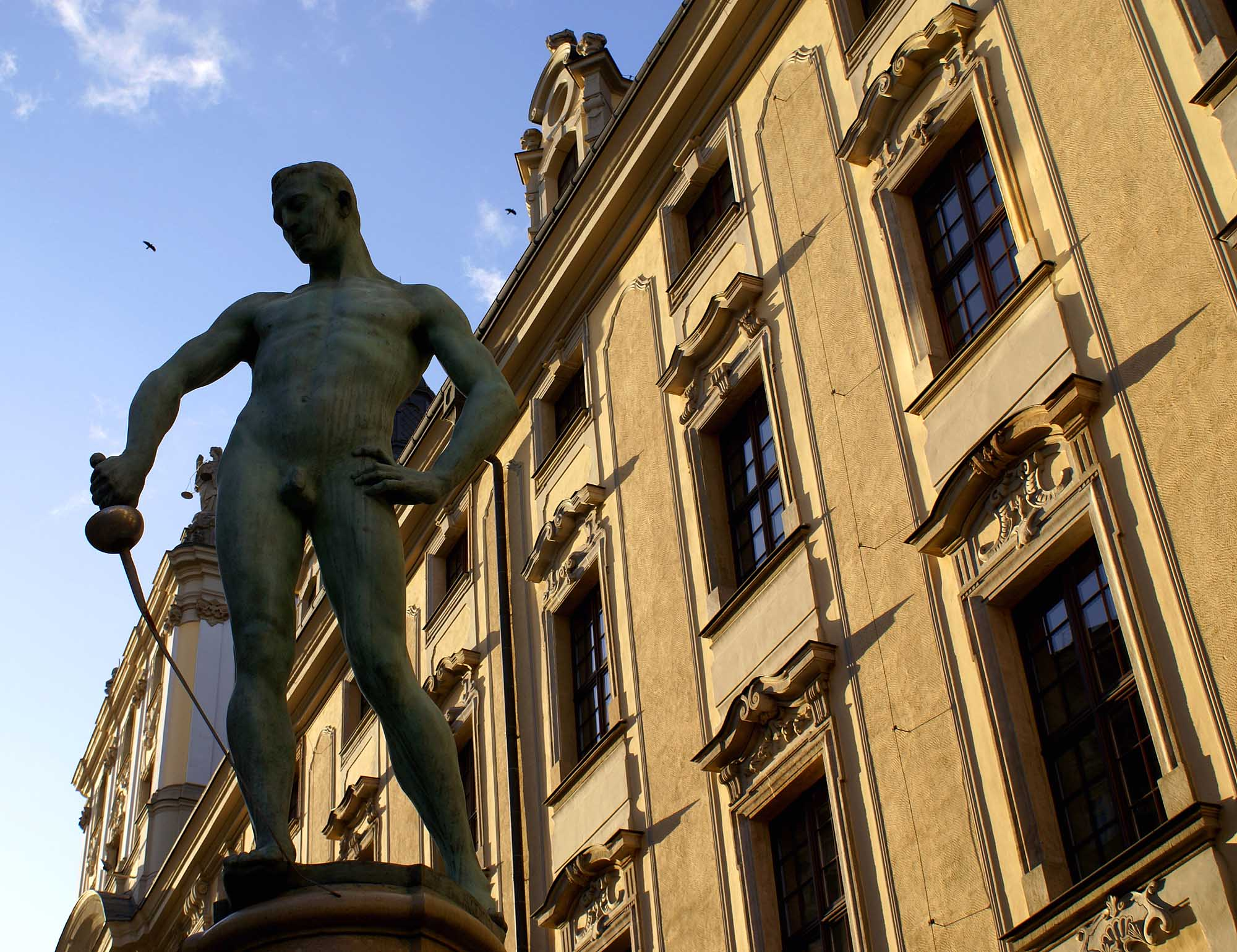
Fencer sculpture next to the University main building

== See also ==
- History of Wrocław
- Nadodrze
