= Wrocław Puppet Theatre =

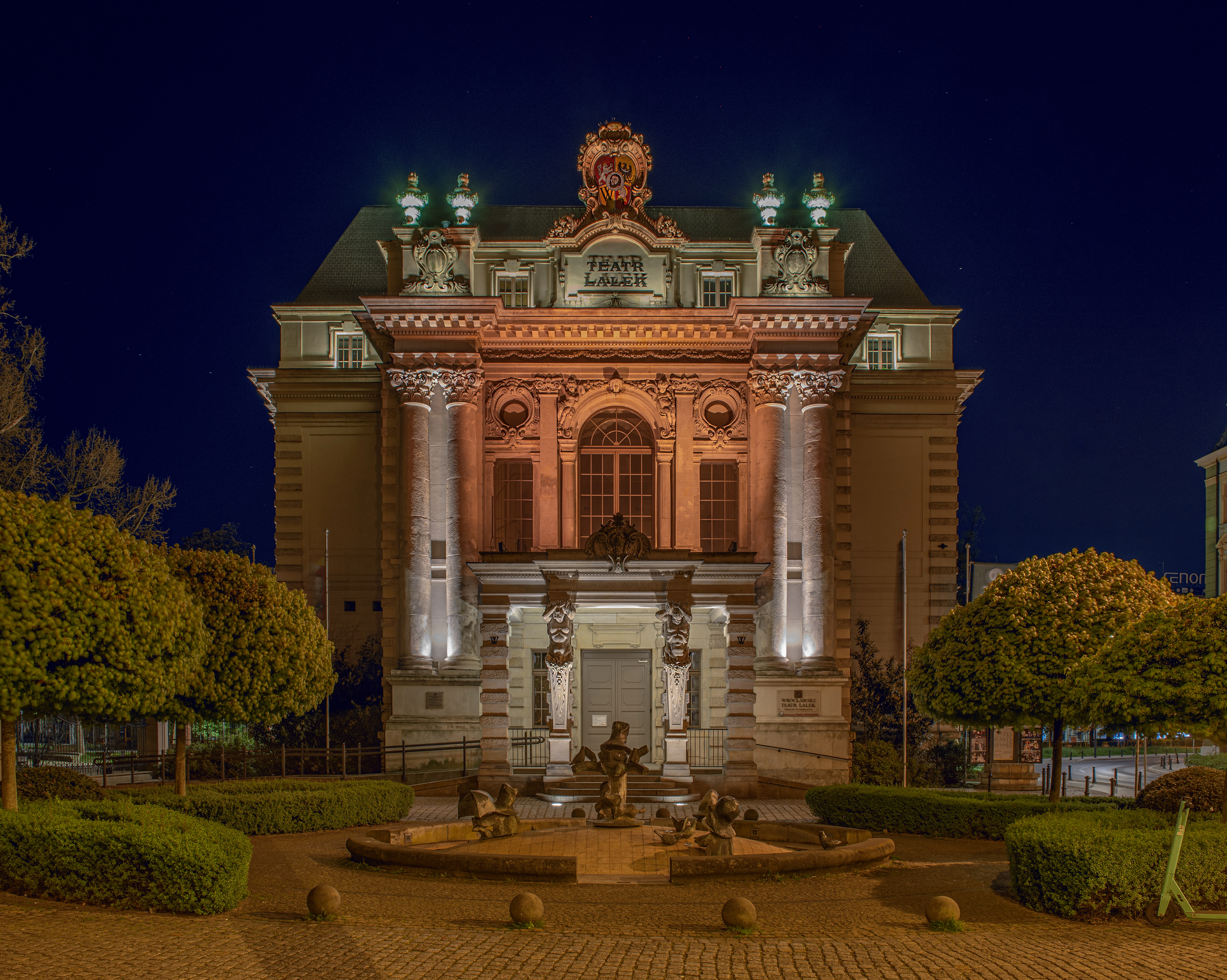

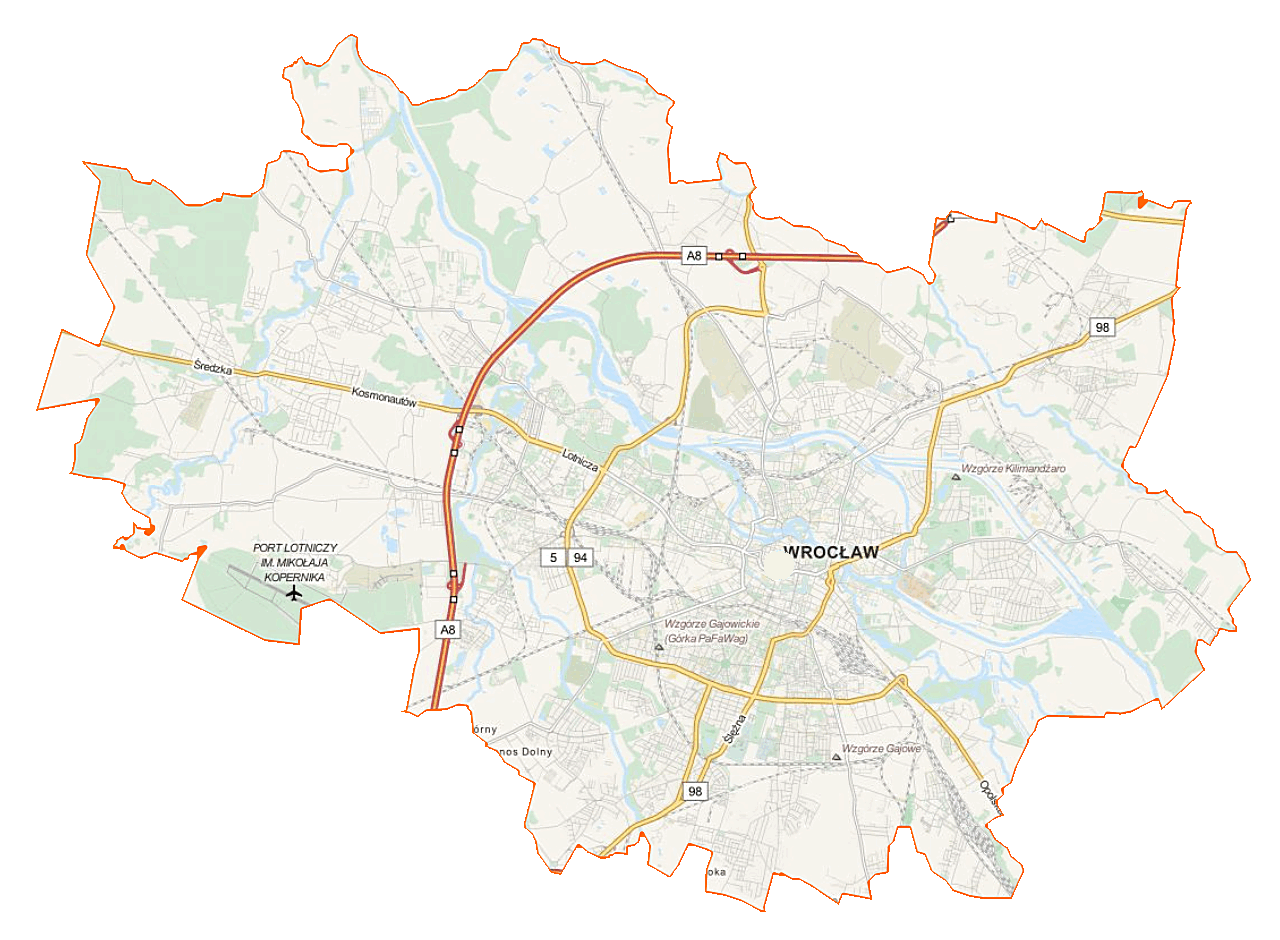
- Location within Wrocław

General information
- Type: Arts complex (Director Roberto Skolmowski)
- Architectural style: Neo-baroque
- Location: Wrocław, Poland
- Coordinates: 51.1051°N 17.0330°E
- Completed: 1894

Design and construction
- Architect: Albert Grau

Wrocław Puppet Theatre (also Teatr Lalek; Silesian: Tyjater Marionetek) is a theatre in Wrocław, Poland. It is located on the Theatre Square, in an old mercantile building next to the Old Town Garden and public baths.

== History ==
The Neo-Baroque building was first designed in 1892–1894, then extended in 1905–1909 according to the architectural plans of Albert Grau. The theater commenced operations in 1946, principally as a children's entertainment venue, and toured the villages of Lower Silesia.

These days, apart from performances for children, it also offers adult fare. Since September 2007, the Roberto Skolmowski is the general and artistic director of the Wrocław Puppet Theatre.

== Present ==
Today, the Wrocław Puppet Theatre is an important European center for puppetry. It has been conferred numerous awards and distinctions and attracted the interest of foreign audiences. Over the last three decades, artists from the theatre have toured in many European countries, including Germany, Finland, France, Italy, Hungary, Sweden, Switzerland and Austria. The theatre has also participated in several festivals in Japan and the Americas.

== Repertoire and attractions ==
The puppet theatre has three independent inside stages: a large stage with 250 seats, a small stage with 80 seats, and an upstairs stage with 60 seats.

In 2008, Wrocław Puppet Theatre launched "Bajkobus" (FairyBus), a mobile stage, which is a mini-version of the theatre building. It contains two separate puppet stages, allowing unlimited staging possibilities.

In 2009, the theatre launched its "Scena Nova" (New Stage), intended for shows with an adult audience.

In 2010, the "Ogród Staromiejski" (Old Town Garden) located next to the theatre was renovated. Since then, the Wrocław Puppet Theatre has been organizing numerous events on the "Scena Letnia" (Summer Stage).
