= Corpus Christi Church =

Corpus Christi Church, or variants thereof, may refer to:

== Australia ==
- Corpus Christi Church, Nundah, listed on the Queensland Heritage Register

== Belarus ==
- Corpus Christi Church, Nesvizh

== Malta ==
- Corpus Christi Church, Għasri

== Poland ==
- Corpus Christi Basilica, Kraków
- Corpus Christi Church, Wrocław

== Republic of Ireland ==
- Corpus Christi Catholic Church, Home Farm Road, Drumcondra, Dublin 9

== United States ==
- Corpus Christi Catholic Church, Pacific Palisades, California
- Corpus Christi Catholic Church (Celebration, Florida)
- Corpus Christi Catholic Church (Fort Dodge, Iowa), listed on the National Register of Historic Places listings in Woodbury County, Iowa
- Corpus Christi R. C. Church Complex, listed on the National Register of Historic Places listings in Erie County, New York
- Corpus Christi Church (New York)
- Corpus Christi Church (Columbus, Ohio)
- Corpus Christi Cathedral (Corpus Christi, Texas)

== United Kingdom ==
- Corpus Christi Church, Boscombe
- Corpus Christi Church, Brixton
- Corpus Christi Church, Covent Garden, headquarters of the Catholic Association of Performing Arts
- Corpus Christi Church, Wokingham

== See also ==
- Corpus Christi Cathedral (disambiguation)
- Chapel of the Sisters of the Poor Clares, Bydgoszcz, Poland, dedicated to Corpus Christi
- Dominican Church, Lviv, formerly dedicated to Corpus Christi
