= Corpus Christi High School =

Corpus Christi High School may refer to:

- Corpus Christi Catholic High School, Wollongong in Australia
- Corpus Christi Catholic Secondary School in Burlington, Ontario
- Corpus Christi Roman Catholic High School, Cardiff in the United Kingdom
- Pallikoodam School in Kottayam, India (formerly called Corpus Christi High School)
- Roy Miller High School in Corpus Christi, Texas (formerly called Corpus Christi High School)

== See also ==
- Corpus Christi Catholic College, Leeds
