= Wrocław Market Hall =

Coordinates: 51°06′45″N 17°02′24″E

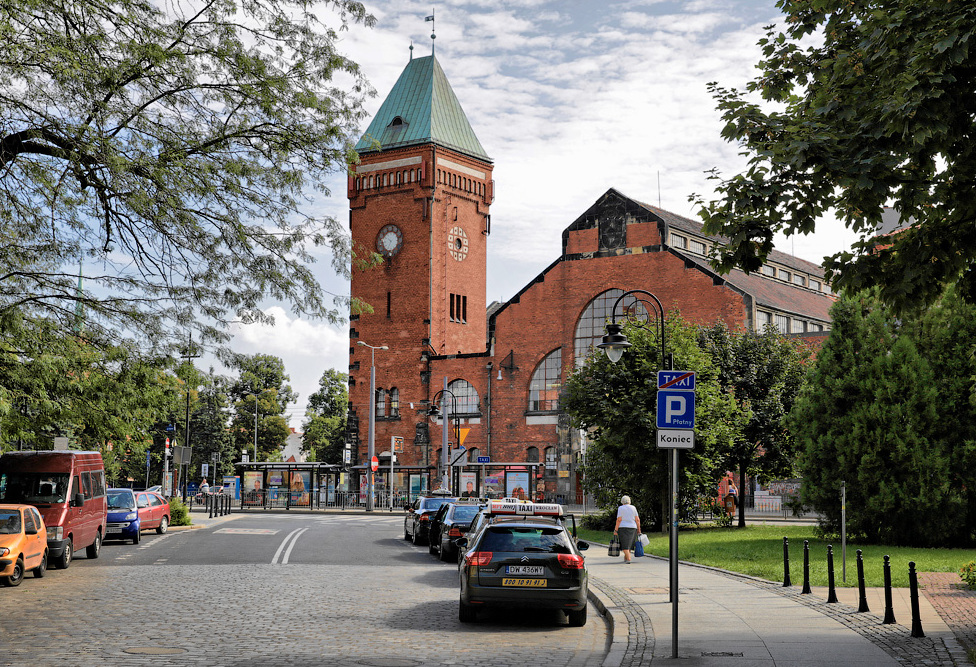
Wrocław Market Hall

Wrocław Market Hall (Polish: Hala Targowa we Wrocławiu, German: Breslauer Markthalle) is a food hall in central Wrocław, Poland. Designed by Richard Plüddemann, it was built between 1906 and 1908 as the Breslauer Markthalle Nr 1, when the city was part of German Empire. The Hall was renowned for its then-innovative application of reinforced concrete trusses, which was unique in Europe at the time.

The complex is situated by Piaskowa Street (Sandstraße), at the junction of Plac Nankiera (Ritterplatz) and Św. Ducha Street (Heiligegeiststraße) close to Main Market Square and the historic Old Town. It was erected at the same time as another smaller hall with the same interior structure at Kolejowa Street. Both buildings were created in order to organize street trading in the city center. Once completed, all street markets were moved into the newly opened halls.

The building was not severely damaged during World War II and continued to be used as originally intended shortly after, whereas the Kolejowa Hall was destroyed and its ruins demolished in 1973. The Wrocław Market Hall was refurbished between 1980 and 1983, and again in the years 2018–2019; it remains one of the biggest produce markets in the city.

== Gallery ==
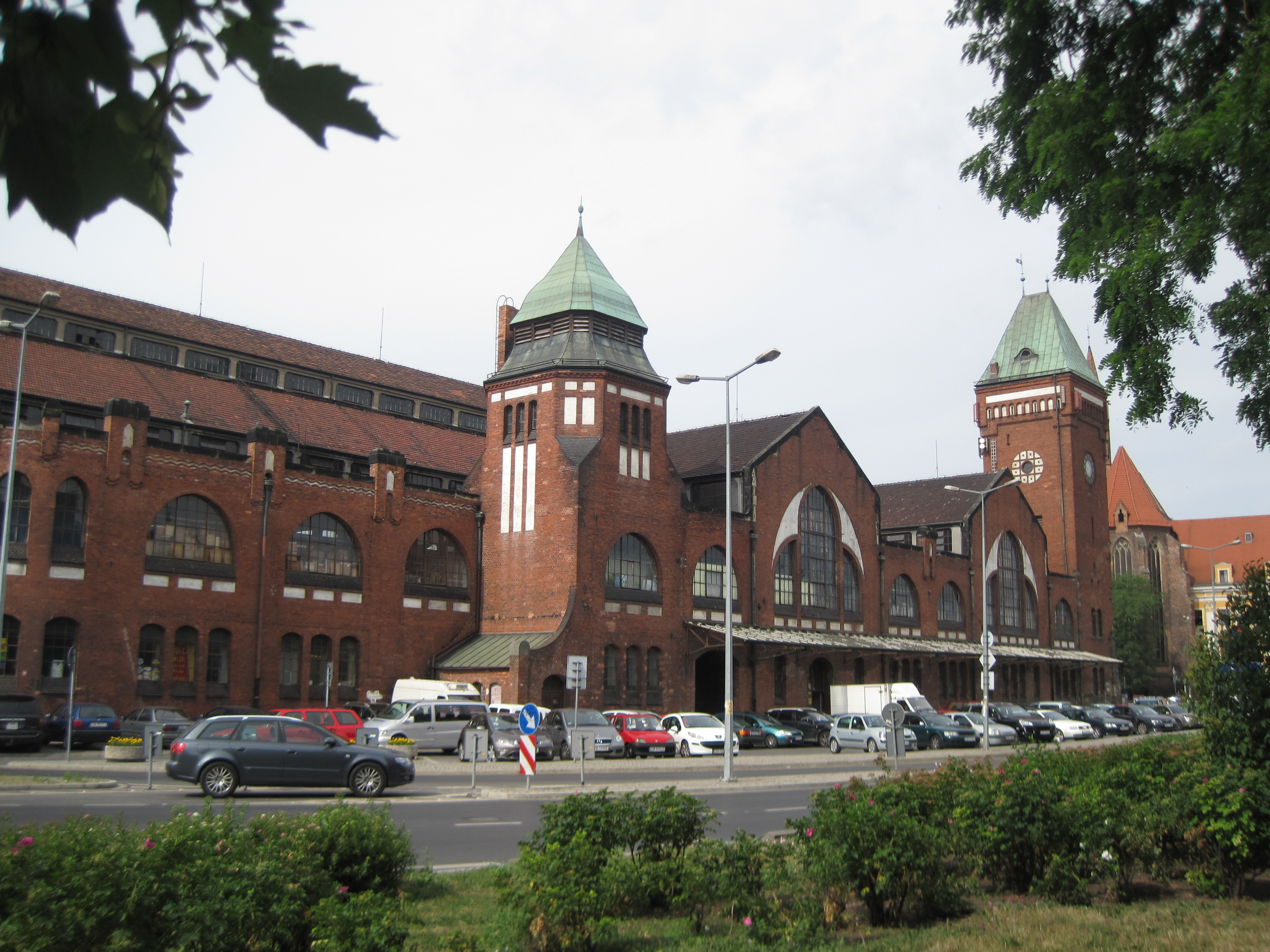

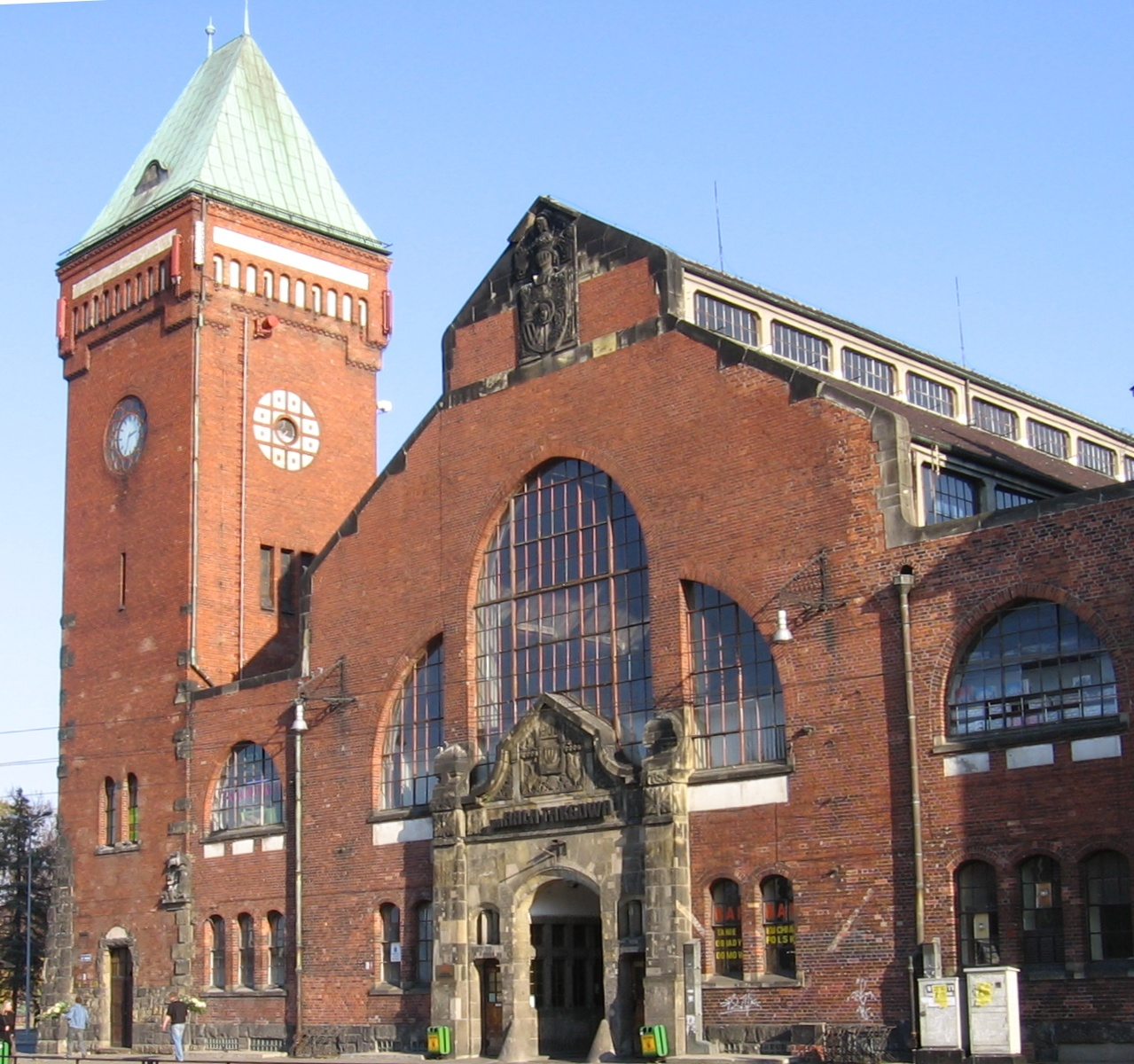

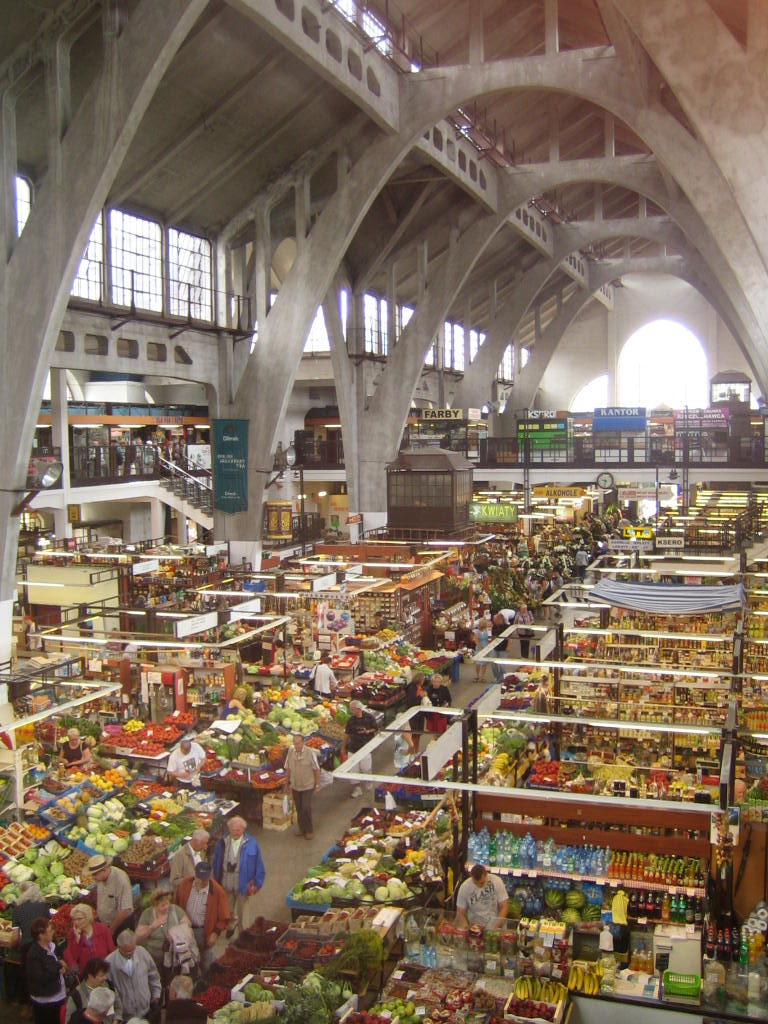

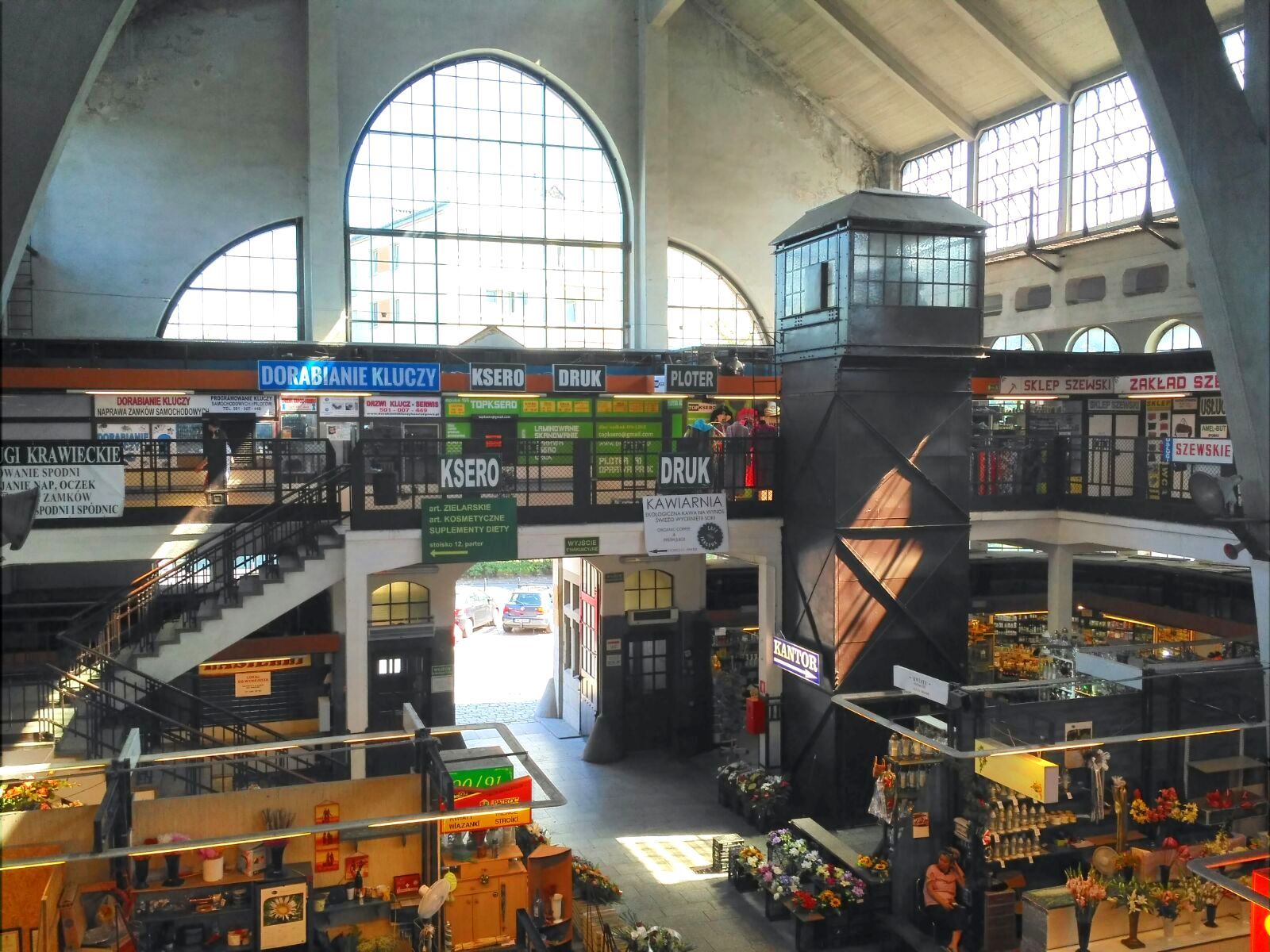
