= Corpus Christi Cathedral =

Corpus Christi Cathedral may refer to:

- Corpus Christi Cathedral, Tlalnepantla, Mexico
- Corpus Christi Cathedral (Port Harcourt), Nigeria
- Corpus Christi Cathedral (Corpus Christi, Texas), United States

== See also ==
- Corpus Christi Church (disambiguation)
