= Corpus Domini (disambiguation) =

Corpus Domini or Corpus Christi is a Christian feast.

Corpus Domini may also refer to:

- Corpus Domini, Bologna
- Corpus Domini Monastery (Ferrara), a monastery in Ferrara
- Corpus Domini, Turin
- Corpus Domini (Venice), a former Dominican convent in Venice
