= Corpus Christi shooting =

Corpus Christi shooting may refer to:

- 1995 Corpus Christi shooting, a mass shooting that occurred at the Walter Rossler Co. on April 3, 1995
- Murder of Selena, the fatal shooting of an American Tejano singer at a Days Inn hotel on March 31, 1995
- Murder of Adriana Marines, the fatal shooting of an American girl of Mexican descent at her home on September 27, 1997
