= Museum of the University of Wrocław =

Coordinates: 51.113773°N 17.033451°E

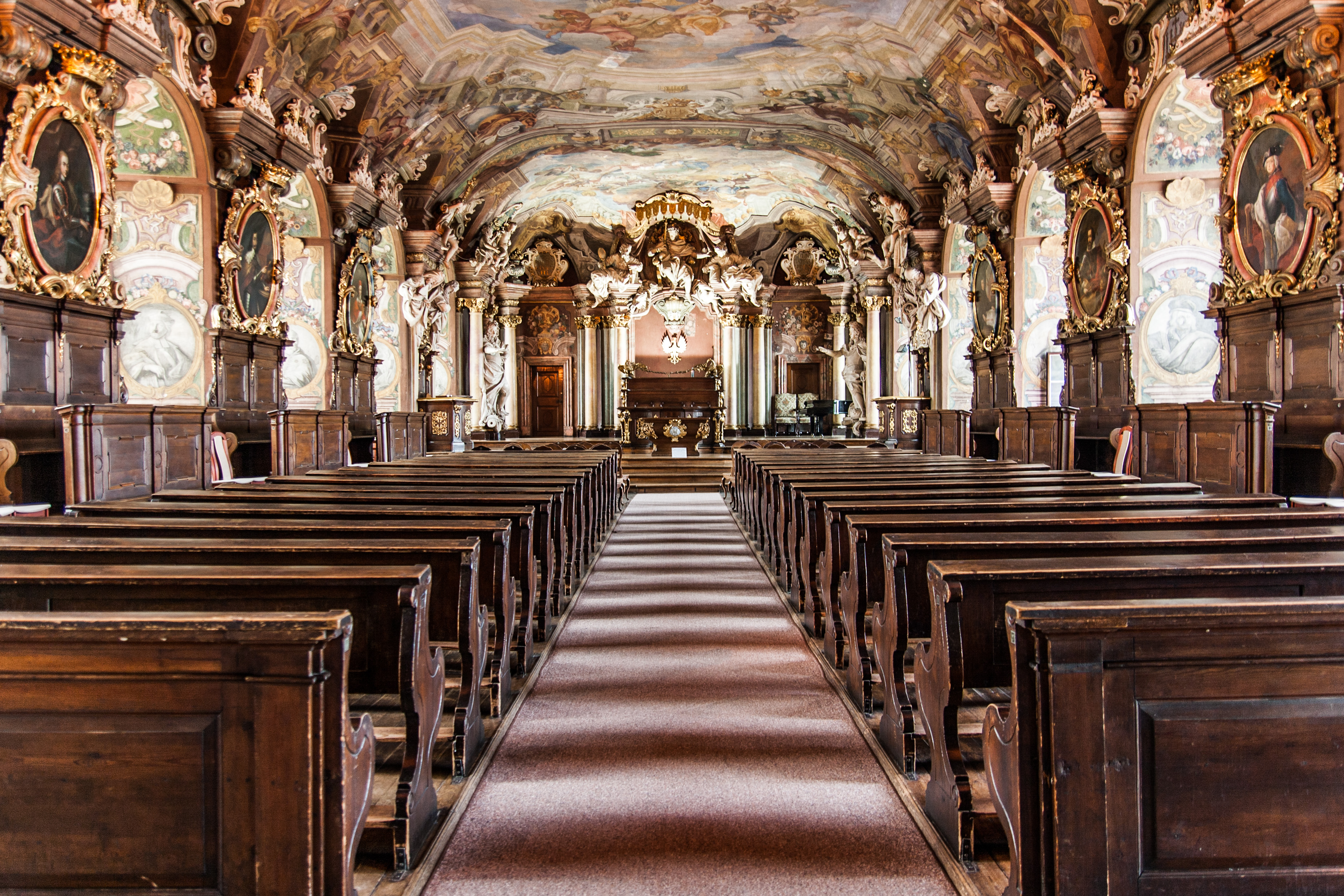
- Aula Leopoldina
- Established: 1992
- Location: plac Uniwersytecki 1, 48-300 Wrocław, Poland
- Type: University museum
- Director: prof. dr hab. Jan Harasimowicz
- Public transit access: Trams: 3, 5, 7, 14, 23
- Website: muzeum.uni.wroc.pl

The Museum of the University of Wrocław is a museum in Wrocław, Poland, displaying many of the historical objects of the University of Wrocław.

Museum was established on 6 August 1992 as the result of converting the Museum Collection Department of the Archives of the University of Wrocław into an independent unit within the central administration. The Museum's Department "House of Archaeologists" on campus at Koszarowa 3 (building no. 8), where temporary archaeological exhibitions are presented, was established on 13 May 2005.

The museum is located in Wrocław on the Oder riverbank, in the university's main building (Uniwersytecki Square 1) designed by de:Christoph Tausch in Baroque style. Its architectural structure with splendid sculptural decor and paintings is regarded as one of the most valuable Baroque monuments in Poland and Central and Eastern Europe.

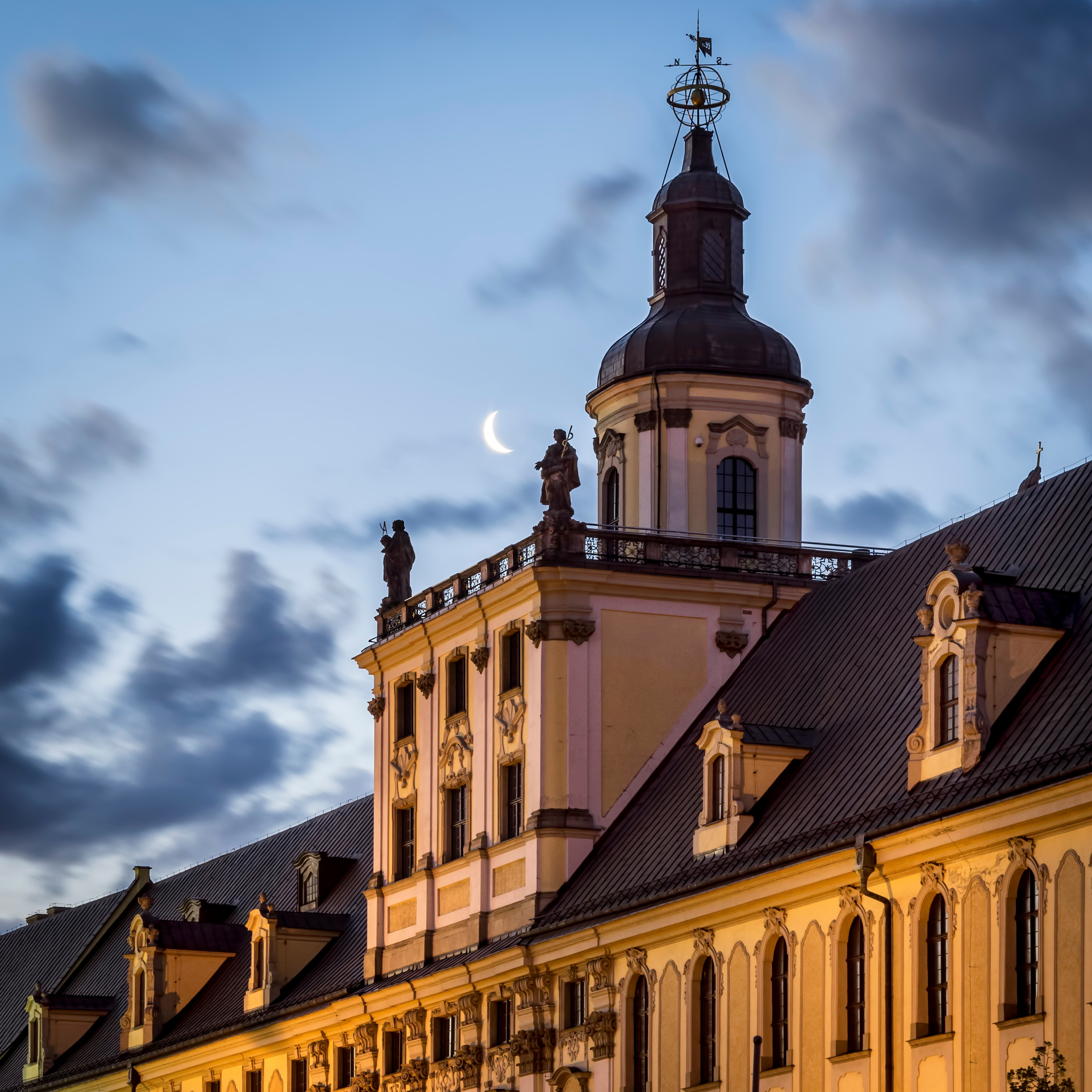
Mathematical Tower

== Structure ==
The museum consists of the following historical halls:

- pl:Aula Leopoldina, the biggest and most representative hall in the main building, is the only secular Baroque interior in Poland with full decor - illusionist wall paintings by Johann Christoph Handke of Olomouc, decor and sculptural elements by Franz Mangoldt of Moravia and Italian master de:Ignatius Provisore
- Oratorium Marianum, with Baroque interior and furnishings as rich as in Aula Leopoldina, originally served as a chapel between 1728 and 1741. Following the secularisation of the Jesuit Order and the establishment of the university in 1811, it was converted into a concert hall.
- Mathematical Tower with a viewing terrace at 42 meters is the former Astronomical Observatory, designed in 1791 by a Jesuit and professor of the university, de:Longinus Anton Jungnitz.
- three exhibition rooms: Roman Longchamps de Bérier Hall, Stefan Banach Hall, and Pillar Hall.

The collections are largely devoted to the history of the university, from the 15th century to the present day. The oldest collections still have descriptive fiches from the Leopoldina Academy, although the majority comes from later periods, after 1811.

== See also ==
- List of Jesuit sites
