= Corpus Christi Catholic High School, Wollongong =

Corpus Christi Catholic High School

Location
- 100 Industrial Road; Oak Flats, Wollongong, New South Wales; 2529; Australia; 34°34′11″S 150°49′00″E

Information
- Type: Independent co-educational secondary day school
- Motto: Abide in Christ
- Denomination: Roman Catholic
- Established: 2006; 20 years ago
- Oversight: Roman Catholic Diocese of Wollongong
- Principal: Wayne Marshall
- Staff: 38 (2025)
- Teaching staff: 86.7 FTE (2025)
- Years: 7–12
- Enrollment: 1126 (2025)
- Campus: Suburban
- Houses: Chisholm; Ingham; Davis; Deane
- Colours: Red, blue, olive
- Website: www.ccchsdow.catholic.edu.au

Corpus Christi Catholic High School (CCCHS) is an independent Roman Catholic co-educational secondary day school, located in Oak Flats, in the Illawarra region of New South Wales, Australia. Founded in 2006, the school is operated by the Wollongong Catholic Education Office in its service of the Roman Catholic Diocese of Wollongong. The school is registered by the NSW Board of Studies as an accredited Year 7 to Year 12 high school.

The school was designed Glanville Architects and built by One Build, Wide Form, and funded by the Australian Commonwealth and NSW governments and Catholic Authorities.

== Learning Circle Program ==
Since the School's inception in 2006 the Students at Corpus Christi have been a part of a Learning Circle Program to enhance their experience at the School. Learning Circles are split up into stages. Stage 4 Learning Circles consist of Year 7 and 8 Students. Stage 5 Learning Circles consist of Year students and Stage 6 Learning Circles consist only of Year 11 or Year 12 students, Students in this phase of learning are paired with Learning Advisors that can help them most in their course areas. From 2006 to 2009 Learning Circles were picked at random and students were put into Learning Circles in no real order. More often than not, in Year 7 in particular students would not be with their Primary School Counterparts. In 2010 the organisation of the Learning Circles was altered when each colour house was designated a House Leader and Students would be put into their Learning Circle according to their House Colour. Prior to this the House Colours were used only for sporting events but now they play role in school life. From 2012 and beyond each House has expanded in Learning Circles due to the number of students who will be in the school. Corpus Christi

== Recognition ==
In 2007, CCCHS was named an Apple School of Excellence by Apple Australia. Staff and students presented their innovative approach to integration at the 2007 ACEL conference held in Sydney in a session entitled "Digging Deeper: Designing a CLE". In 2008 CCCHS principal & staff received an Innovative Education award from the Australian College of Educations.

CCCHS has participated in the regional science fair and was highly commended in the 2007 Australian ANZAC Day awards.

Elizabeth Carnegie worked at Corpus Christi Catholic High School. Her work is primarily to foster innovative pedagogy and the integration of Religion and Gospel Values into curriculum. She contributed to the Oxford Studies of Religion textbook and the Heinemann Study Guide.

== See also ==
- List of Catholic schools in New South Wales
- Catholic education in Australia
- List of schools in Illawarra and the South East
- Education in Australia
