= Corpus Christi Church, Wrocław =

Church building in Wrocław, Poland

Corpus Christi Church
- Kościół Bożego Ciała
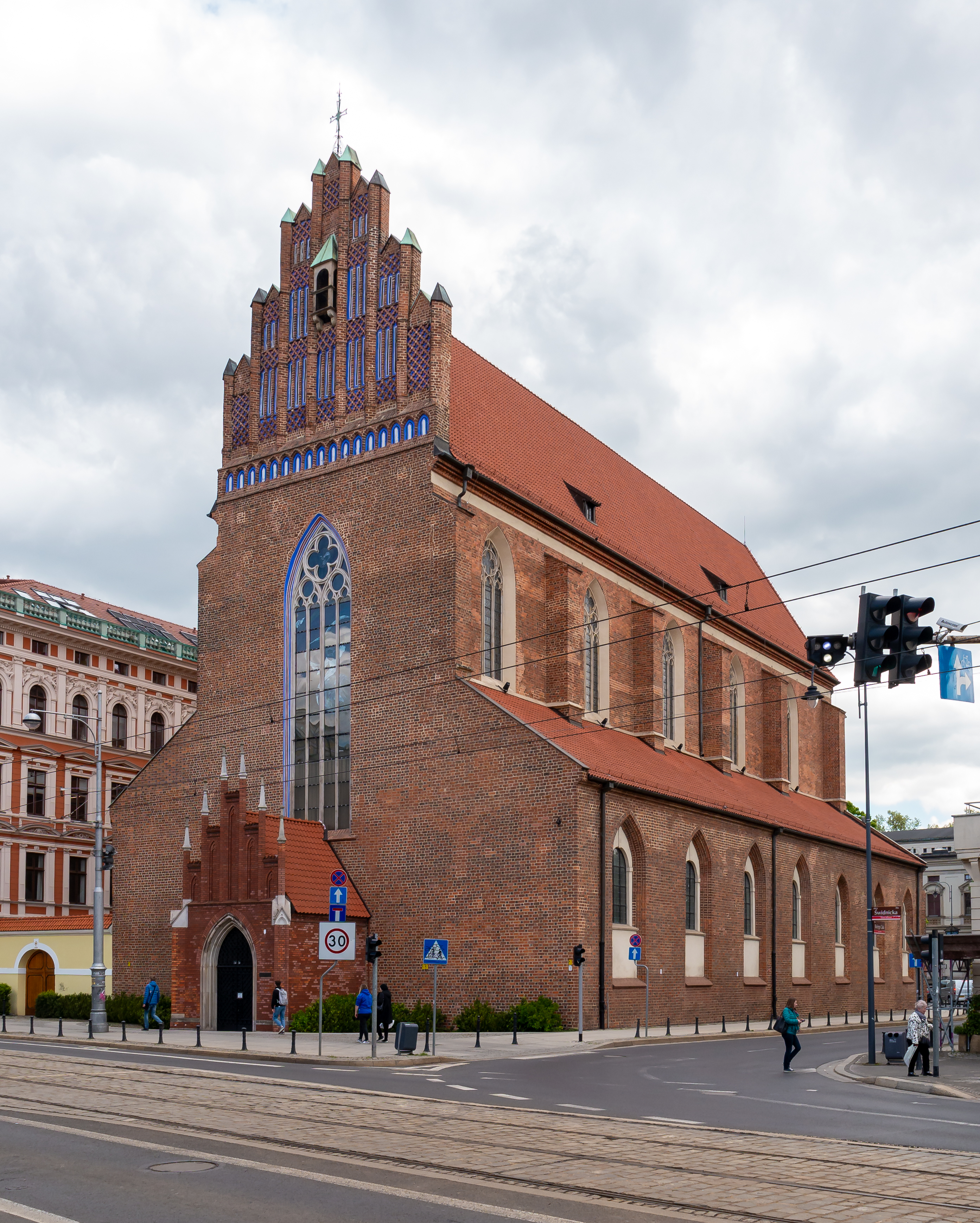

- 51.1050°N 17.0317°E
- Location: Wrocław
- Country: Poland
- Language: Polish
- Denomination: Catholic

History
- Status: Parish church
- Dedication: Body of Christ

Architecture
- Functional status: Active
- Style: Gothic

Administration
- Archdiocese: Wrocław

Corpus Christi Church is a Gothic church in Wrocław, Poland. The church is located at the corner of Świdnicka and ul. Bożego Ciała (Corpus Christi Street).

== History ==
The first church was constructed by the Order of Saint John (Bailiwick of Brandenburg). Old Catholic till 1920, now Roman Catholic Parish.

Registered as a landmarked building number 13 of 27.11.1947 and A/289/19 of 23.10.1961.

== External pages ==
- Corpus Christi Parish
