= Mariusz Mikołajek =

Polish painter

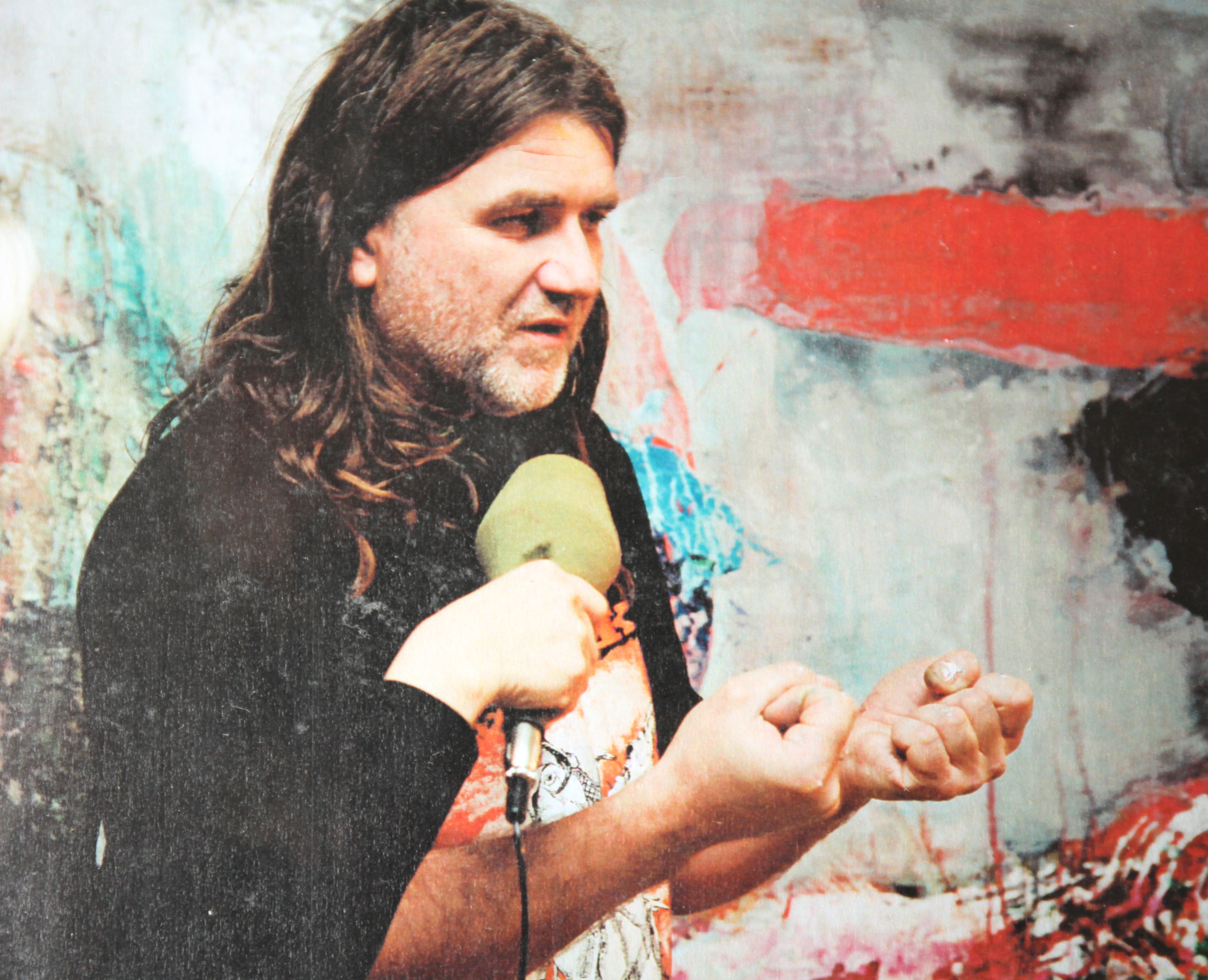
- M. Mikołajek in 2001
- Born: February 5, 1958 (age 68); Wrocław, Poland
- Education: Eugeniusz Geppert Academy of Fine Arts
- Occupation: Painter

Signature
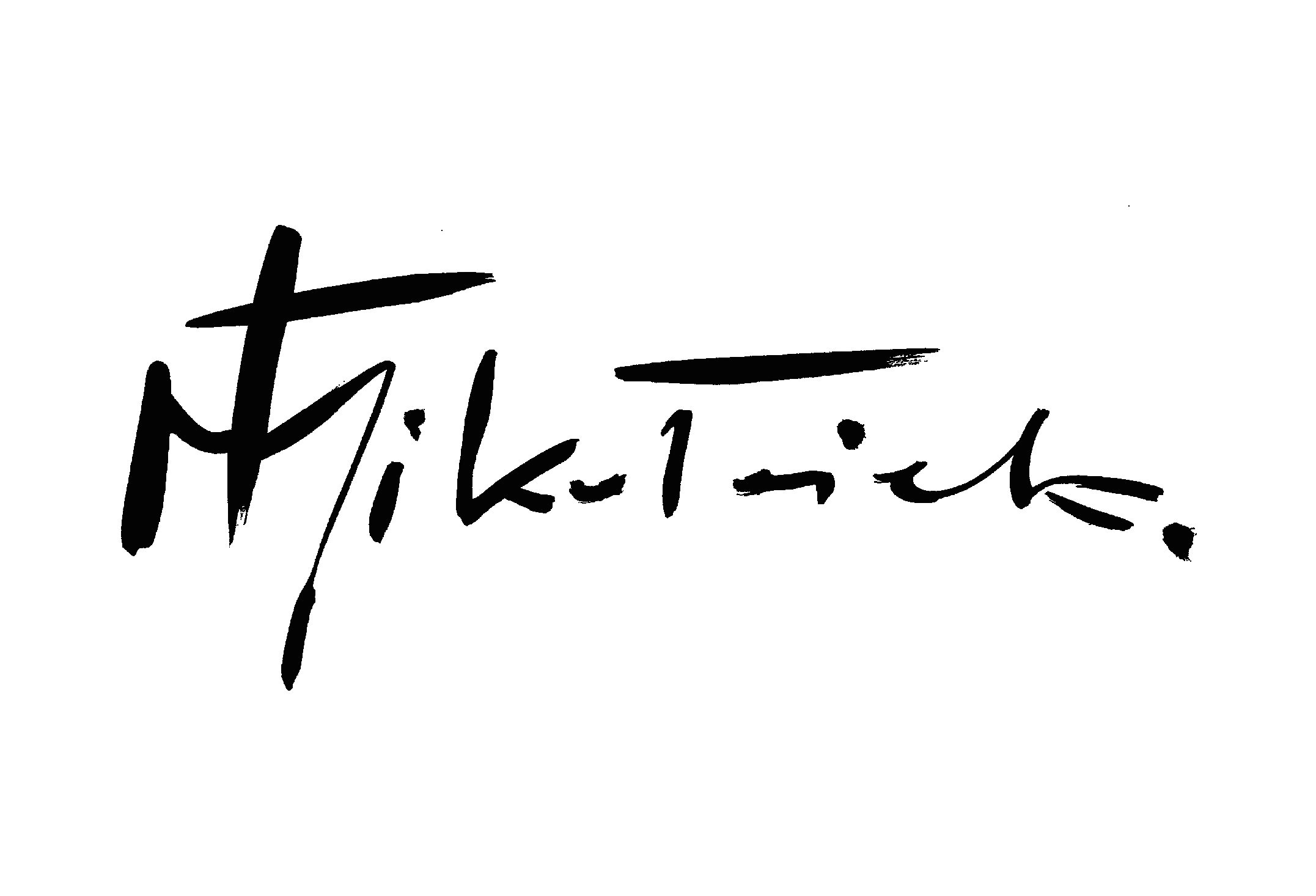

Mariusz Mikołajek (born February 5, 1958, in Wrocław) is a Polish painter and organizer of cultural events.

== Biography ==
Mariusz Mikołajek concluded his education with a master's degree from the Eugeniusz Geppert Academy of Fine Arts in Wrocław under the supervision of Prof. Konrad Jarodzki in 1984. He defended his thesis at the Collegiate Church of the Holy Cross and St. Bartholomew in Wrocław on Cathedral Island. His graduation paintings were confiscated by the Security Service, which tried to invalidate the artist's thesis. Before, there had been attempts to expel him from the university due to his participation in an anticommunist demonstration. In both cases, his teachers’ robust support helped his cause. In the 1980s, he circulated underground art. He returned to his official activities in 1991 when, with Christos Mandzios, Czesław Chwiszczuk and Zbigniew Mil and in collaboration with Polish State Railways (PKP), he presented the exhibit Look When You’re Passing By… Look, Everybody’s Passing By… in the main hall of the Wrocław Główny railway station. For more than a decade, Mikołajek has been cooperating with Witold Liszkowski in the broadly-conceived project We’re Building a City of Art. The most well-known productions from this series are Kid's Guernica, a two-week happening in the Wrocław Market Square (2011) consisting of a huge painting made by children of Wrocław and an art campaign associated with the 2012 UEFA Championship titled Supporter's Art Rooms in the courtyard of the Wrocław Contemporary Museum. With Witold Liszkowski and Jan Mikołajek, in 2012 he established the OK. Art. Foundation operating mainly in the Nadodrze housing development which is being revitalized. Among the results of their efforts are two universally admired murals — Discovering Art Yard and Our Atelier Yard — on Roosevelt Street in Nadodrze. Mikołajek's painting falls between representative art and abstraction. His theme is the human, his emotions and relations. Mikołajek stresses the role of light in building up his creative expression. He has had several dozen individual exhibitions in Poland and abroad and has taken part in many collective exhibitions. His works are in many private and public collections in Poland (the National Museum in Kraków, the Lower Silesian Society for the Encouragement of Fine Arts) as well as abroad. Mikołajek is a member of the Association of Polish Artists and Designers.

He is the son of writer Tadeusz Mikołajek. Personal life: married, father of seven children.

== Awards and distinctions ==
- Commissar's Honorary Award for the All Poland Youth Painting Exhibition The Way and the Truth (1985)
- Wrocław Association of Polish Artists and Designers’ Award of the Year for preparing the exhibit Always the Beginning at Bourgeois Brewery (2010)
- The Bronze Medal for Merit to Culture – Gloria Artis (2014)

== Selected individual exhibits ==
- Always the Beginning: A Meeting – Former Mine Science and Art Center, Wałbrzych (2019)
- All that Jeans – City Gallery, Wrocław (2015)
- A Place – BWA Wrocław, Awangarda Gallery, Wrocław (2013)
- Always the Beginning – Bourgeois Brewery, Wrocław (2009)
- Gate Gallery – Aalborg, Denmark (2007)
- A Space Redeemed – City Museum, Wrocław (2005)

== Selected collective exhibits ==
- The Signs of the Apocalypse – Center of Contemporary Art in Toruń (2020)
- Robinson’s Ship – a City Gallery exhibit housed in the building of the Museum of Architecture, Wrocław (2019)
- Art. WORK / PL–UA, Artists about work, Wrocław City Gallery – Mystetskyi Arsenal, Kyiv (2017)
- Teraz Sztuka / Art Now!, European Parliament, Brussels (2009) – exhibit on the occasion of the centenary of the Association of Polish Artists and Designers
- On the Way to Freedom 1966-1994 – Municipal Gallery bwa in Bydgoszcz (2009)
- Polish contemporary art exhibit – National Museum, Kraków (2009)

== Selected works ==
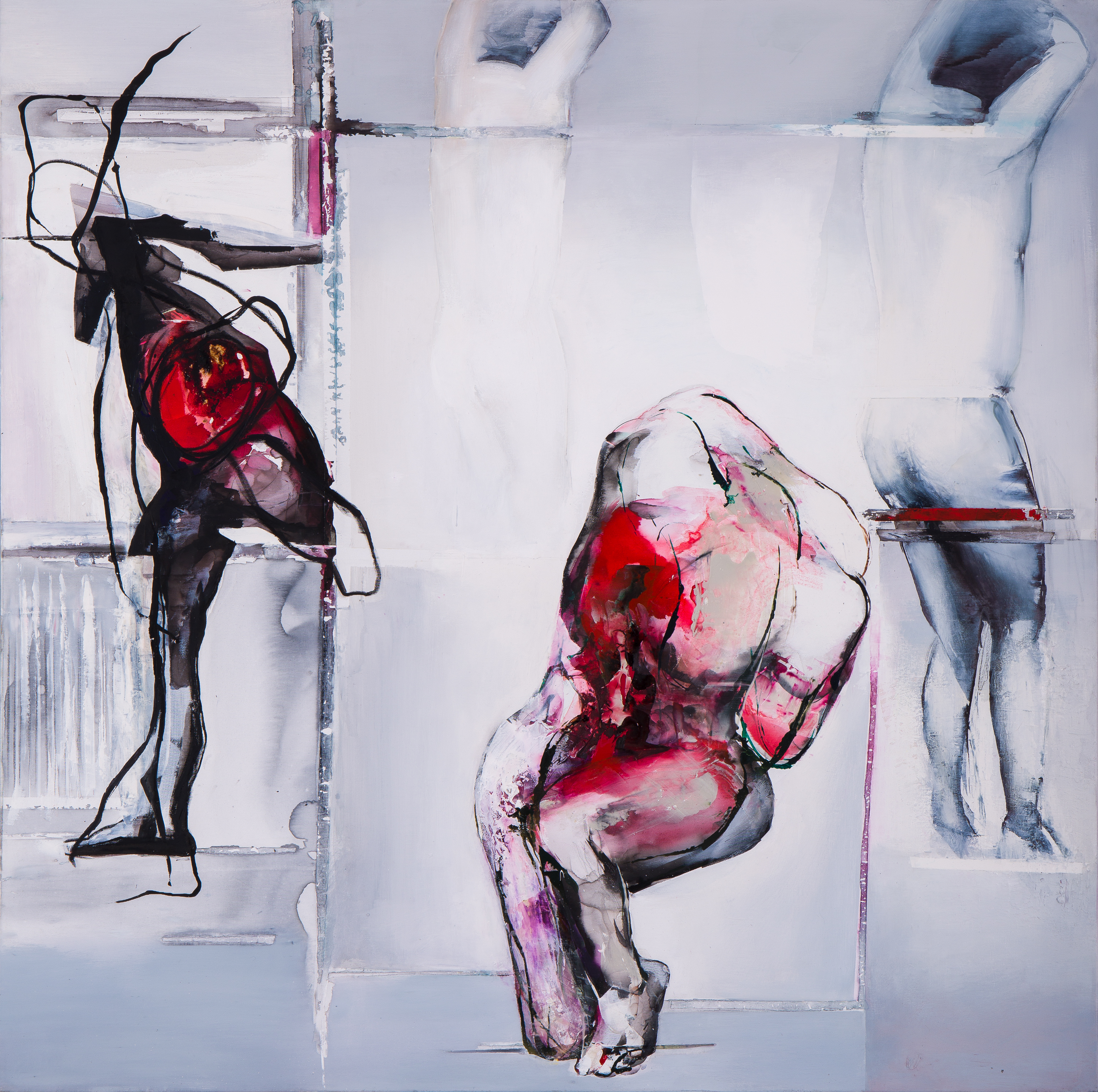
Before-after V (2020)

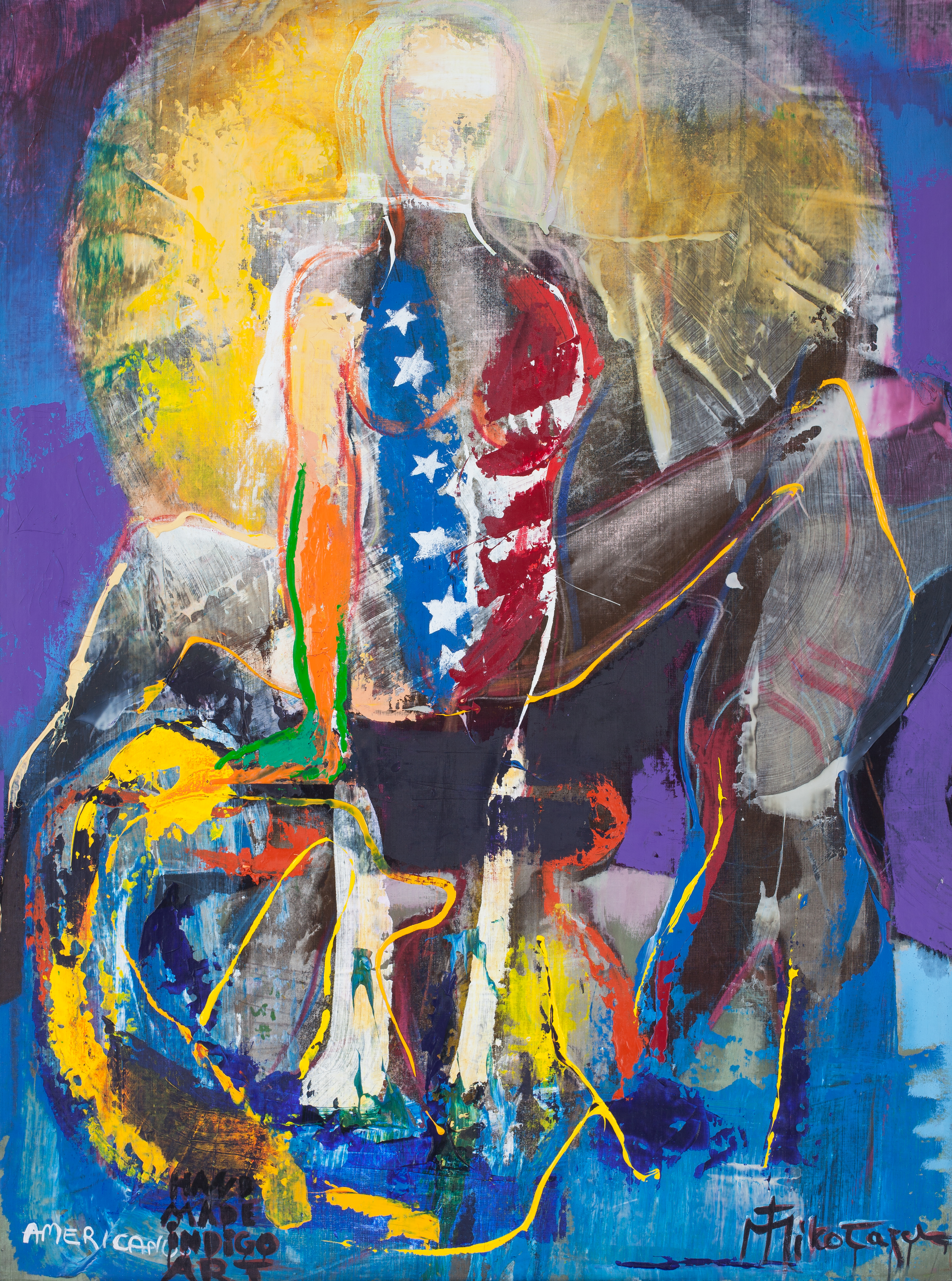
Sexa (2009)

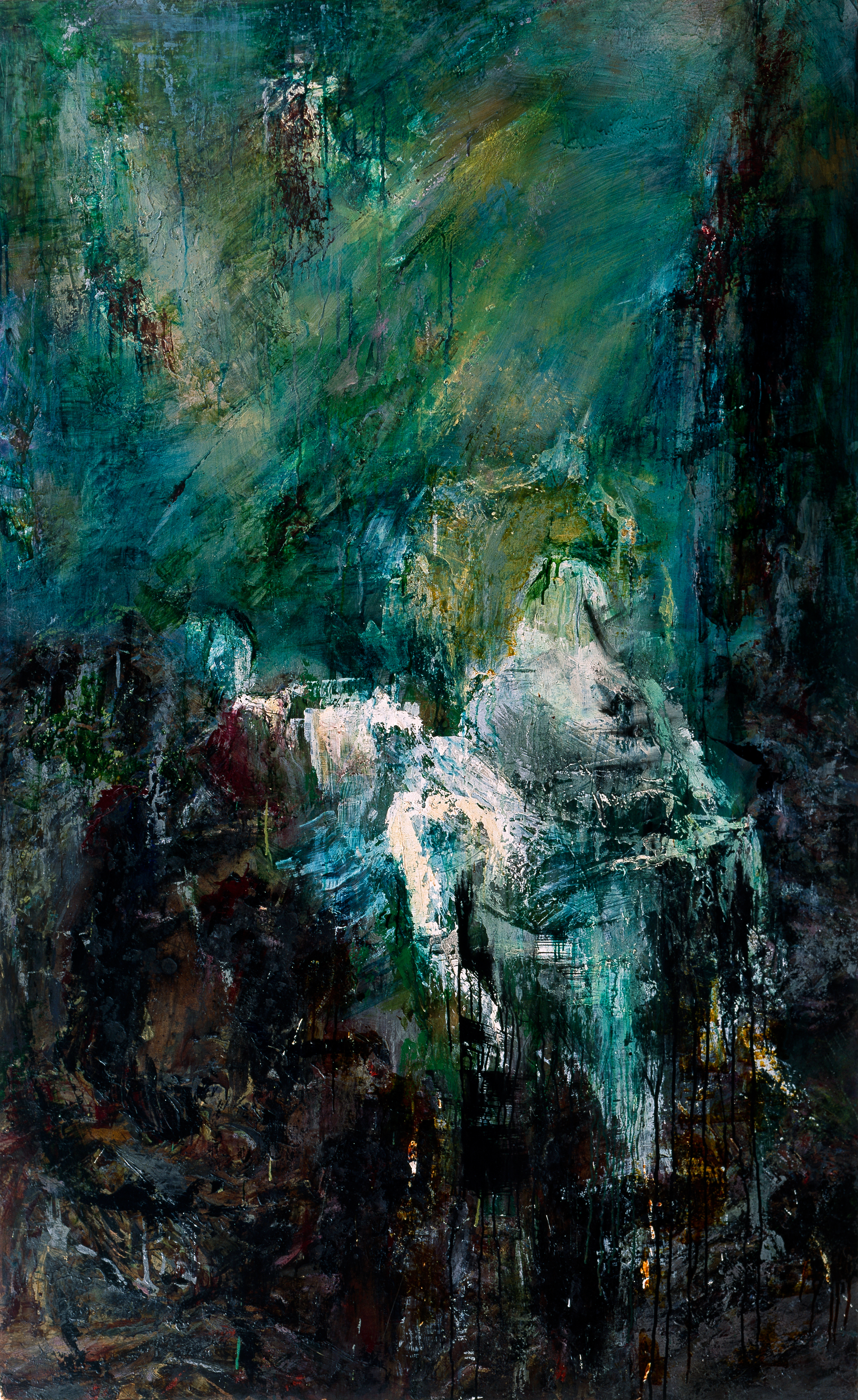
Pietà (1990)

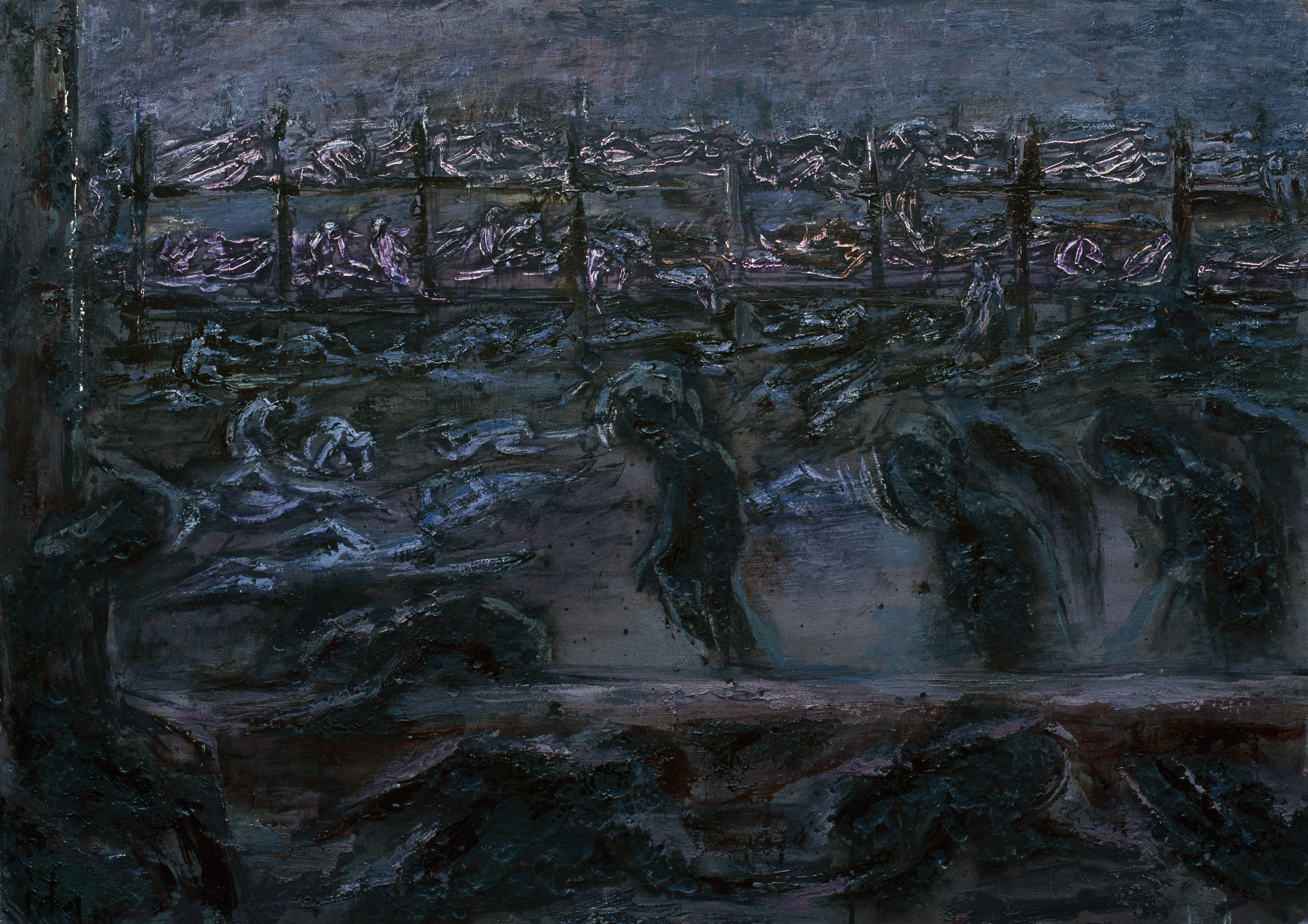
After the Numbering (1989)
