= Dombrücke =

Dombrücke may refer to:

- Cathedral Bridge, a road and rail bridge in Cologne, Germany from 1859 to 1909
- Tumski Bridge, a pedestrian bridge in Wrocław, Poland built in 1889
