= Cathedral Island, Wrocław =

Historic part in Wrocław, Poland

Coordinates: 51°06′56″N 17°02′39″E

Cathedral Island Polish: Ostrów Tumski
- Historic part of Wrocław
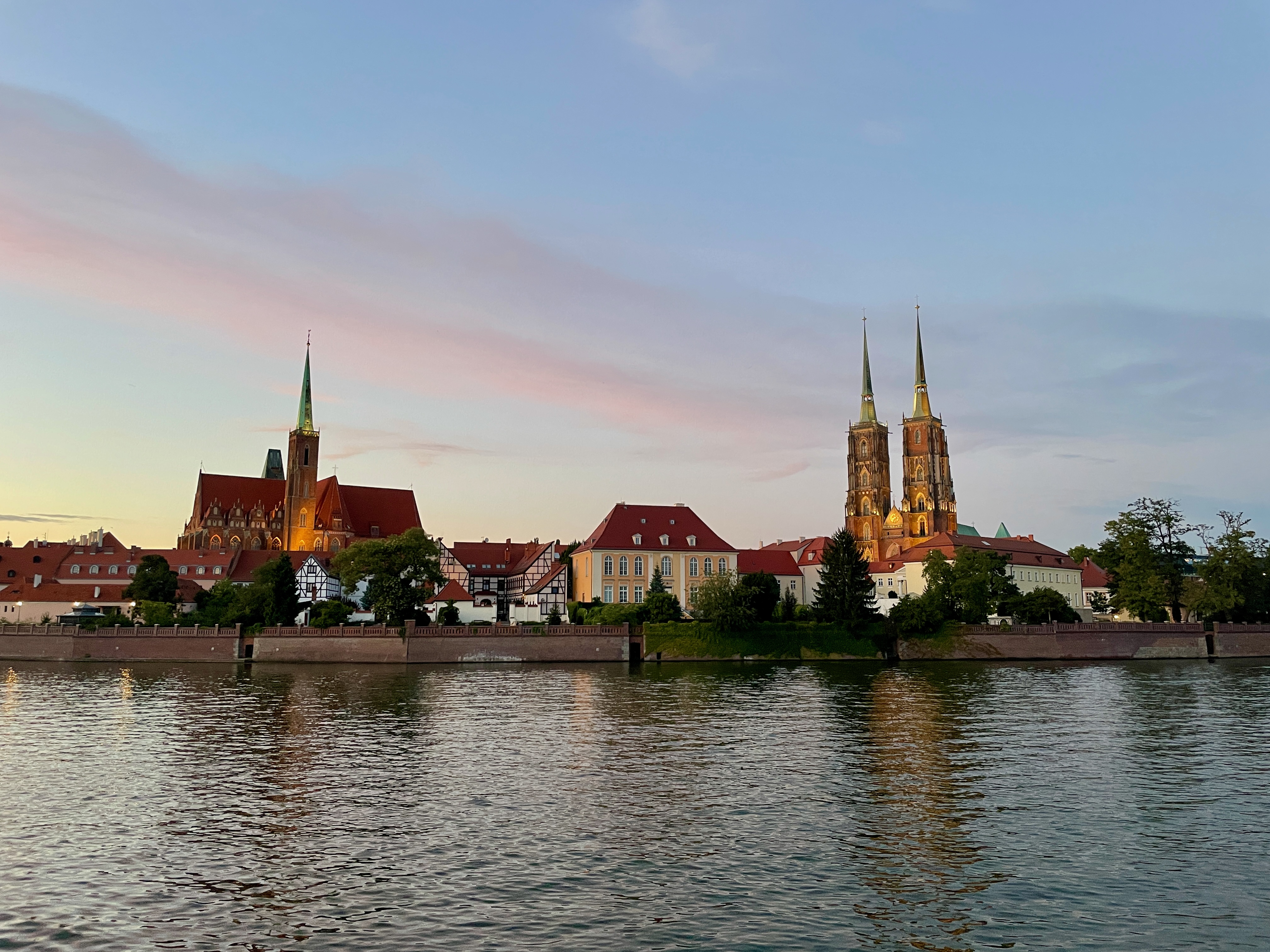
- Interactive map of Cathedral Island
- Country: Poland
- Voivodeship: Lower Silesian
- County/City: Wrocław
- Time zone: UTC+1 (CET)
  - Summer (DST): UTC+2 (CEST)
- Area code: +48 71
- Vehicle registration: DW

Historic Monument of Poland
- Designated: 1994-09-08
- Part of: Wrocław – historic city center
- Reference no.: M.P. 1994 nr 50 poz. 425

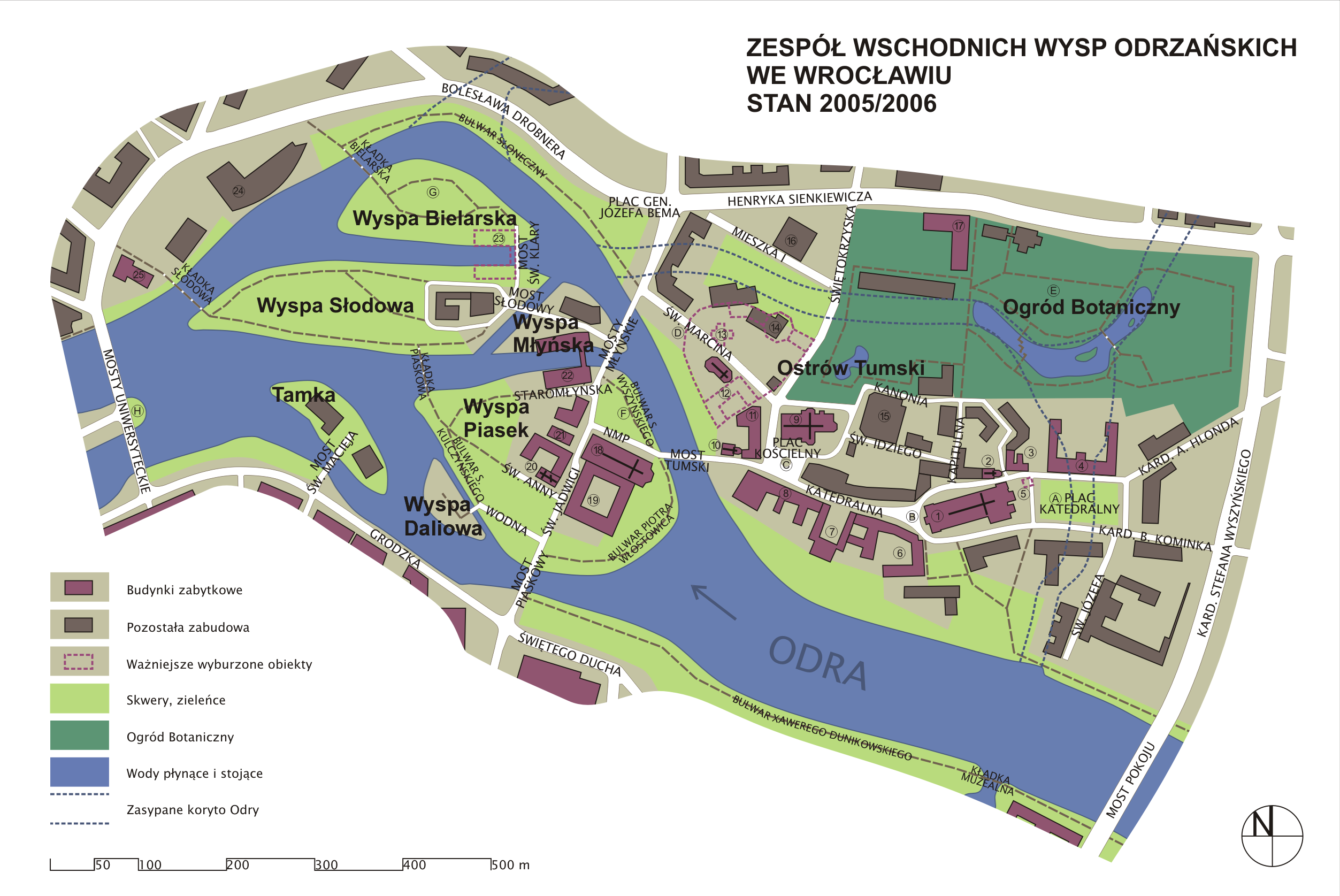
Cathedral Island and the Botanical Garden with the visible remains of the oxbow lake

The Cathedral Island (Polish: Ostrów Tumski, [ˈɔstruf ˈtumski], German: Dominsel, [ˈdoːmɪnzəl]) is the oldest part of the city of Wrocław in south-western Poland. It was formerly an island (Old Polish: ostrów) between branches of the Oder River. Today it is the city's popular tourist destination. The Cathedral Island in Wrocław is one of the few remaining places in Europe where a lamplighter lights the gas street lamps every evening.

== History ==
Archaeological excavations have shown that the western part of the Cathedral Island, between the Church of St. Martin and the Holy Cross, was the first area to be inhabited. The first, wooden church (St. Martin), dating from the 10th century, was surrounded by defensive walls built on the banks of the river. The island had approximately 1,500 inhabitants at that time.

The first constructions on the Cathedral Island were built in the 10th century by the Piast dynasty, and were made from wood. The first building from solid material was St. Martin's chapel, built probably at the beginning of the eleventh century by Benedictine monks. Not long after the first cathedral was raised, in place of the small church. Religious buildings appeared on Cathedral Island because during the Congress of Gniezno in AD 1000, it was decided to create a bishopric in Wrocław.

In 1163 the settlement was raided by Boleslaw I the Tall who had returned from his banishment. After taking control of the area and waiting for the political situation in Silesia to stabilize, he chose the Cathedral Island as his new capital. He began replacing the wooden defenses with brick ones and built a Roman-style residence.

In 1315, the Cathedral Island was sold to the church. Since the island ceased to be under secular jurisdiction, it was often used by those who had broken the law in Wrocław, as a place of sanctuary. An interesting indication of the special status of the island was a ban on wearing any headdress by men, effective even on Tumski Bridge beyond the border pole of this small "ecclesiastical nation" (the law also applied to royalty).

In 1503-1538 Nicolaus Copernicus was a canon of the collegiate chapter of the Holy Cross in the Cathedral Island.

Giacomo Casanova lived at the house of Father Bastiani on the island in 1766.

The old Odra riverbed was covered up in the 19th century, thus connecting Cathedral Island with mainland Wrocław.

== Gallery ==
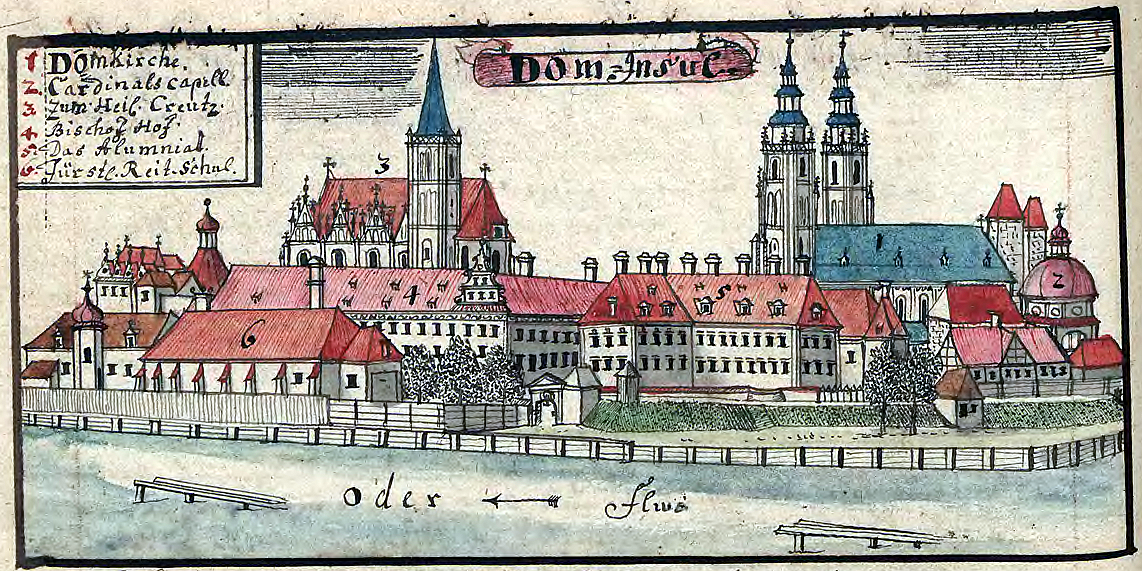
The Cathedral Island in the 18th century (by Friedrich Bernhard Werner)

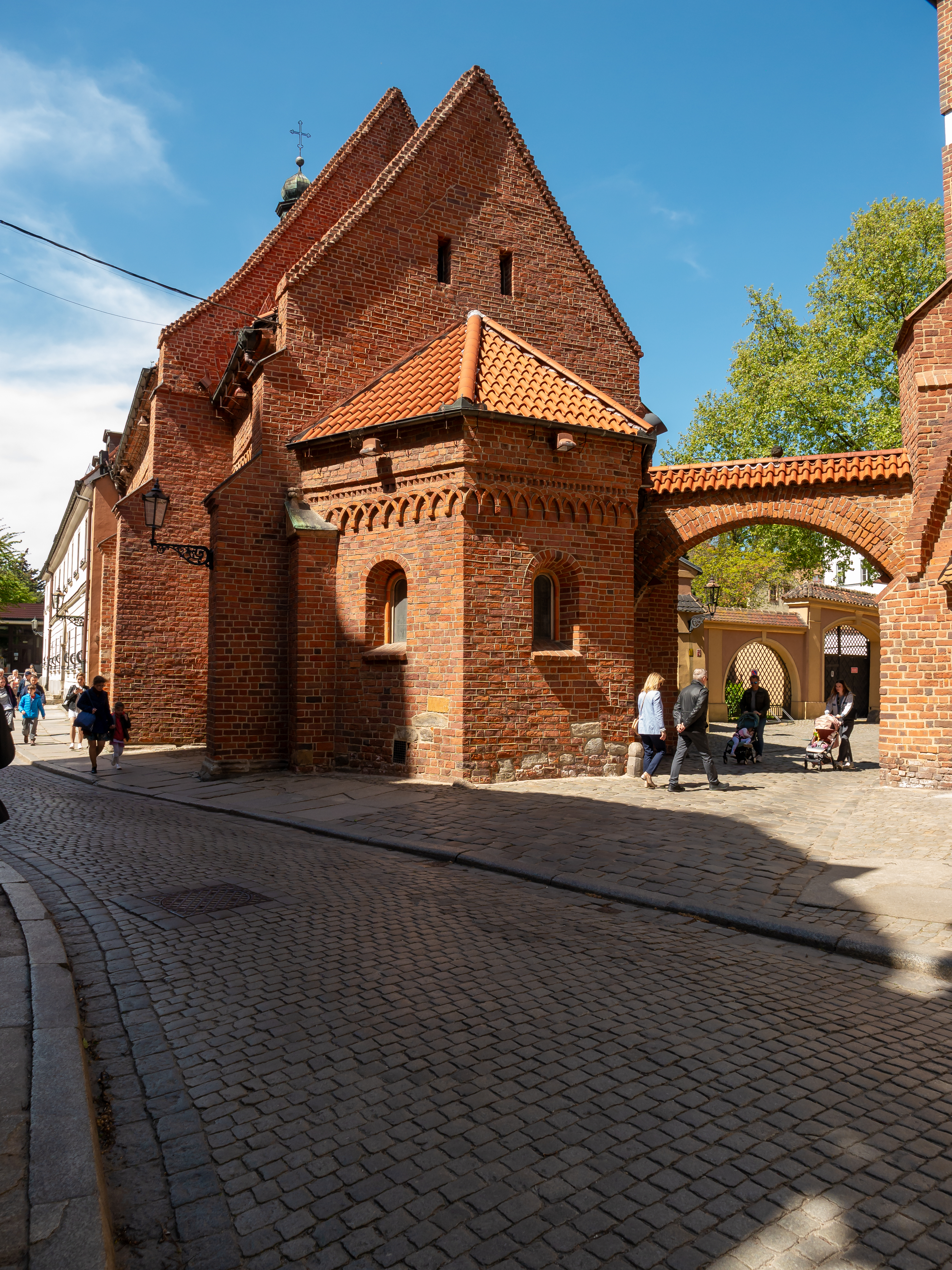
St. Giles Church, built in the 1220s

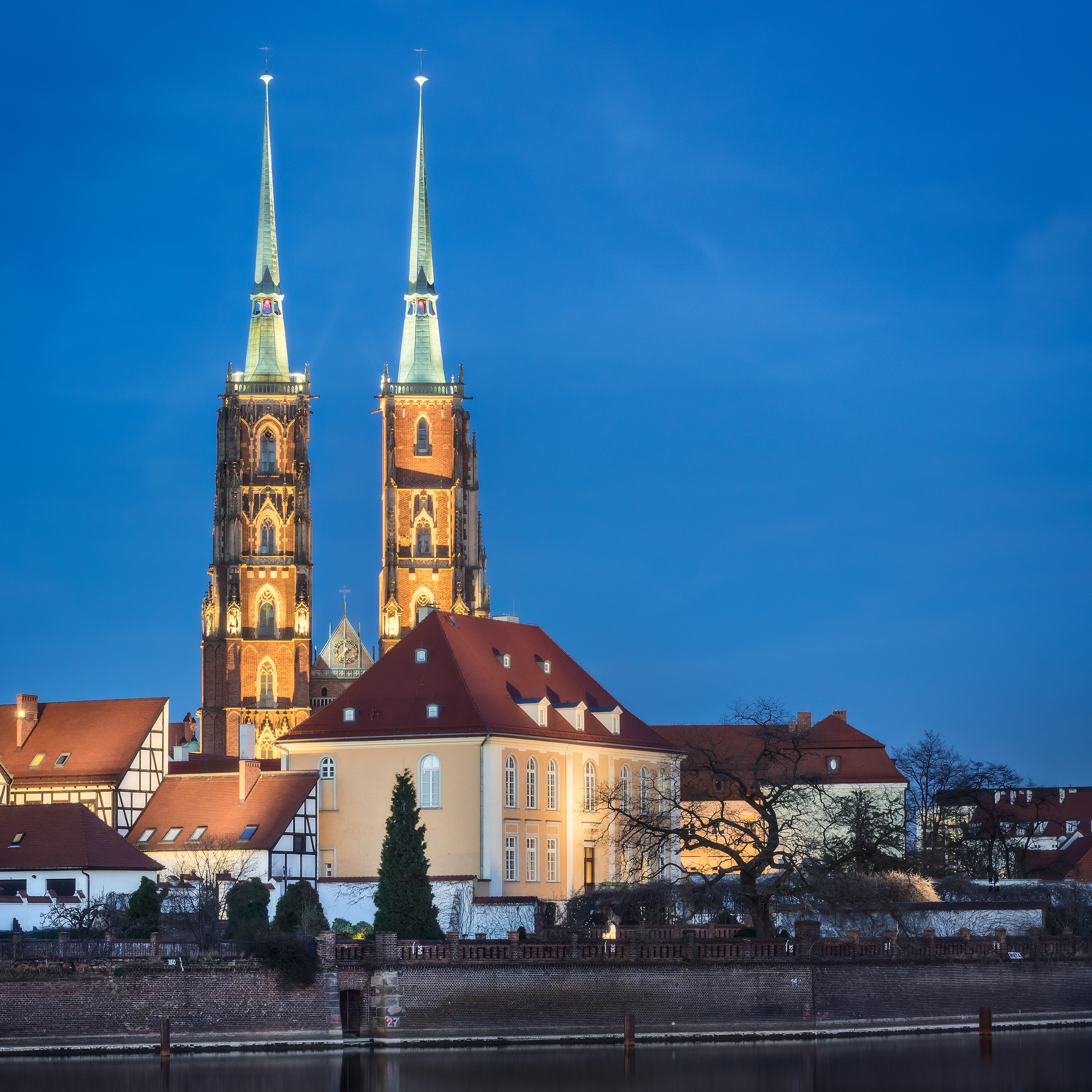
Wrocław Cathedral

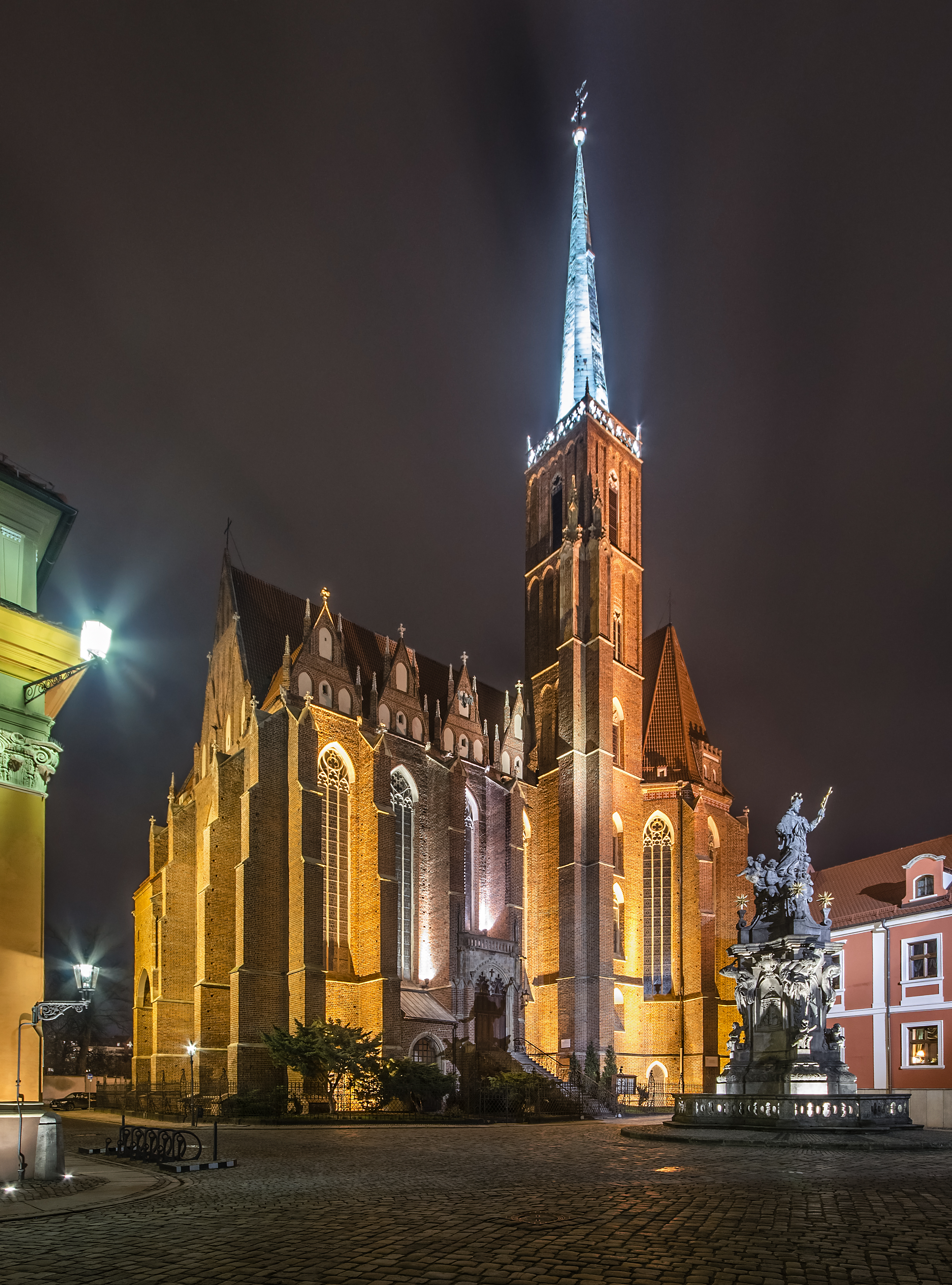
Collegiate Church of the Holy Cross and St. Bartholomew

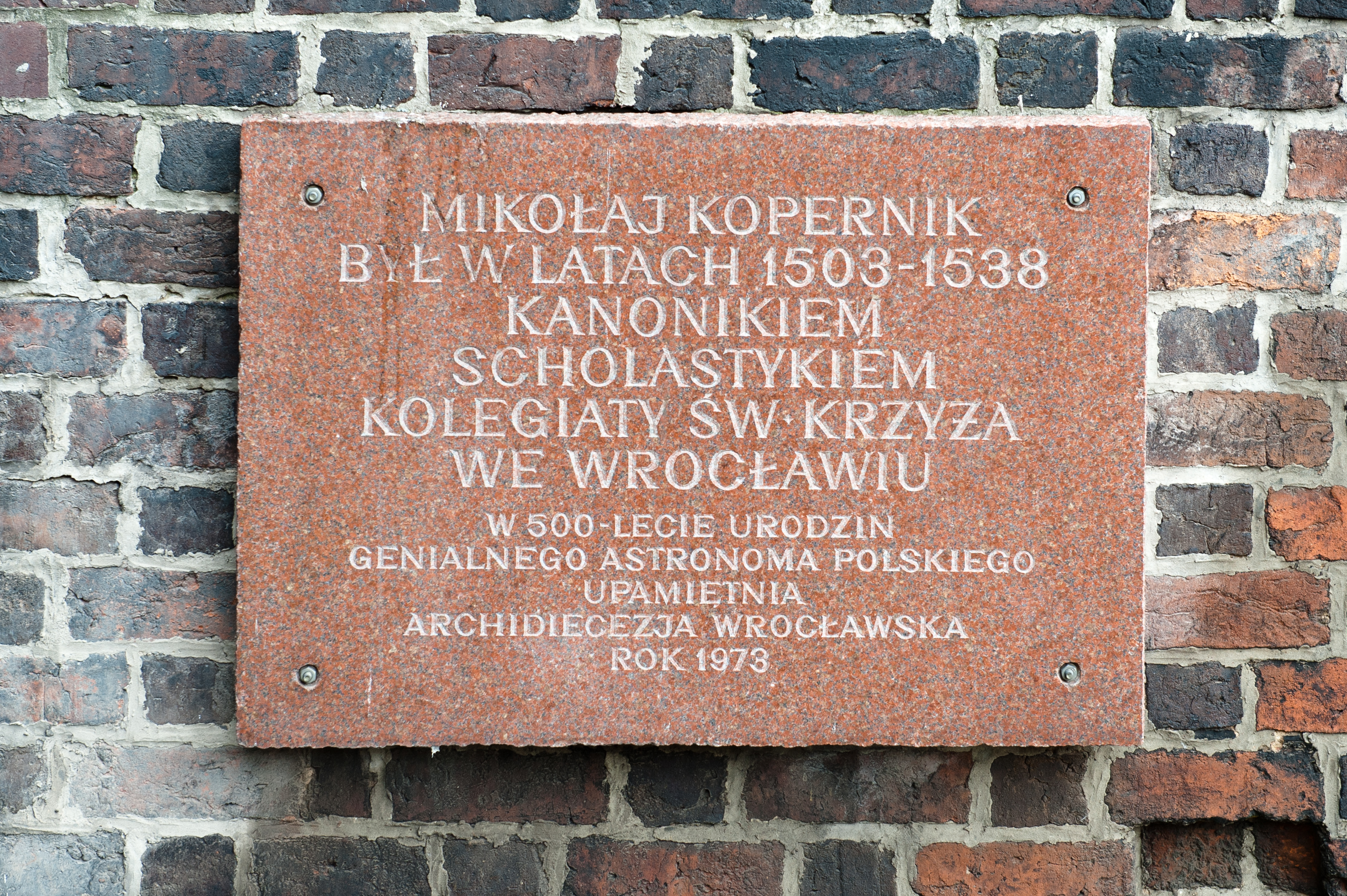
Memorial plaque to the Polish astronomer Nicolaus Copernicus

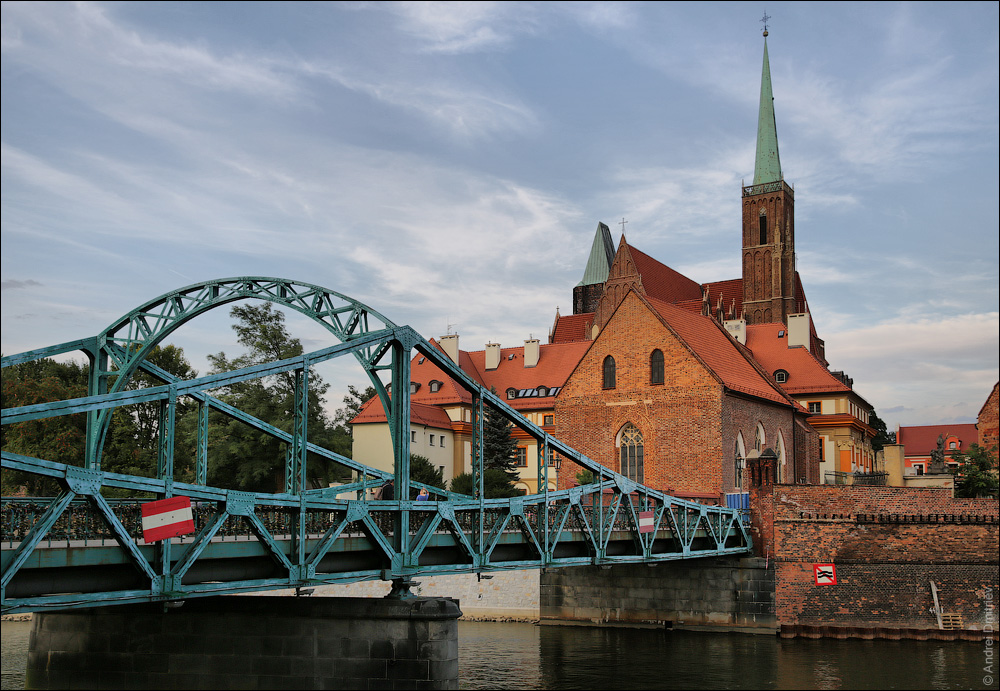
Tumski Bridge

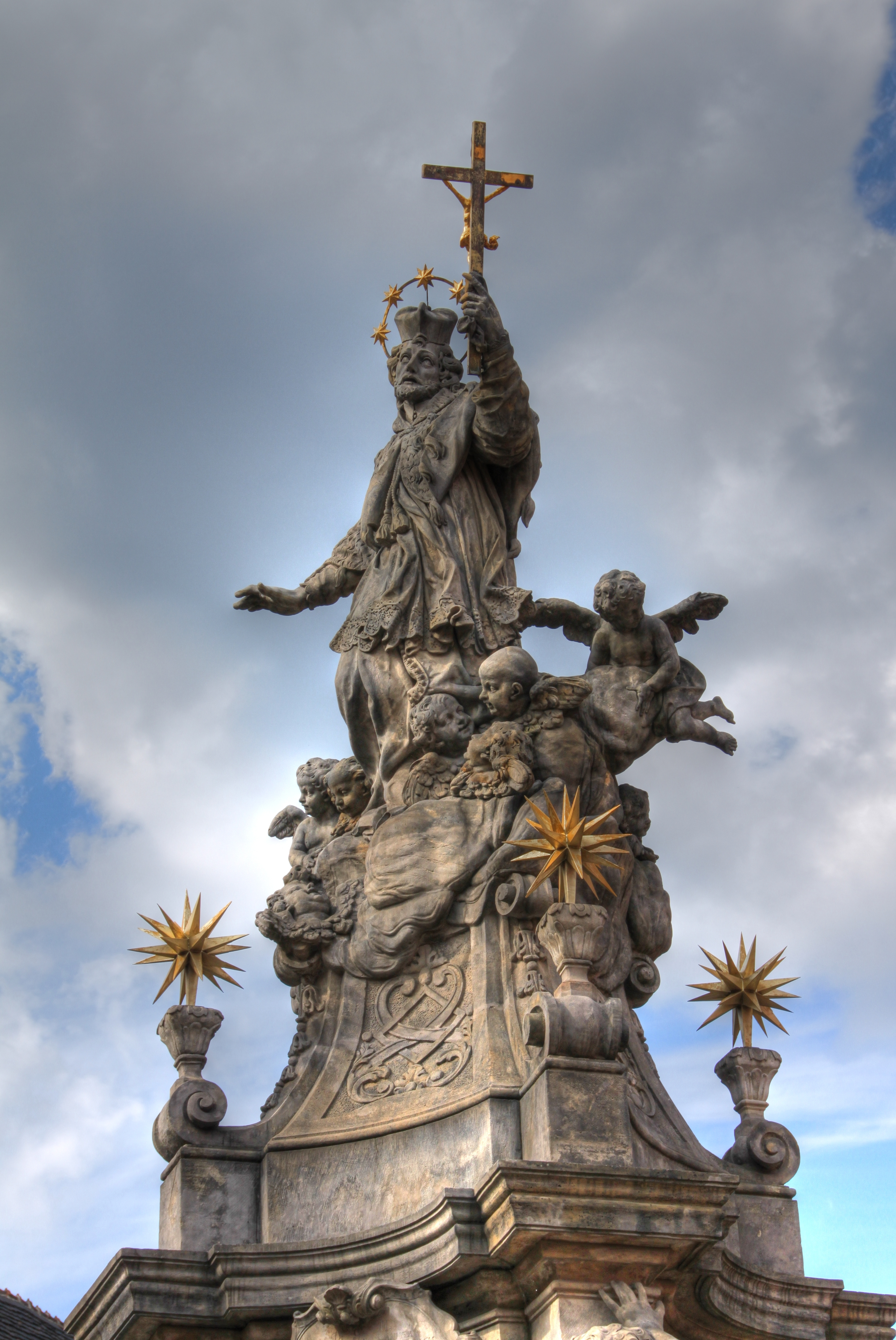
John of Nepomuk Monument

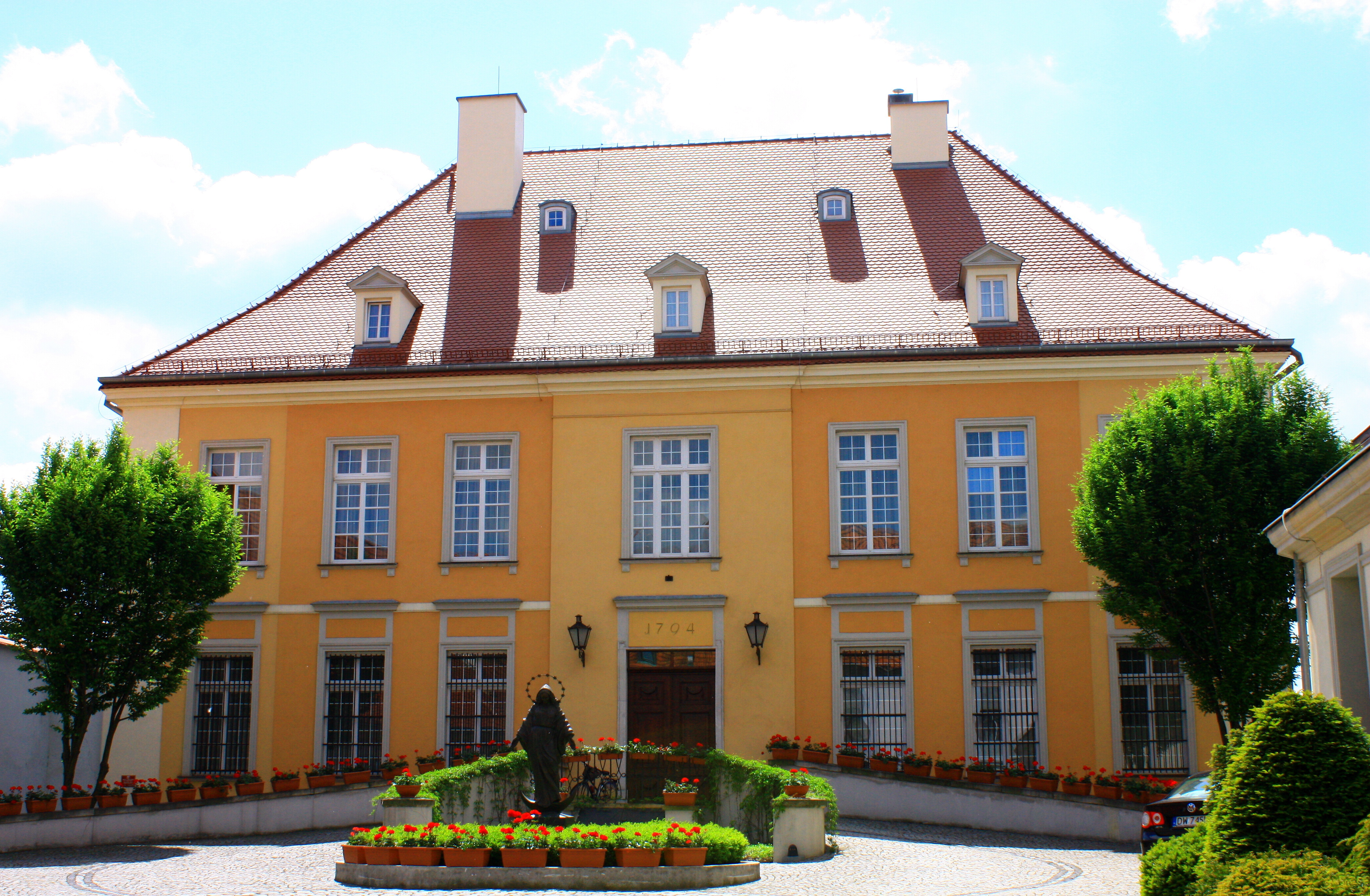
Archbishop's Palace

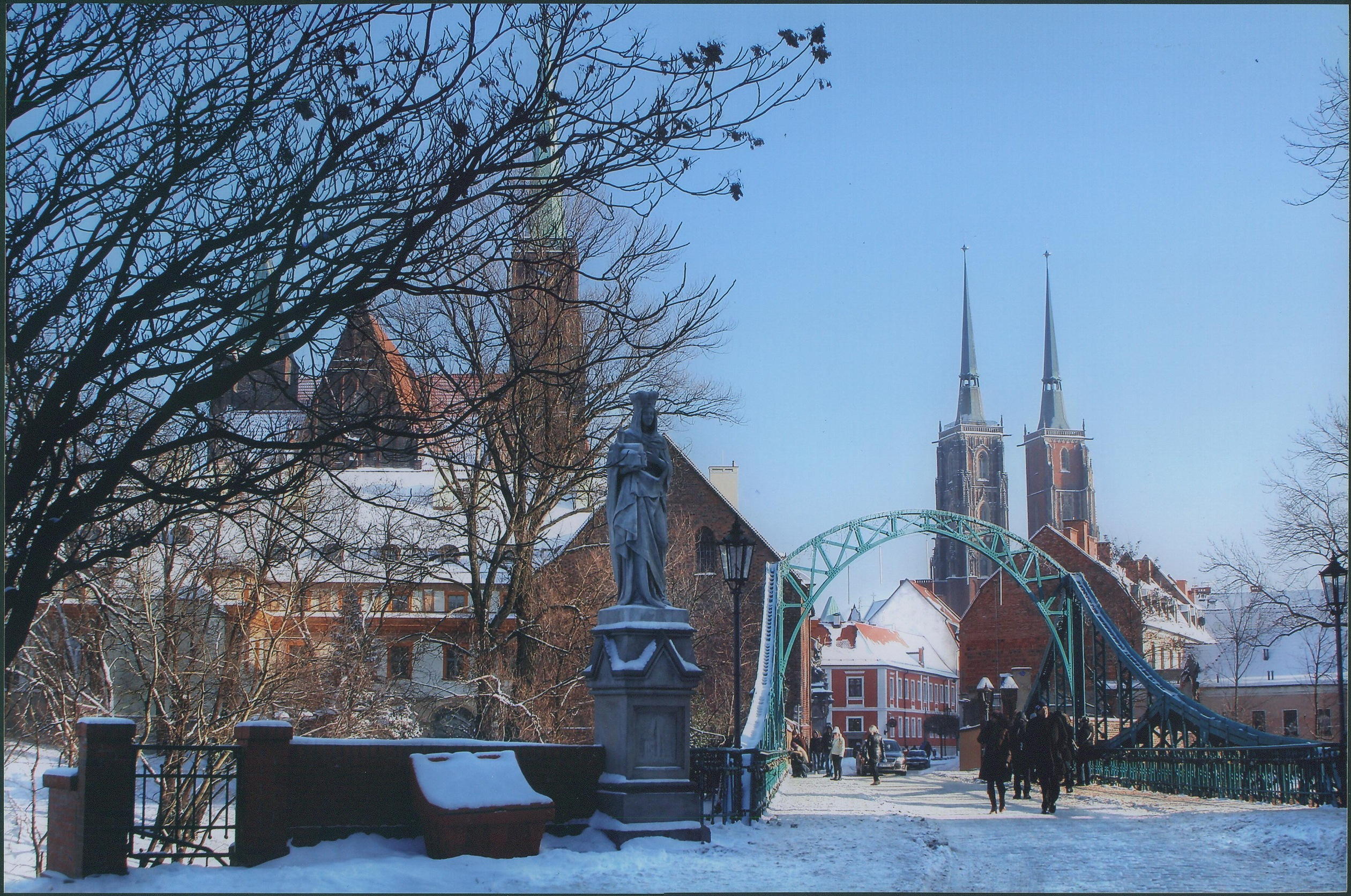
The Cathedral Island as seen from the Sand Island

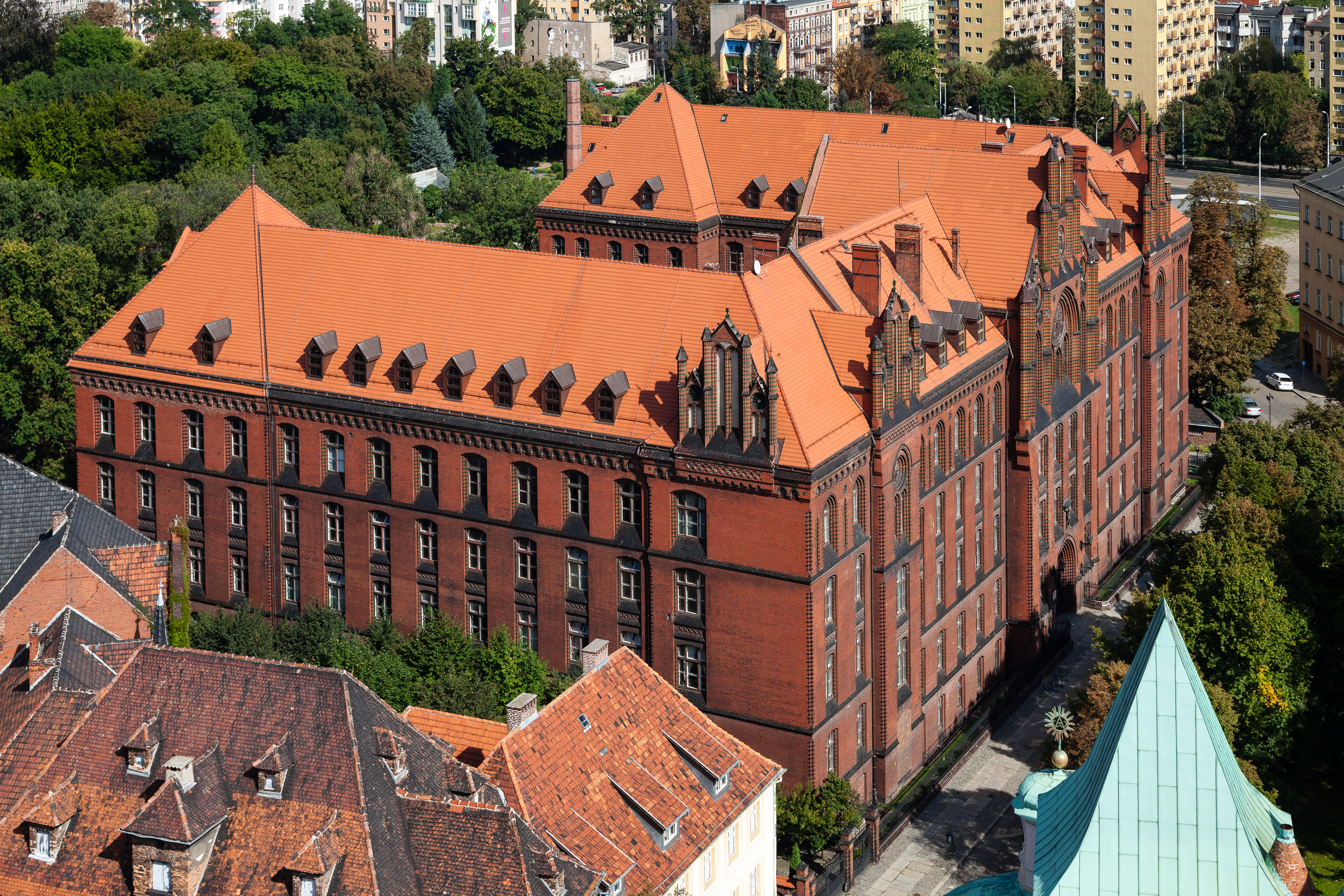
Wrocław Seminary, built in 1894

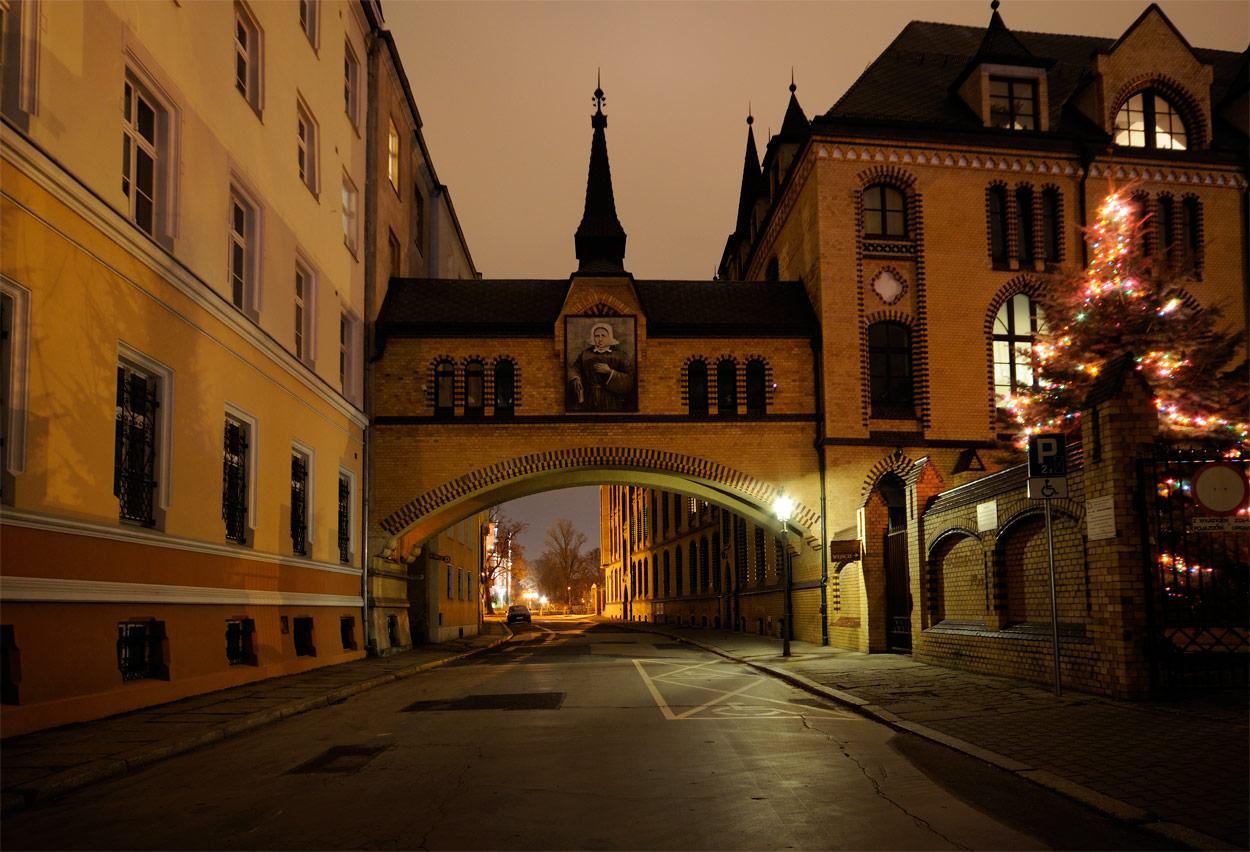
Monastery complex Sisters of Saint Elizabeth

== See also ==
- Domfreiheit
