= Church of St Mary on the Sand =

Church in Wroclaw, Poland

Coordinates: 51.1147°N 17.0411°E

- Kościół Najświętszej Marii Panny na Piasku
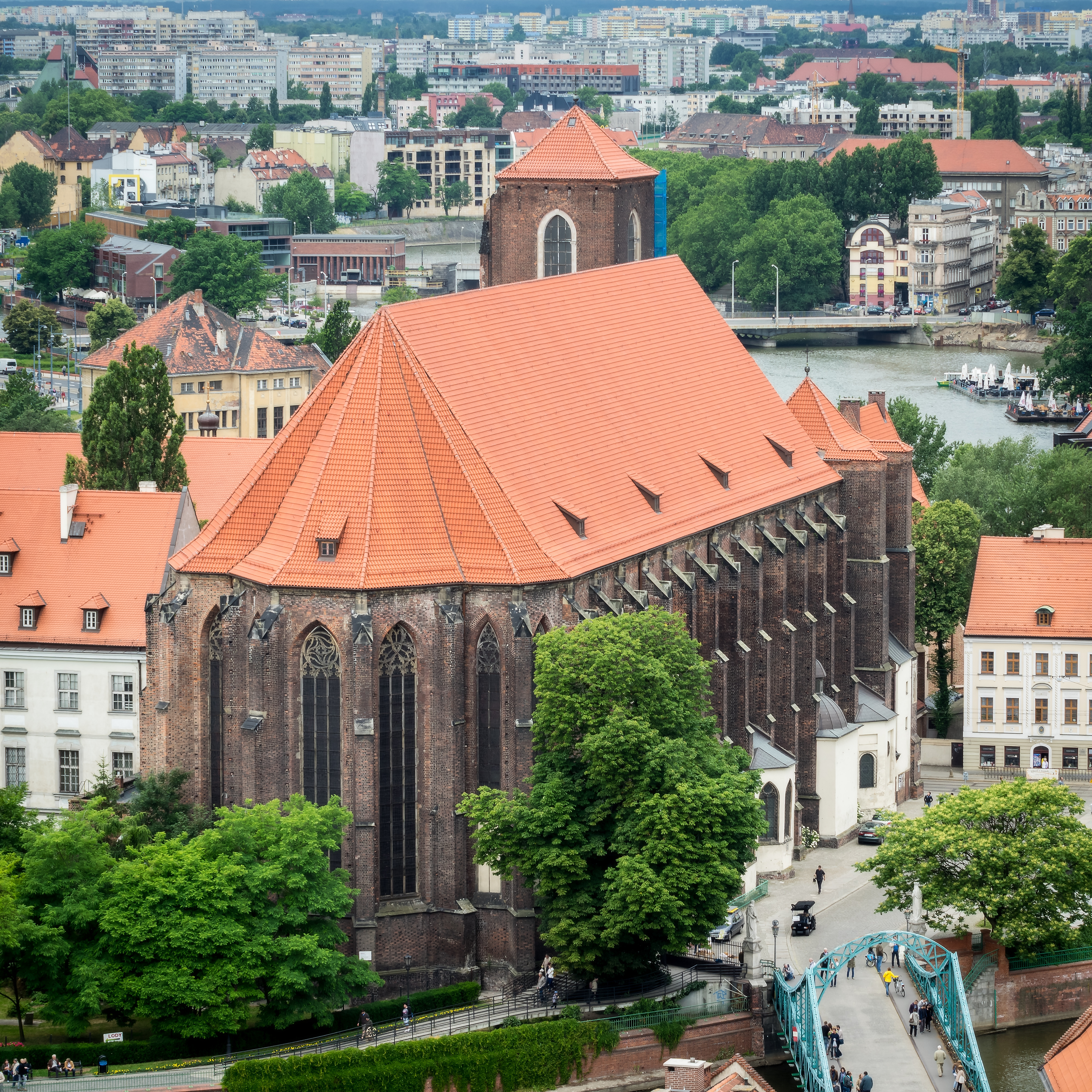

Religion
- Affiliation: Roman Catholic
- Province: Archdiocese of Wrocław

Location
- Location: Sand Island, Wrocław
- Interactive map of Church of St Mary on the Sand

Architecture
- Style: Gothic
- Completed: 1334–1430 (Gothic church); 1946–1948 and 1961–1963 (reconstruction)

Specifications
- Length: 78 m (256 ft)
- Width: 25 m (82 ft)
- Height (max): 41 m (135 ft)
- Materials: stone, brick

Website
- Kościół Najświętszej Maryi Panny na Piasku we Wrocławiu

Historic Monument of Poland
- Designated: 1994-09-08
- Part of: Wrocław – historic city center
- Reference no.: M.P. 1994 nr 50 poz. 425

The Church of St. Mary on the Sand (Polish: Kościół Najświętszej Marii Panny na Piasku, German: Kirche Unserer lieben Frau auf dem Sande, Sandkirche) is a Catholic church in Wrocław, in Silesia, located on the Sand Island, in the Oder River, in the heart of the city. Founded in the 12th century, it is one of the oldest Gothic churches in the country.

The Polish name is derived from its Latin equivalent, Sancta Maria in Arena, which later gave the entire island its name.

== History ==
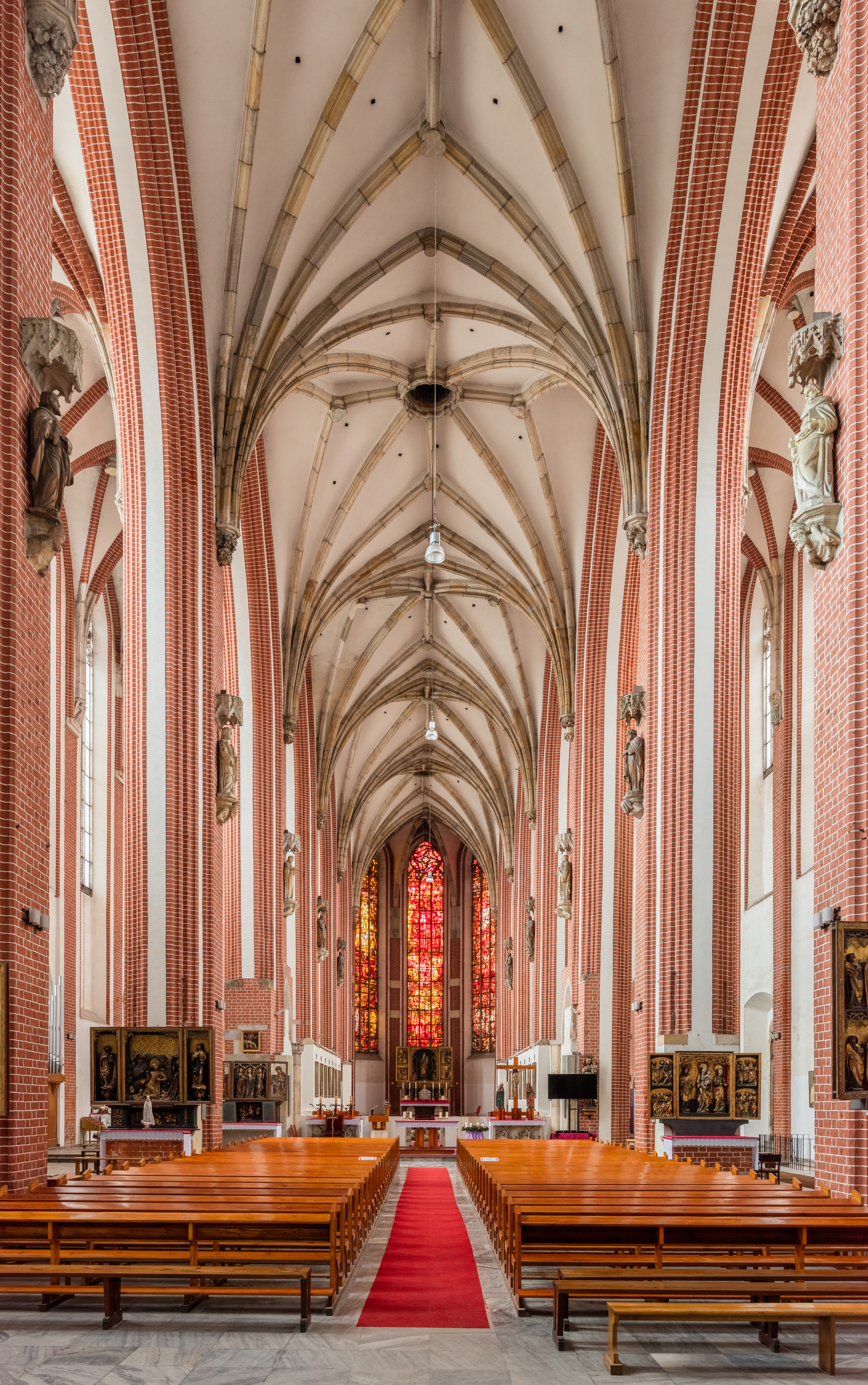
Main nave of the Virgin Mary church (2017)

At the end of the eleventh century the descendants of Count Palatine and the great Polish nobleman Piotr Włostowic allowed the construction of a Romanesque church on the island. This powerful family was involved in the evangelization of Silesia. It is dedicated to the Virgin Mary, patron saint of the governor's wife (statthalter), Maria Włast. The tympanum above the entrance portal shows a statue of the Virgin and Child with a small statue of the kneeling foundress, Maria Włast, holding her son in her arms next to it.

=== Gothic church ===
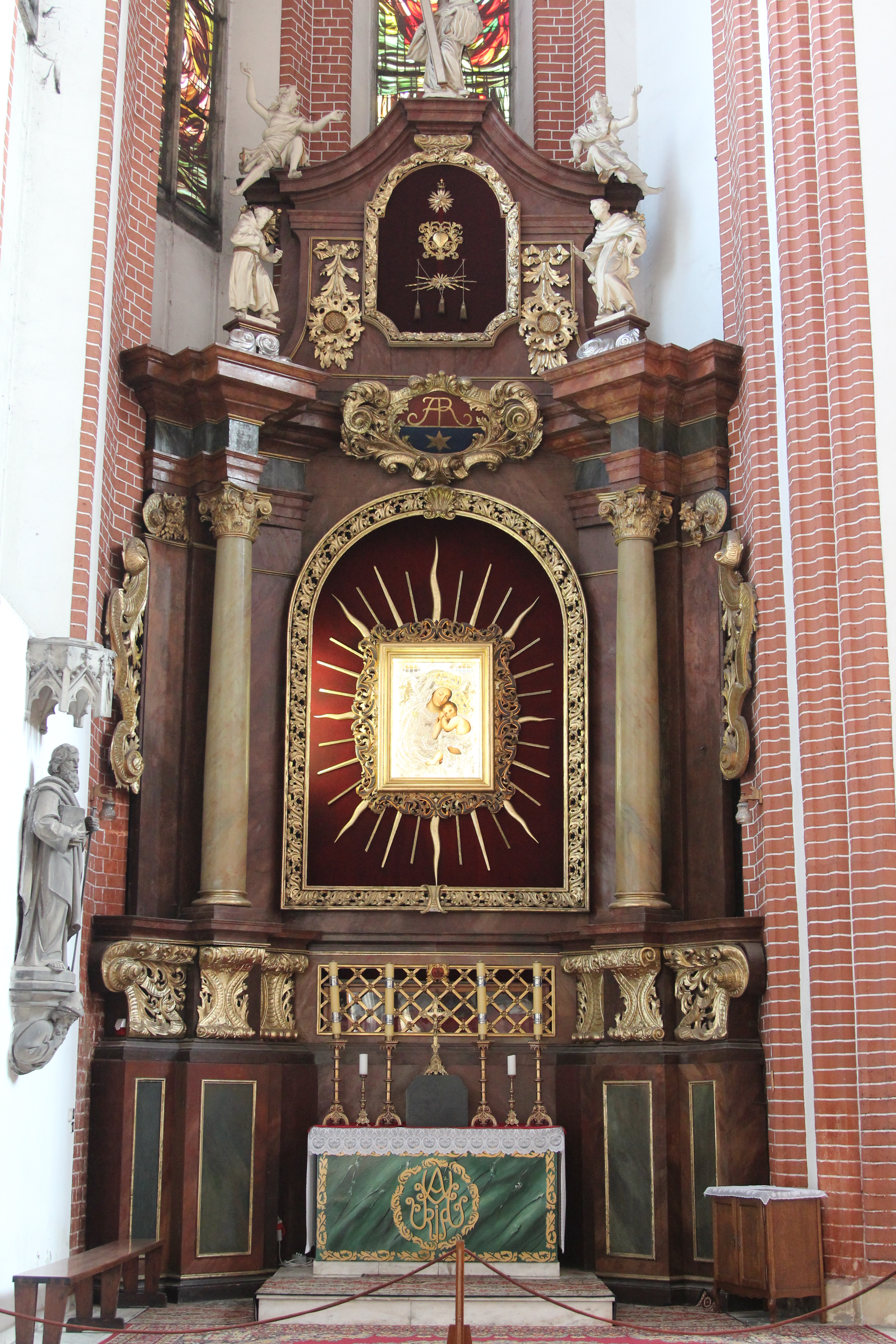
Altar of Virgin Mary of Mariampol and st. Victor from Rome

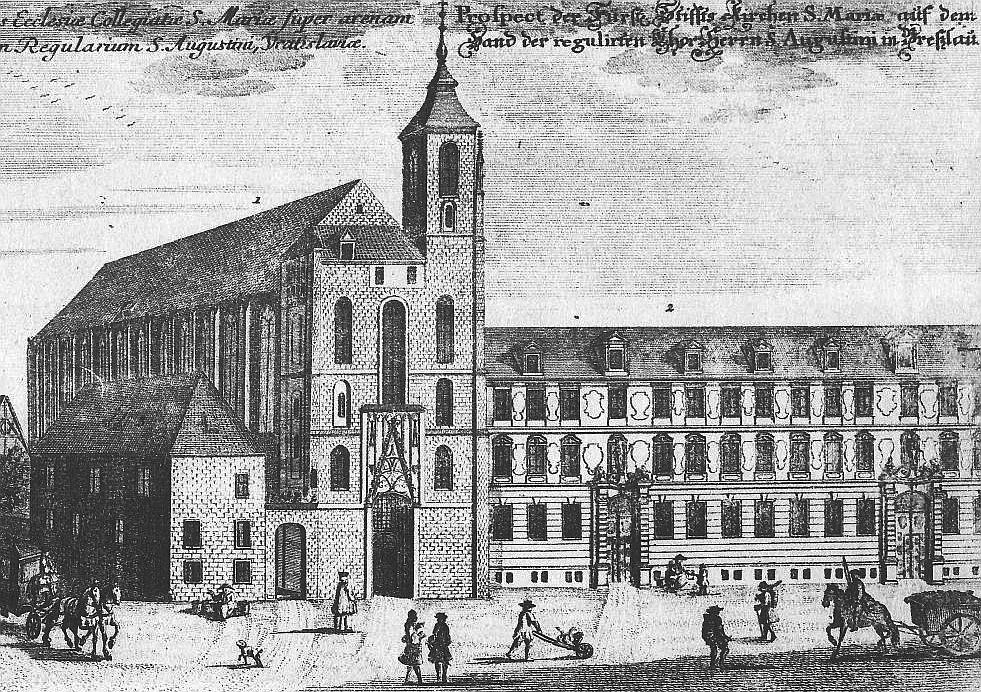
Illustration from 1736, picturing the church and adjustment Augustine monastery

The Romanesque church was demolished in the 14th century to make way for a larger Gothic church, built in brick between 1334 and 1430 according to the plans of the architect Master Peschel. It was supposed to have two towers, but the north tower was never completed. The nave, lit by huge windows, is 78 meters long. The Gothic vaults rise to 24 meters high. Additional work took place in the following centuries, including the construction of the Chapel of the Holy Cross by Antonio Coldin in 1666. It is the oldest baroque construction in the city. The church was sacked by Swedish troops in 1632 during the Thirty Years' War. A century later, lightning struck the south tower destroying its roof, while a few days earlier the new 4.7 ton bell had just been blessed. During the Seven Years' War, the Prussians used the church as an ammunition depot.

=== Second World War ===
Hitler made Breslau a fortified city in 1944. When the Soviet troops advanced to the west in 1945, the church and the buildings served as headquarters for the German army, which was conscious of fighting a dead-end battle. General Hermann von Niehoff commanded the 371st Infantry Division. During the fighting, most of the city's historical monuments were destroyed or severely damaged. The church also burned down. The baroque interior disappeared completely, the paintings of Michael Willmann, the baroque pulpit by Franz Joseph Mangoldt, the organ are destroyed by the flames.

A program of restoration of the church, of which only the walls were still standing, began in 1946. The vaults were rebuilt. A Virgin of the 16th century is offered to the church by the Catholics of Mariampol in Bessarabia, which has become Ukrainian. The interior of the church is composed of surviving elements from other destroyed churches in the city and the diocesan museum. Only the tympanum and the baptistery are original. Warsaw-based artist Teresa Reklewska composed in 1968 the new modern stained glass windows depicting scenes from the New Testament.

== Literature ==
- Antkowiak Z., Kościoły Wrocławia, Wrocław: Muzeum Archidiecezjalne we Wrocławiu, 1991, ISBN 83-900018-1-1, OCLC 750827897.
- Bogusław Czechowicz, Dawny kościół Kanoników Regularnych pw. Najświętszej Panny Marii (...) (w:) Jan Harasimowicz (red.), Atlas architektury Wrocławia. Tom I. Budowle sakralne, Świeckie budowle publiczne, Wrocław, Wydawnictwo Dolnośląskie, 1997, ISBN 83-7023-592-1.
- Edmund Małachowicz, Wrocław na wyspach. Rozwój urbanistyczny i architektoniczny, Wrocław, ZNiO-Wydawnictwo, 1987, ISBN 83-04-02834-4.
