= Sts. Cyril and Methodius Church (Wrocław) =

Church building in Wrocław, Poland

Church of Sts. Cyril and Methodius
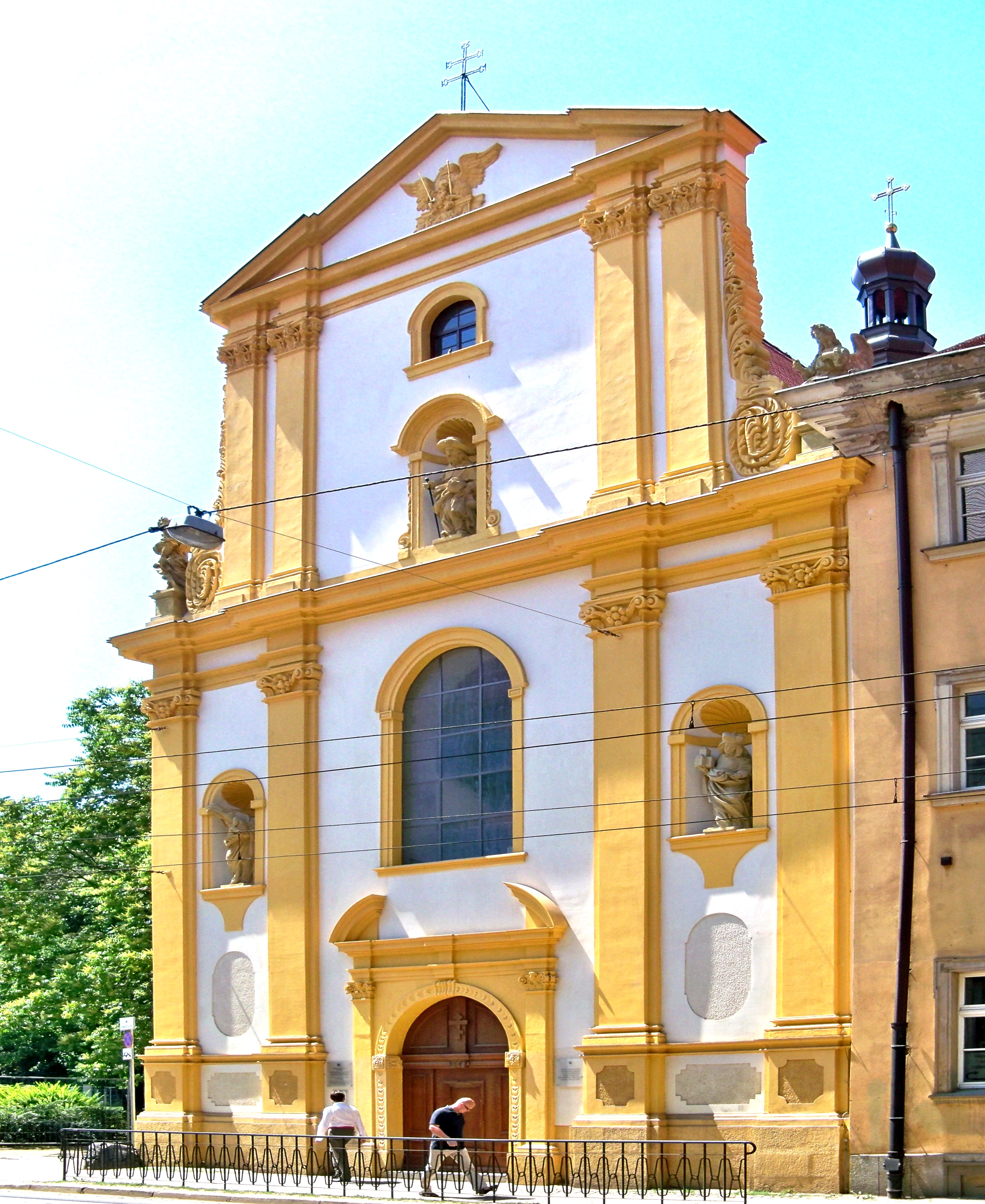

- Location: Wrocław
- Country: Poland
- Denomination: Orthodox

History
- Status: Parish church

Architecture
- Functional status: Active
- Style: Baroque
- Completed: 1690

Historic Monument of Poland
- Designated: 1994-09-08
- Part of: Wrocław – historic city center
- Reference no.: M.P. 1994 nr 50 poz. 425

The Church of Sts. Cyril and Methodius (until 1945 St. Anne's Church) is an orthodox church in Wrocław, Poland. It is located on the Sand Island.

== History ==
The original church of St. Anne was built between 1686 and 1690 for the Augustinian nuns in baroque style. In the Middle Ages, a chapel dedicated to St. Joseph stood on the site. This was destroyed at the beginning of the 17th century.

After the secularization in 1810, the church was transferred to the Catholic seminary. Between 1919 and 1921 the church served the Polish minority of the town as a Catholic church. Later, the Church of St. Anne went to the Old Catholic Church.

During the Second World War, the church was used to store almost half a million books from the library of the University of Breslau. During the Siege of Breslau, the church was badly destroyed and burned out completely, along with the books. After the war, minor security measures were initially implemented.

In 1970, the building went to the city's Orthodox community. It was rebuilt and could be used again in 1976 as the first orthodox church of the city.
