= Sand Island, Wrocław =

Island in Wrocław, Poland

Sand Island Polish: Wyspa Piasek
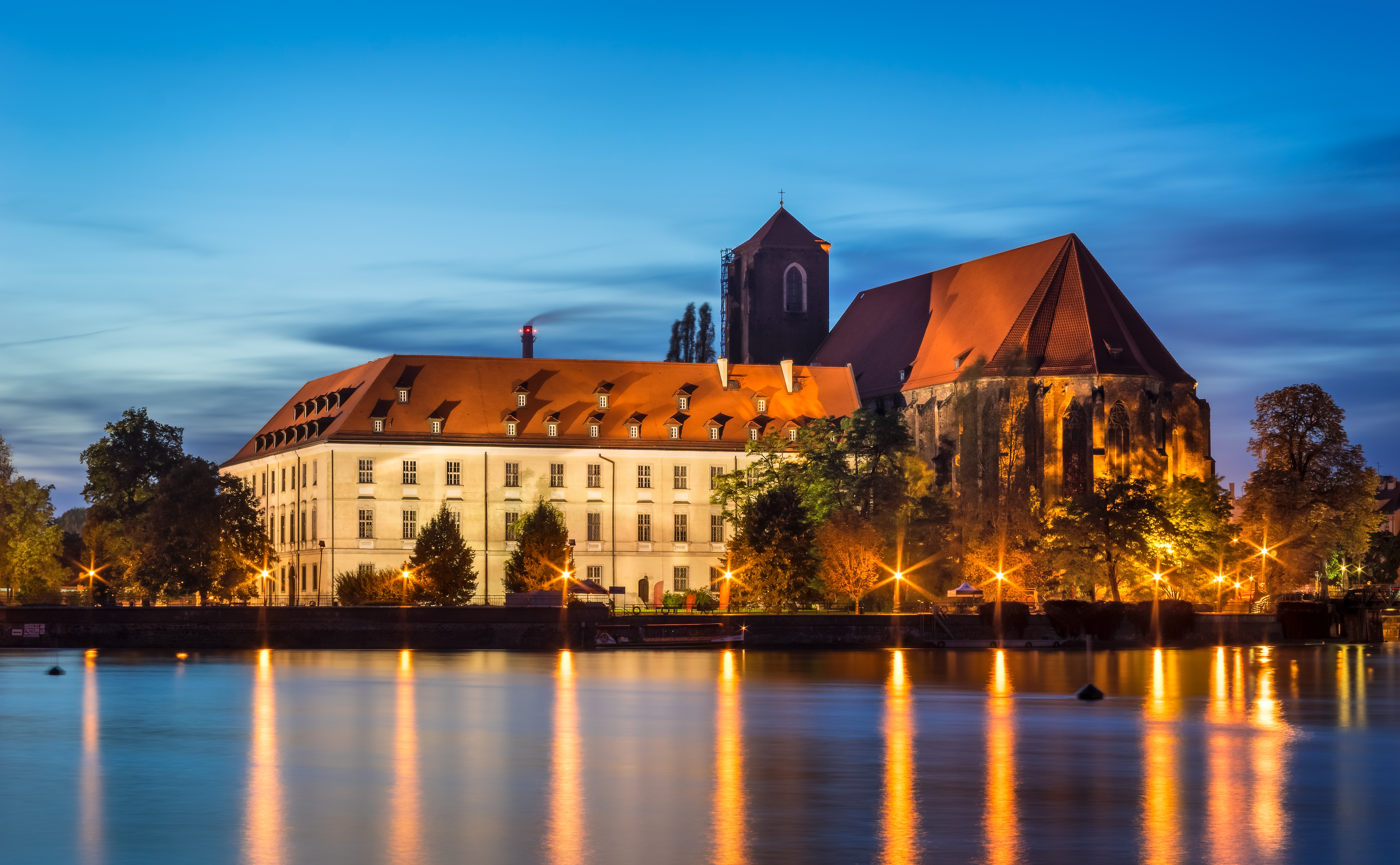
- View of the island and the Church of St Mary at dusk

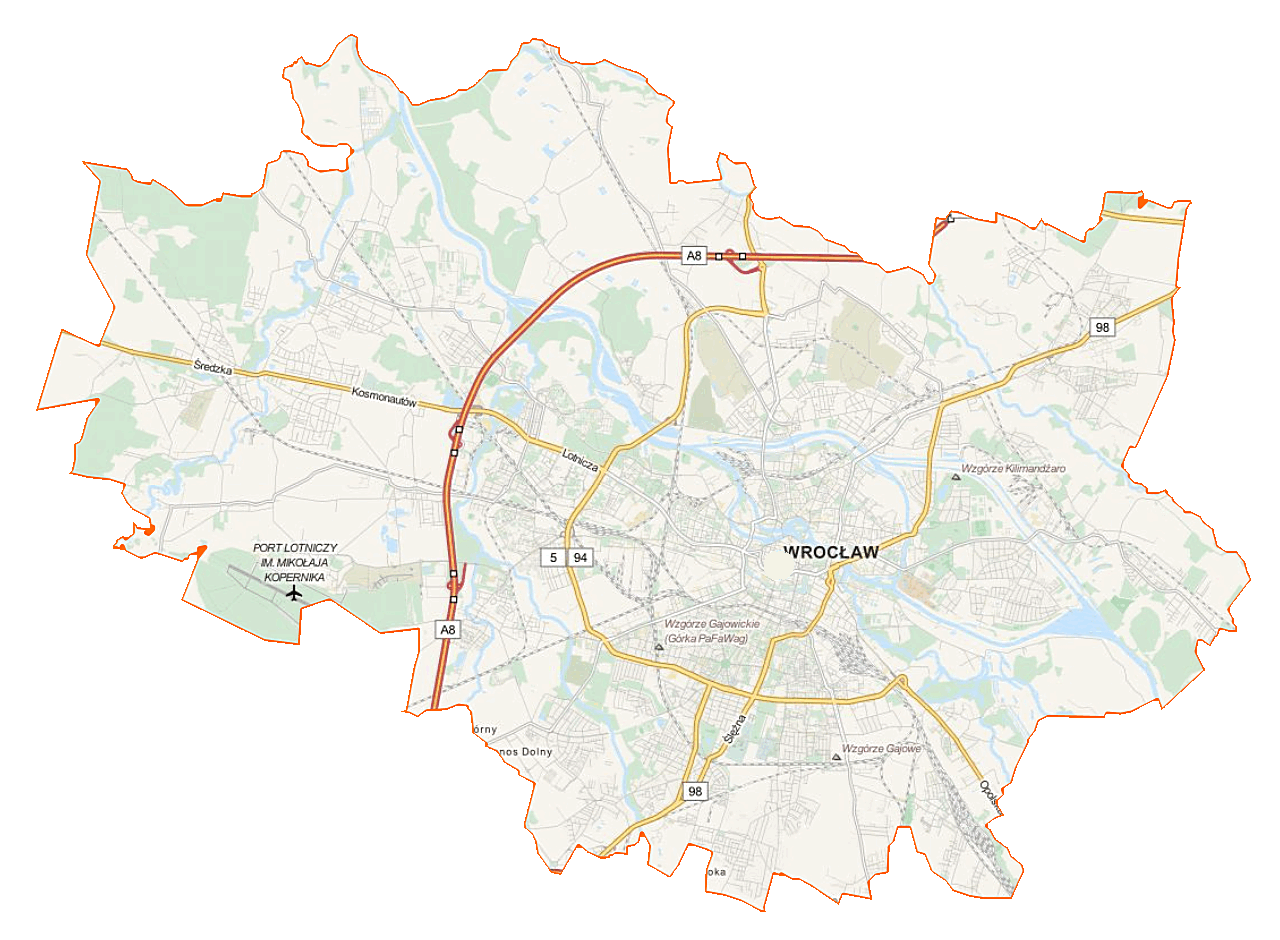
- Location within Wrocław

Geography
- Location: Wrocław, Poland
- Coordinates: 51°06′53″N 17°02′26″E
- Length: 0.3 km (0.19 mi)
- Width: 0.2 km (0.12 mi)

Administration
- Poland

Historic Monument of Poland
- Designated: 1994-09-08
- Part of: Wrocław – historic city center
- Reference no.: M.P. 1994 nr 50 poz. 425

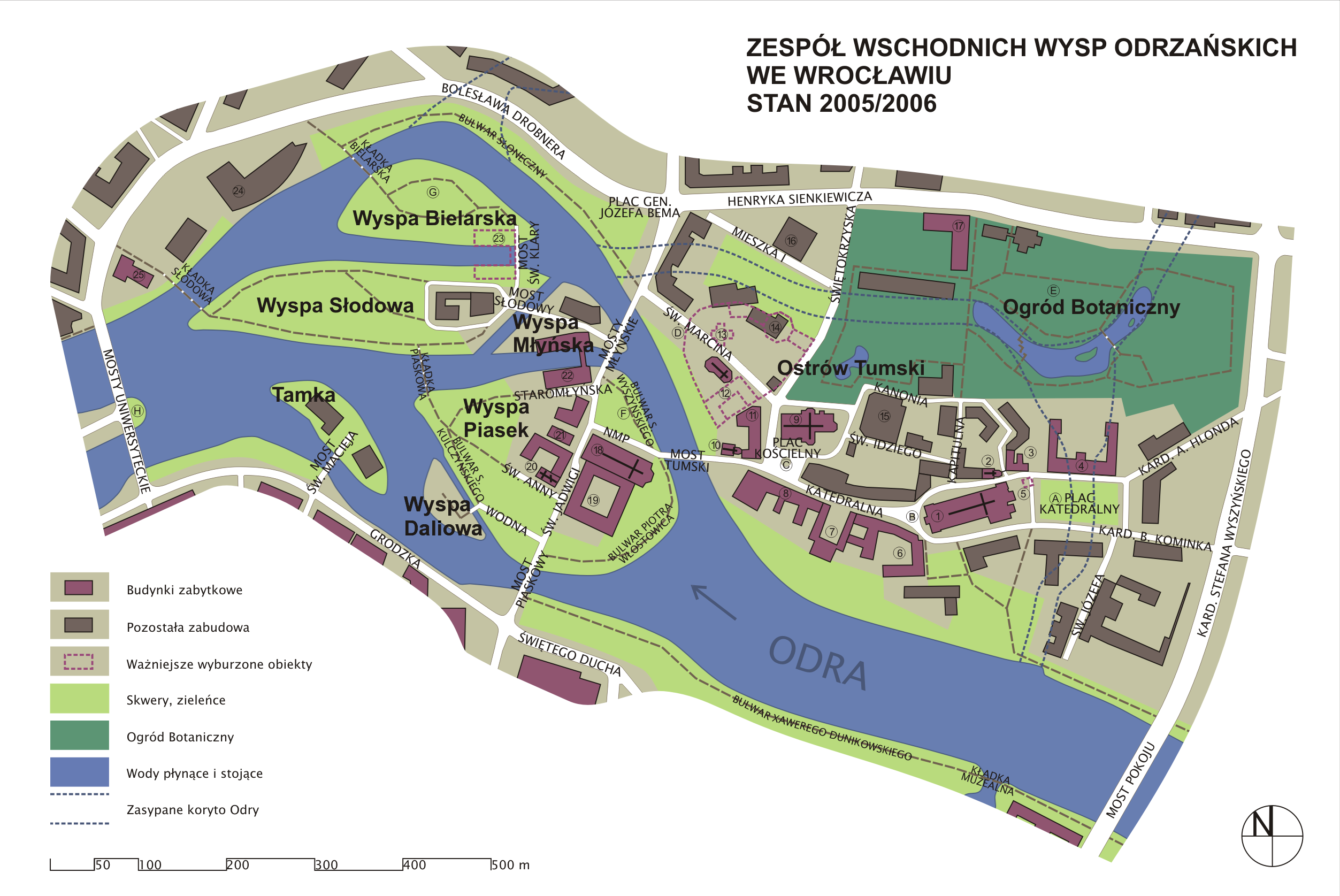
Islands in Wrocław

The Sand Island (Polish: Wyspa Piasek, [ˈvɨspa ˈpjasɛk], German: Sandinsel, [ˈzantɪnzəl]) in Wrocław is one of several islands in the Oder within the Old Town and Downtown Water Junction. The island is connected to mainland Wrocław by the Piasek Bridge, the Młyński Bridge, and Tumski Bridge.

== Background ==
The island is located in the city center, near the Cathedral Island. Its area is about five hectares.

Its name derives from the Church of St Mary on the Sand, which is located on it. The island is also home to St. Anne's cemetery chapel, the Augustinian nunnery complex and a monument to Cardinal Kominek. Two pedestrian promenades are located on the edge of the island. These are the Boulevard of Stanisław Kulczyński and the Boulevard of Piotr Włostowic.

== See also ==
- Church of St Mary on the Sand
- St. Cyril and Methodius Church (Wrocław)
