= Tumski Bridge =

Bridge in Wrocław, Poland

Tumski Bridge Most Tumski
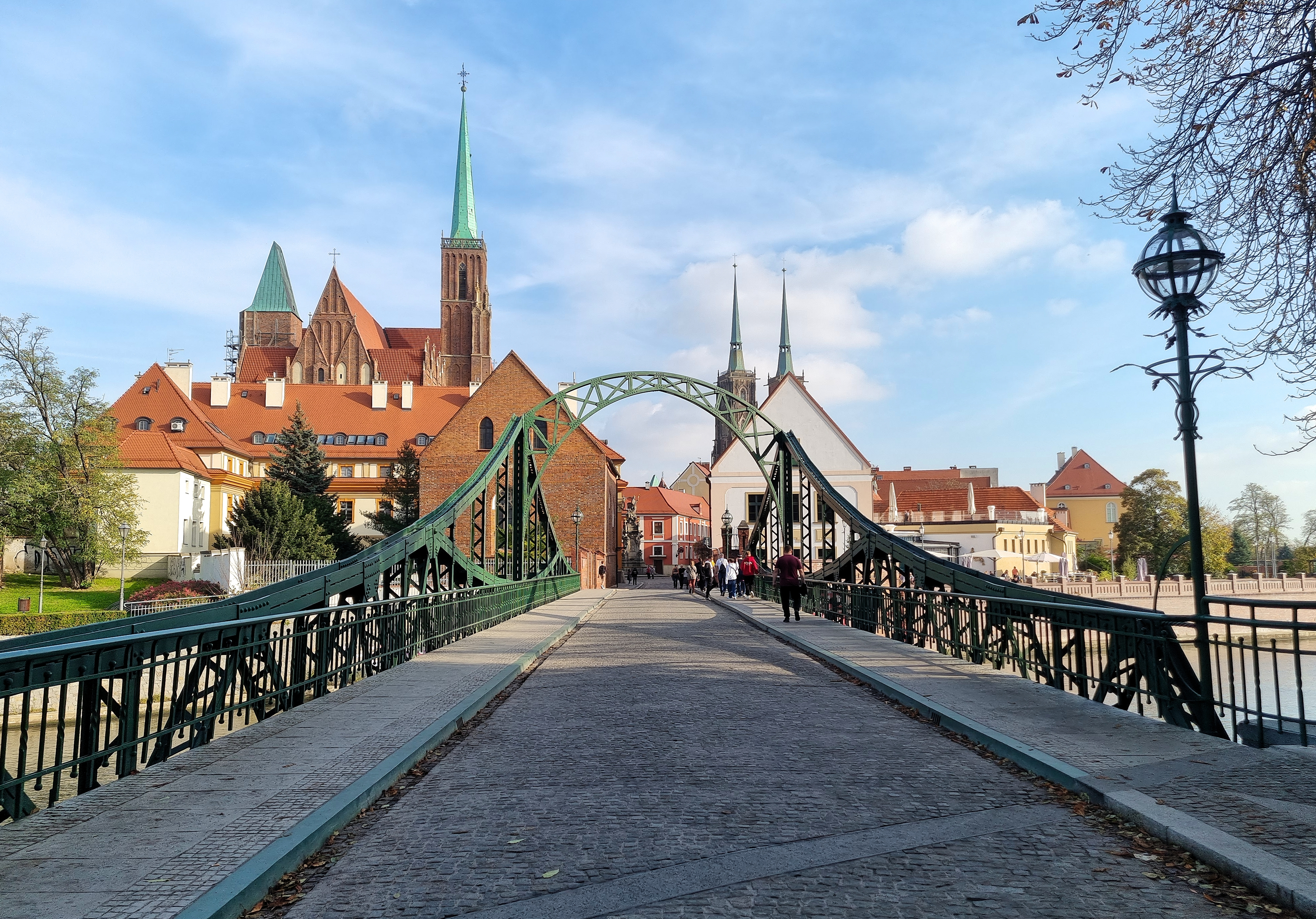
- Coordinates: 51°07′N 17°02′E
- Crosses: Oder
- Locale: Wrocław, Poland

History
- Built: 1889

Historic Monument of Poland
- Designated: 1994-09-08
- Part of: Wrocław – historic city center
- Reference no.: M.P. 1994 nr 50 poz. 425

Location
- Interactive map of Tumski Bridge

The Tumski Bridge (Polish: Most Tumski [mɔst ˈtumski]; German: Dombrücke [ˈdoːmbʁʏkə]; lit. 'Cathedral Bridge') is a steel bridge over the northern branch of the Oder in Wrocław. Constructed in 1889, it replaced an old wooden bridge to connect the Cathedral Island with the Sand Island. The bridge is open to pedestrians only.

Informally known as the Bridge of Lovers or the Bridge of Love, couples in love once pinned padlocks with their names on it.

== History ==
The bridge was built in 1889. In 1976, the bridge was entered in the register of historical monuments.

Since 2009, couples would attach padlocks to the Tumski Bridge as a symbol of their love. The keys to these padlocks were then thrown into the Oder. Due to the extensive renovation of the bridge and the need to avoid adding additional weight to the bridge, this practice was prohibited.

In 2019, the bridge was renovated. Prior to the renovation, thousands of padlocks were removed, weighing several tons in total. Any new padlocks that are added to the bridge are regularly removed by city services.
