= Collegiate Church of the Holy Cross and St. Bartholomew, Wrocław =

Collegiate Church of the Holy Cross and St. Bartholomew
- Kolegiata Świętego Krzyża i św. Bartłomieja
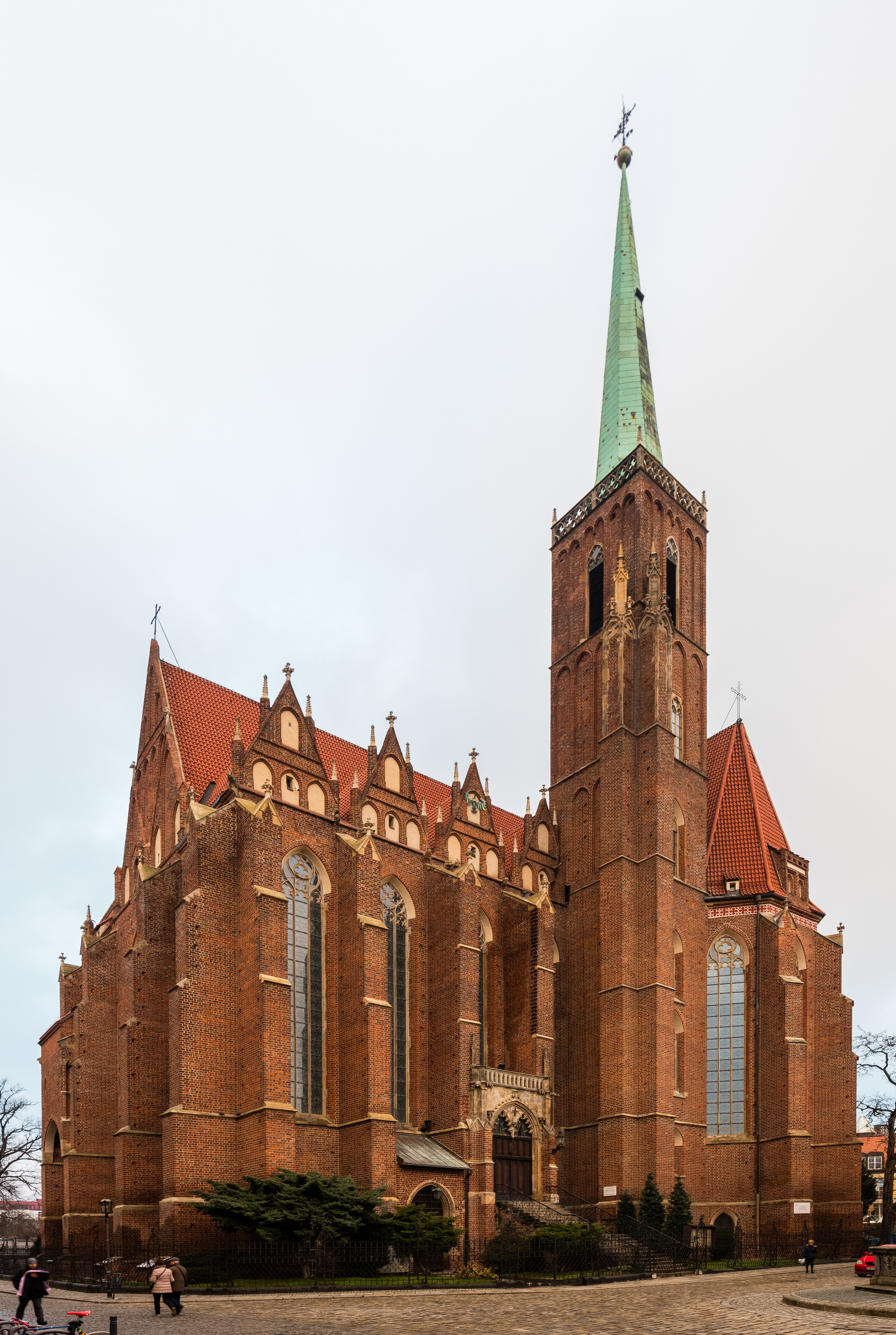

- Location within Poland
- 51.1150°N 17.0439°E
- Location: Wrocław
- Country: Poland
- Language: Polish
- Denomination: Catholic

History
- Status: Collegiate church
- Founded: 1288
- Founder: Henryk IV Probus
- Dedication: Holy Cross and Bartholomew the Apostle
- Consecrated: 1295

Architecture
- Functional status: Active
- Heritage designation: Historic Monument of Poland
- Designated: 8 September 1994
- Style: Gothic

Administration
- Archdiocese: Wrocław

Collegiate Church of the Holy Cross and St. Bartholomew (Polish: Kolegiata Świętego Krzyża i św. Bartłomieja) in Wrocław, Poland, is a two-storey brick Gothic collegiate church on the Ostrów Tumski (Cathedral Island), considered the second most important Roman Catholic church in Wrocław. It is one of the historic burial sites of Polish monarchs.

Along with the Old Town of Wrocław, it is listed as a Historic Monument of Poland.

== History ==
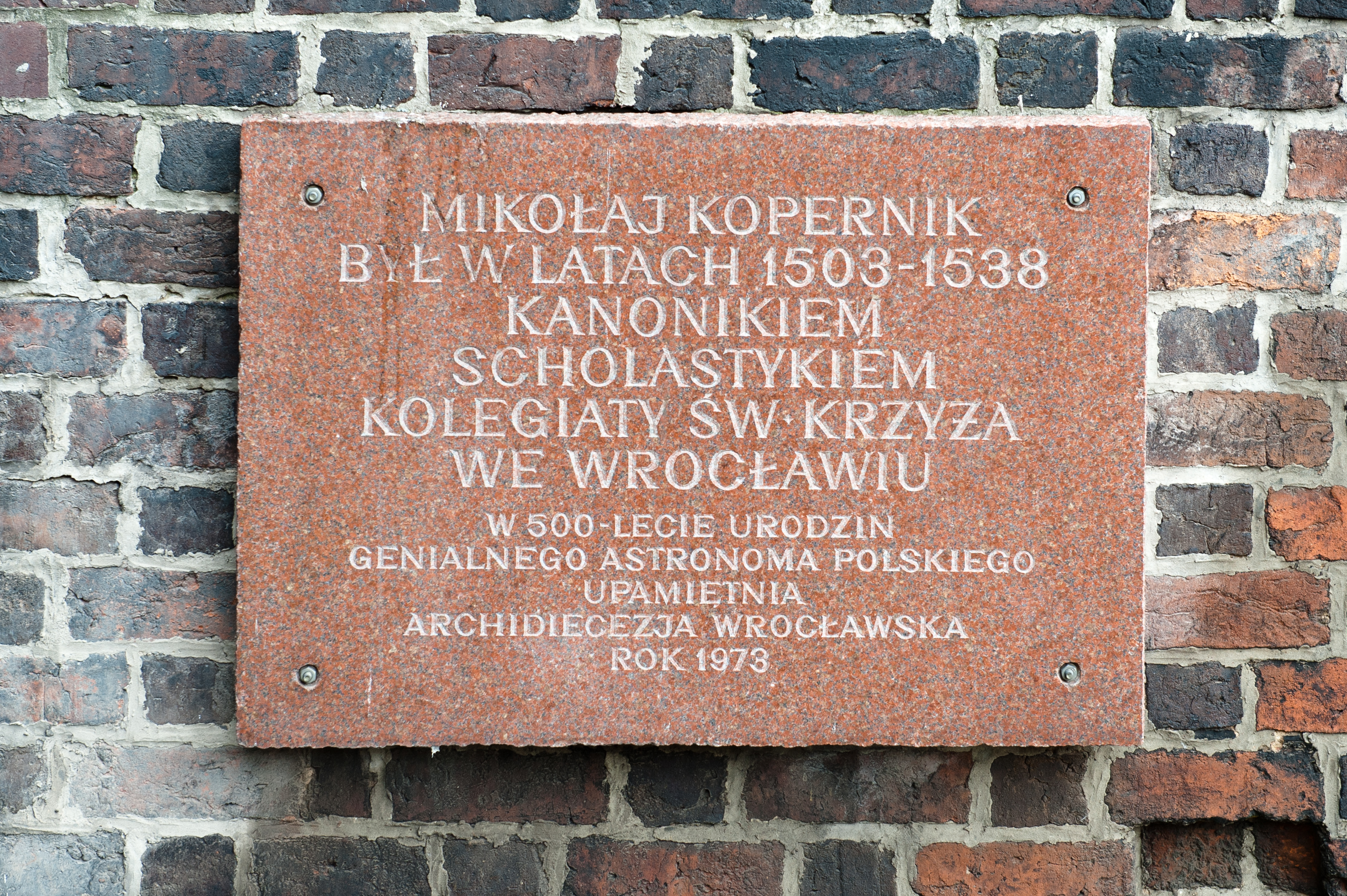
Memorial plaque to Nicolaus Copernicus

The church was founded in 1288 by Polish monarch Henryk IV Probus, who was eventually buried in the church after his death in 1290, when the church was still under construction. Construction was continued by, among others, bishop Nanker and parish priest Jan Stanko. The upper church (Holy Cross Church) contains an epitaph of bishop Nanker. 15h-century Polish chronicler Jan Długosz described the church as "beautiful and magnificent" following his visits in Wrocław. From 1502 to 1538 renown astronomer Nicolaus Copernicus was a member of the collegiate chapter. In 1821 Polish poet Julian Ursyn Niemcewicz listened to a Polish sermon in the church. After World War II, the lower church (St. Bartholomew Church) was used by ethnic Germans until 1956 and later by the Ukrainian Greek Catholic Church until 1997.

== Sources ==
- Czechowicz, Bogusław (2021). "Sources and Ways of Wrocław's Promotion in the Structures of the Bohemian Crown in the Luxembourg Era: Polemic Recapitulation". The City and History. 10 (2): 6–36. doi:10.33542/CAH2021-2-01.
