= Weinhaus Rheingold =

Former large restaurant in Berlin, Germany

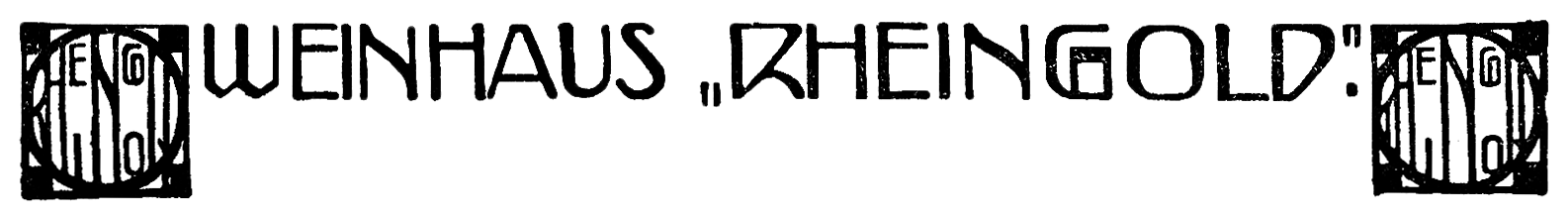

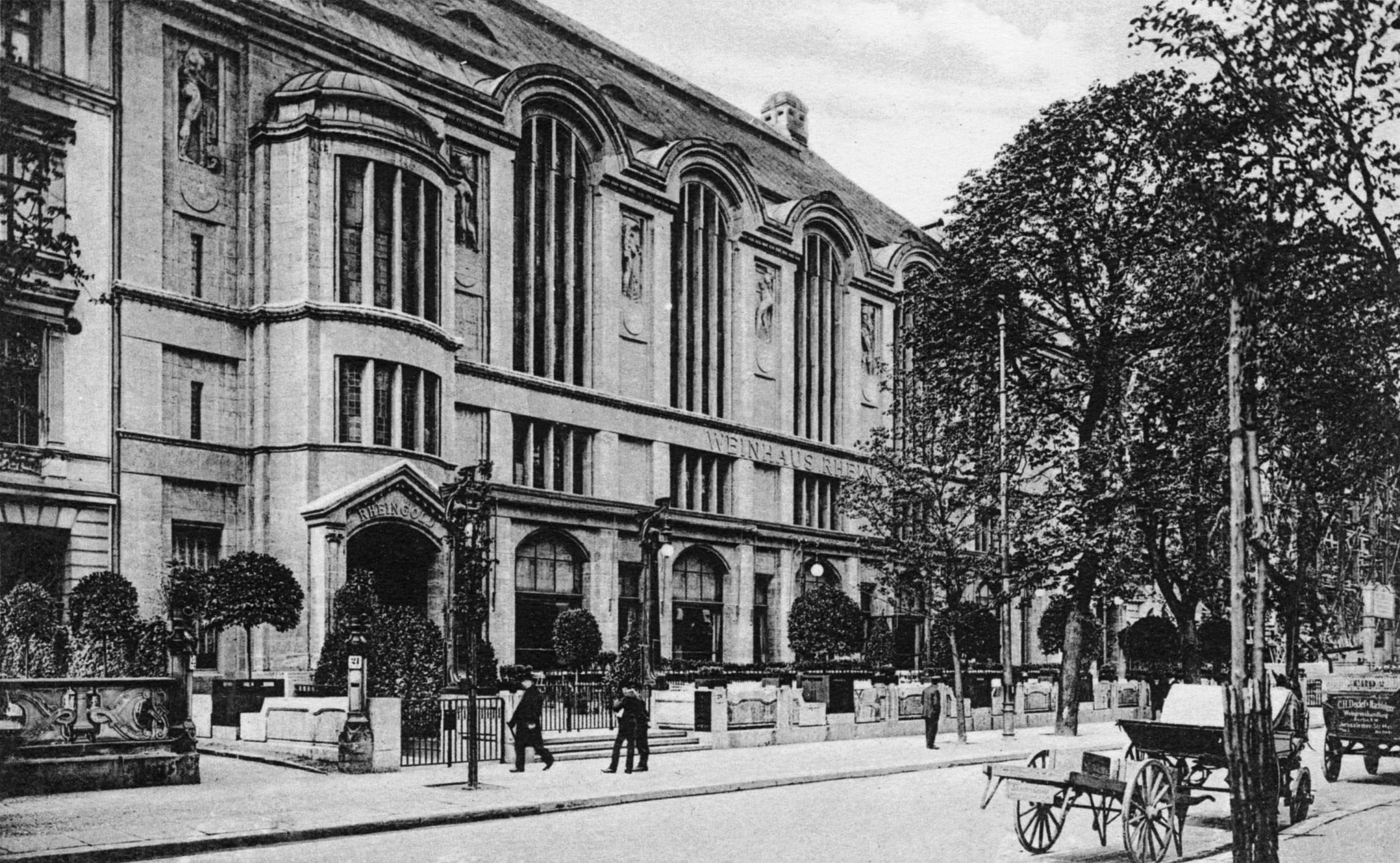
Weinhaus Rheingold, view from Bellevuestraße, around 1907

The Weinhaus Rheingold in Berlin, Germany, was a large restaurant of the Aschinger concern, in which up to 4,000 guests could be served simultaneously. The building near the Potsdamer Platz was severely damaged in World War II during Allied air raids and the ruins were demolished in the early 1950s.

The steel frame building, constructed from 1905 to 1907 according to plans by architect Bruno Schmitz, was intended as a concert hall with attached assembly rooms and wine restaurant to mark the Aschinger company's entry into upscale gastronomy. To avoid additional traffic at the already overloaded Potsdamer Platz, however, the use was building police restricted to pure gastronomic operations. Even the difficult construction work, associated with groundwater lowering and elaborate securing of neighboring houses, aroused the interest of the daily press.

The contemporary architectural press reported almost enthusiastically about the completed new building in 1907. Particular attention was paid to the monumental facade on Bellevuestraße with reliefs by sculptor Franz Metzner – often rated as equivalent to Alfred Messel's facade of the nearby Wertheim department store at Leipziger Platz. The luxurious interior of the fourteen halls, partly rather exotic, partly inspired by the Middle Ages, created a different atmosphere in each room and was intended to immerse visitors in various worlds.

Economically, the prestige building was a failure for Aschinger. After decades of lacking profitability, the concern finally sold the Weinhaus, which had already been closed due to the war, in 1943 to the Deutsche Reichspost. In the same year, the complex suffered severe damage during the air raids on Berlin. The ruins, classified as rebuildable, were nevertheless demolished in the early 1950s. The site of the former Weinhaus Rheingold is now largely occupied by the Bahntower, the rerouted Potsdamer Straße and the Kollhoff-Tower after the redevelopment of Potsdamer Platz.

== The Aschingers – builders with visions ==
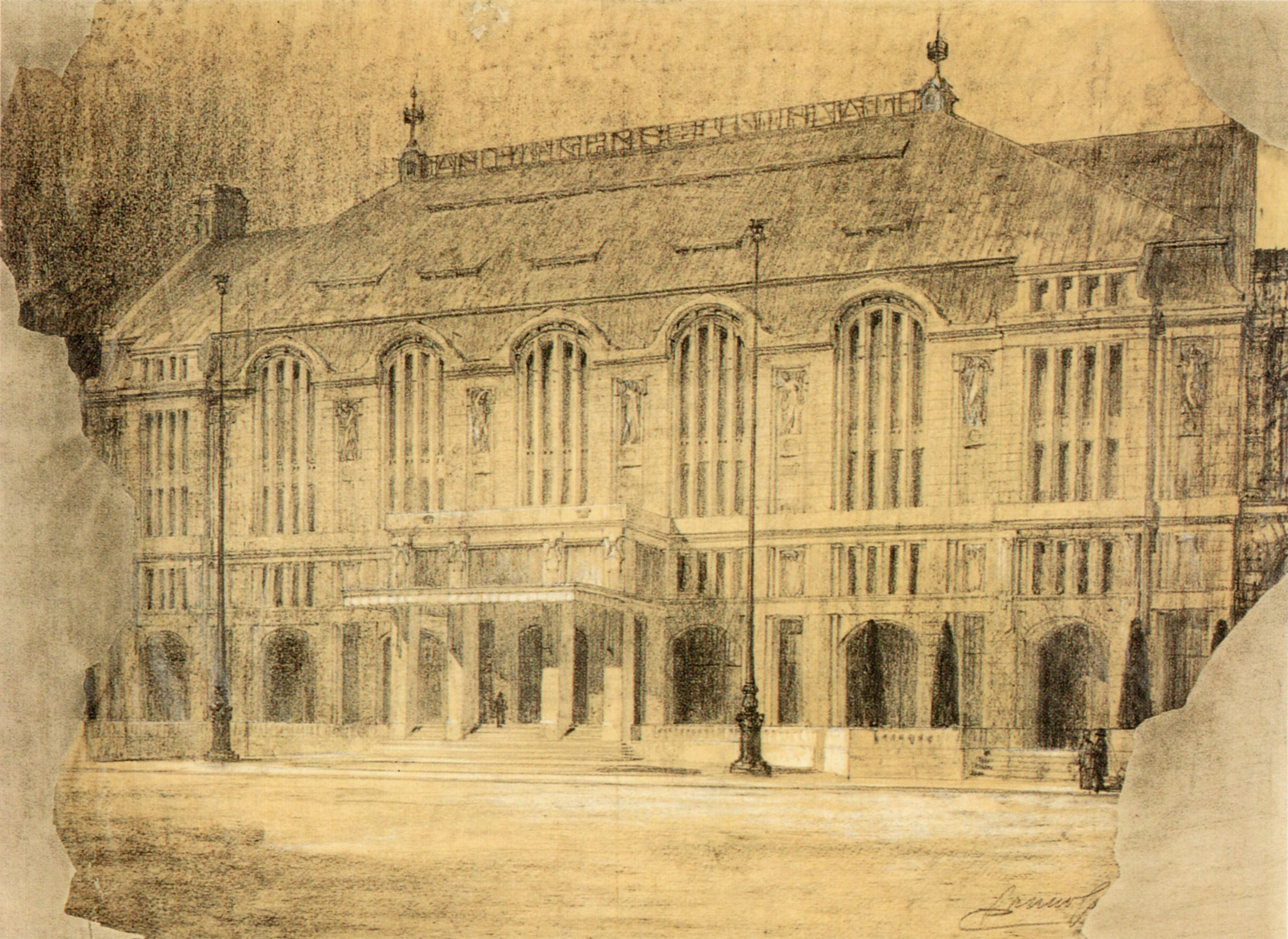
Design drawing for the Weinhaus Rheingold as a concert hall by Bruno Schmitz

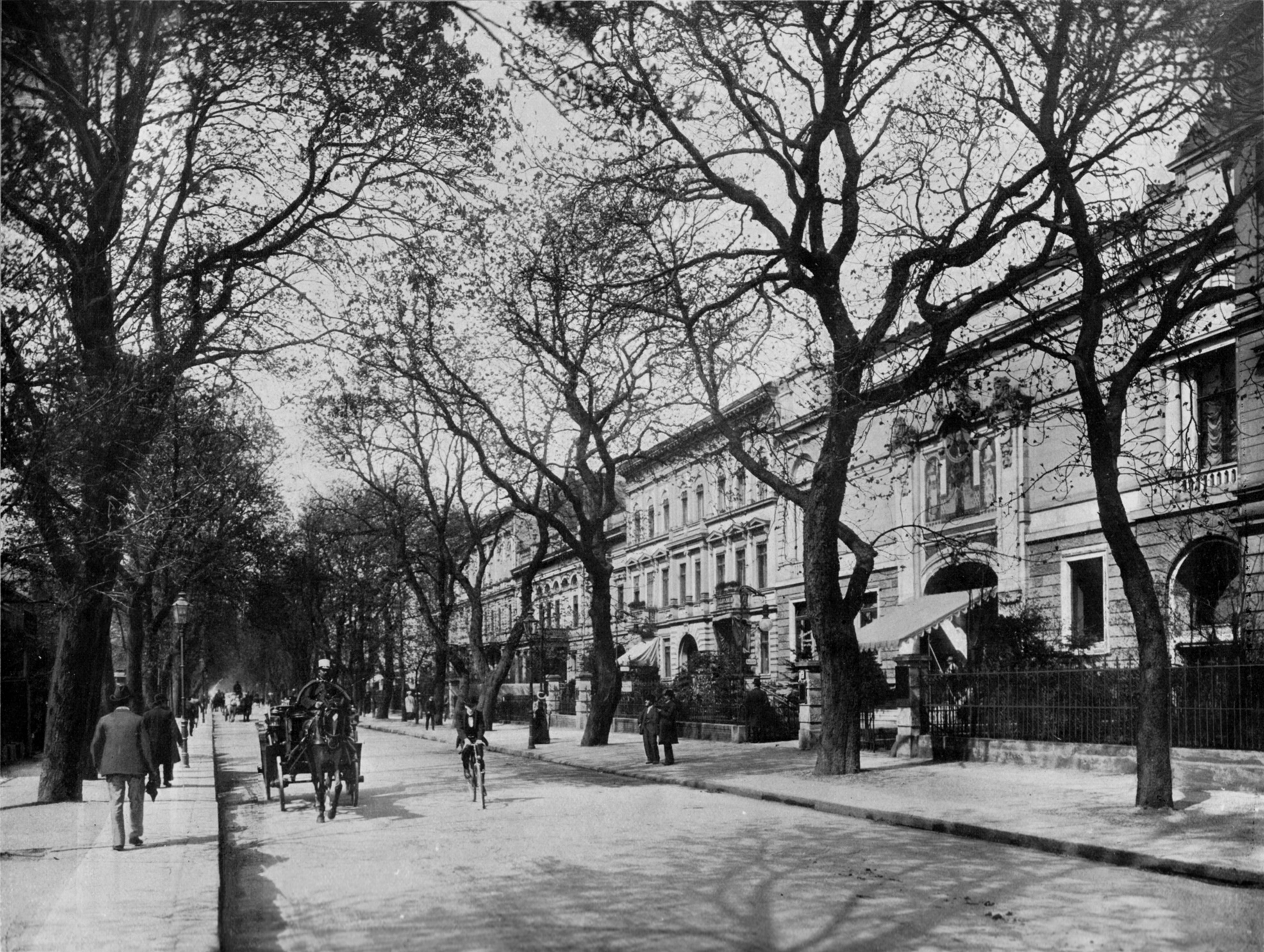
Bellevuestraße around 1900

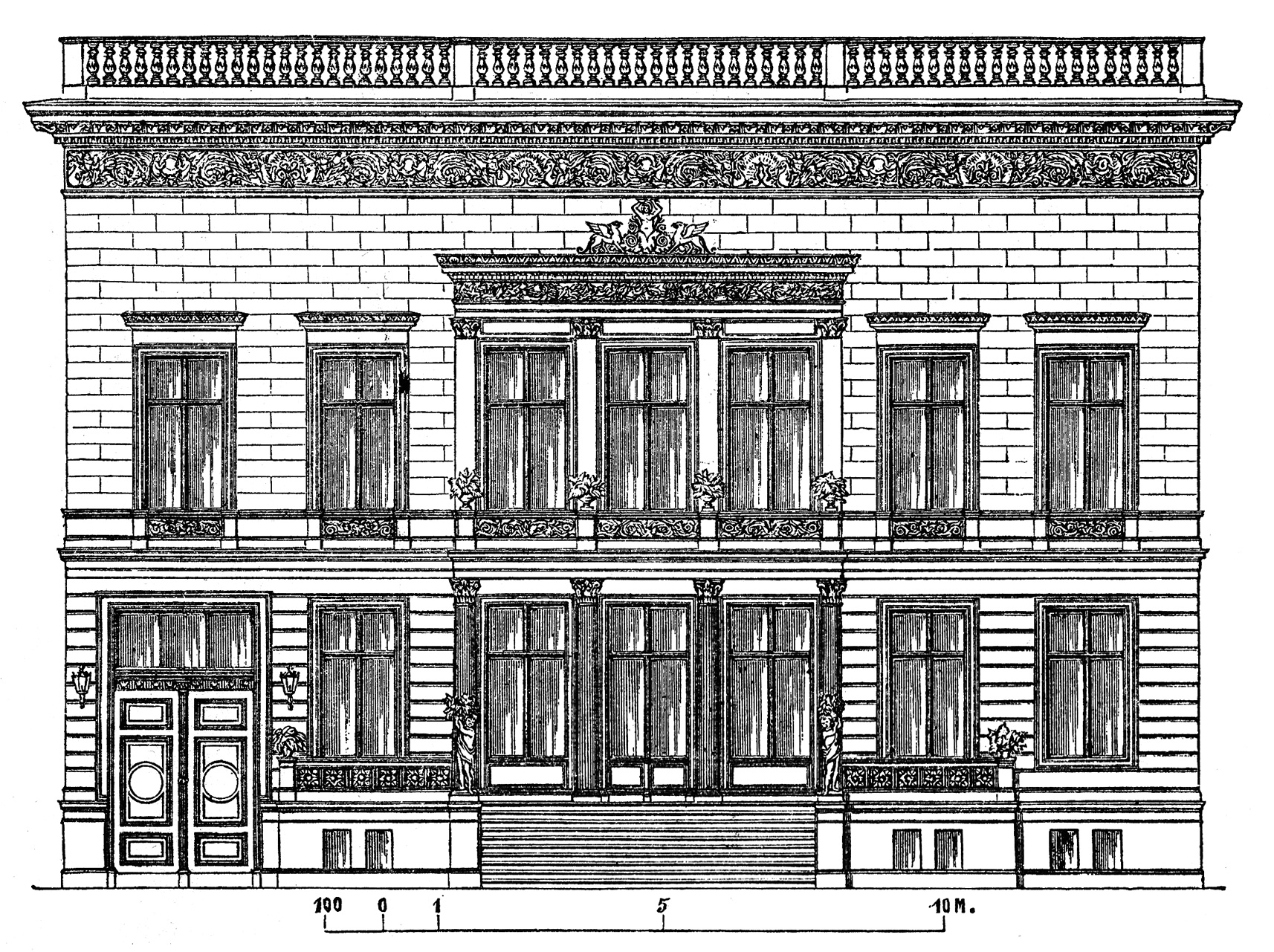
Anker residence, the predecessor building at Bellevuestraße 19a

The company Aschinger’s Bierquelle, founded in 1892 by the brothers Carl Aschinger and August Aschinger, operated from 1900 as Aschinger’s Bierquelle AG, a public limited company in family ownership with a share capital of three million marks. Having grown successful with their "Bierquellen" – standing beer halls with inexpensive meals – the Aschingers sought entry into upscale gastronomy from 1905. The renaming of the company in December 1906 to Aschinger’s Aktien-Gesellschaft also illustrates the effort to shed the cheap beer hall image and open new business fields. With the acquisition of the old Hotel Fürstenhof at Potsdamer Platz, a first step toward this expansion was taken. After an architectural competition in 1905, a striking new building with luxurious furnishings was erected from 1906 to November 1907 in place of the predecessor, incorporating previously acquired neighboring properties.

A concert hall with attached assembly halls and restaurant was to complement the expansion. For this purpose, the company acquired several connected properties near Potsdamer Platz on Bellevuestraße and Potsdamer Straße in 1905. For the planning, the company owners won over architect Bruno Schmitz, known primarily for his monuments such as the Kyffhäuser Monument or the Deutsches Eck. With the city festival hall Rosengarten in Mannheim, he had already solved a related building task in 1903. The concert hall planned for Berlin was named after Richard Wagner's opera Das Rheingold, the first part of the cycle Der Ring des Nibelungen. The original intentions of the builders and the architect were recorded by architectural critic Hans Schliepmann in the magazine Berliner Architekturwelt: Planned was "a hall building for the most distinguished concert performances", a kind of "loge for the truly highest in Berlin society". The high expectations of the builders were described by Maximilian Rapsilber in the magazine Der Profanbau: "[…] in the consideration that in Berlin the great success is only conjured up by a truly grand-scale enterprise", he demanded, "naively expressed, the most beautiful house in Berlin as his own, cost what it may."

== Location ==
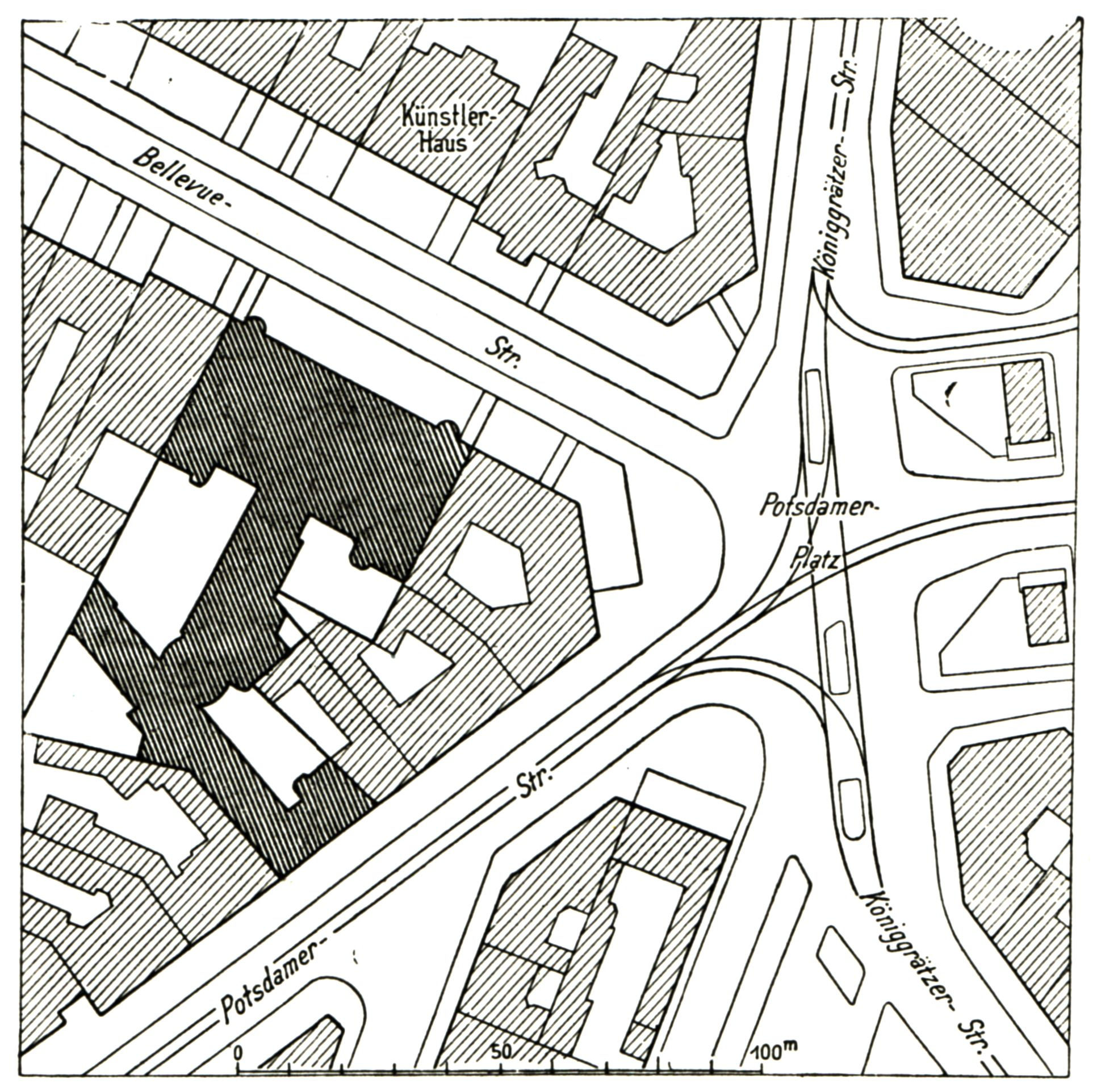
Site plan of the angular property between Bellevue- and Potsdamer Straße

The area around Potsdamer Platz changed in Berlin's development from a residence city to a metropolis several times within a few decades. Suburban development displaced the previous country houses from the 1820s. These gave way between 1850 and 1870 to elegant rental houses and villas, as Potsdamer Platz with its side streets became the preferred residential area for wealthy Berliners. The central location near the government district on Wilhelmstraße and the Potsdamer Bahnhof increased the attractiveness of the quarter after the founding of the German Empire in 1871, but also led to the displacement of residential space by office and administrative buildings as well as hotels and restaurants. Many of these buildings were erected between the 1890s and World War I.

For the construction of the Weinhaus Rheingold, the Aschinger company acquired in 1905 the properties Bellevuestraße 19, 19a and Potsdamer Straße 3, located only a few meters from Potsdamer Platz. Since the renumbering of Potsdamer Straße in 1938, the parcel bears the number 8 and today lies, after the rerouting of Potsdamer Straße, on Alte Potsdamer Straße. On the adjacent properties Bellevuestraße 17–18a, the Grand Hôtel Esplanade arose shortly thereafter as another grand hotel.

The three parcels together yielded an area of 5,044.67 square meters. As a result of the small-scale parcelling, the property was poorly cut and angular; only the 54 meter wide front on Bellevuestraße allowed a representative facade design, the street front on Potsdamer Straße with 21 meters was unsuitable for this. Nevertheless, Aschinger paid a considerable purchase price of four million marks in total. The property on Potsdamer Straße was built with a five-story apartment building, while the parcels on Bellevuestraße with the "Anker residence" by architect Christian August Hahnemann and the residence Bellevuestraße 19 rebuilt by the same architect, still showed the typical development of the 1850s.

== Change of use due to building police concerns ==
The capital tied up in the high purchase price of the property was to yield returns quickly, and the construction time for the new building was thus to be as short as possible. To accelerate the construction, the builder submitted two preliminary projects, which were approved by the building police within three to four weeks. The approval of the project itself took "despite the greatest and most amiable cooperation of all responsible authorities" nine months. An addendum submitted during the project's review period required another nine months – conditions that, in the opinion of the magazine Der Profanbau, demonstrated the need for reform of the Berlin building police regulations.

The approval came with a heavy condition for the Aschinger company. The building police feared a further increase in traffic at the already overloaded Potsdamer Platz due to the planned concert hall. Aggravating this was the fact that the Künstlerhaus of the Verein Berliner Künstler was already located directly opposite the planned concert hall at Bellevuestraße 3. Thus, the building police permitted only use as a restaurant. The condition mainly affected the wing intended as a concert hall on Bellevuestraße. However, the planning was already too advanced for major changes, and the original concept of Rheingold remained largely intact, even if the concert hall part now also had to be used gastronomically. Moreover, the planned extension of Voßstraße to the Tiergarten at the time gave hope to the builder and some architectural critics that the traffic relief at Potsdamer Platz would make the use restriction obsolete and the house could still serve its original purpose entirely.

== Construction phase ==
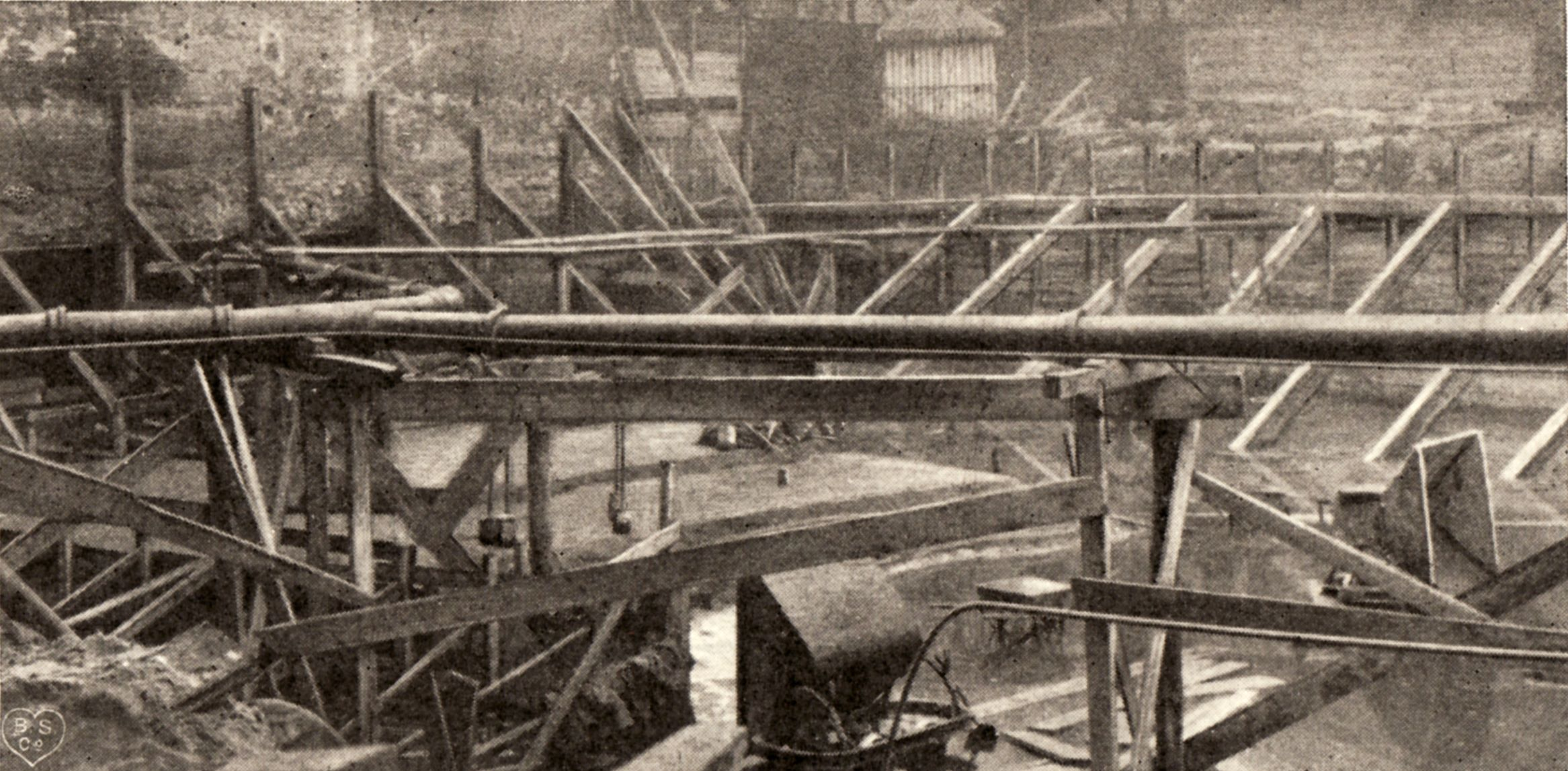
Device for groundwater lowering and securing the excavation pit

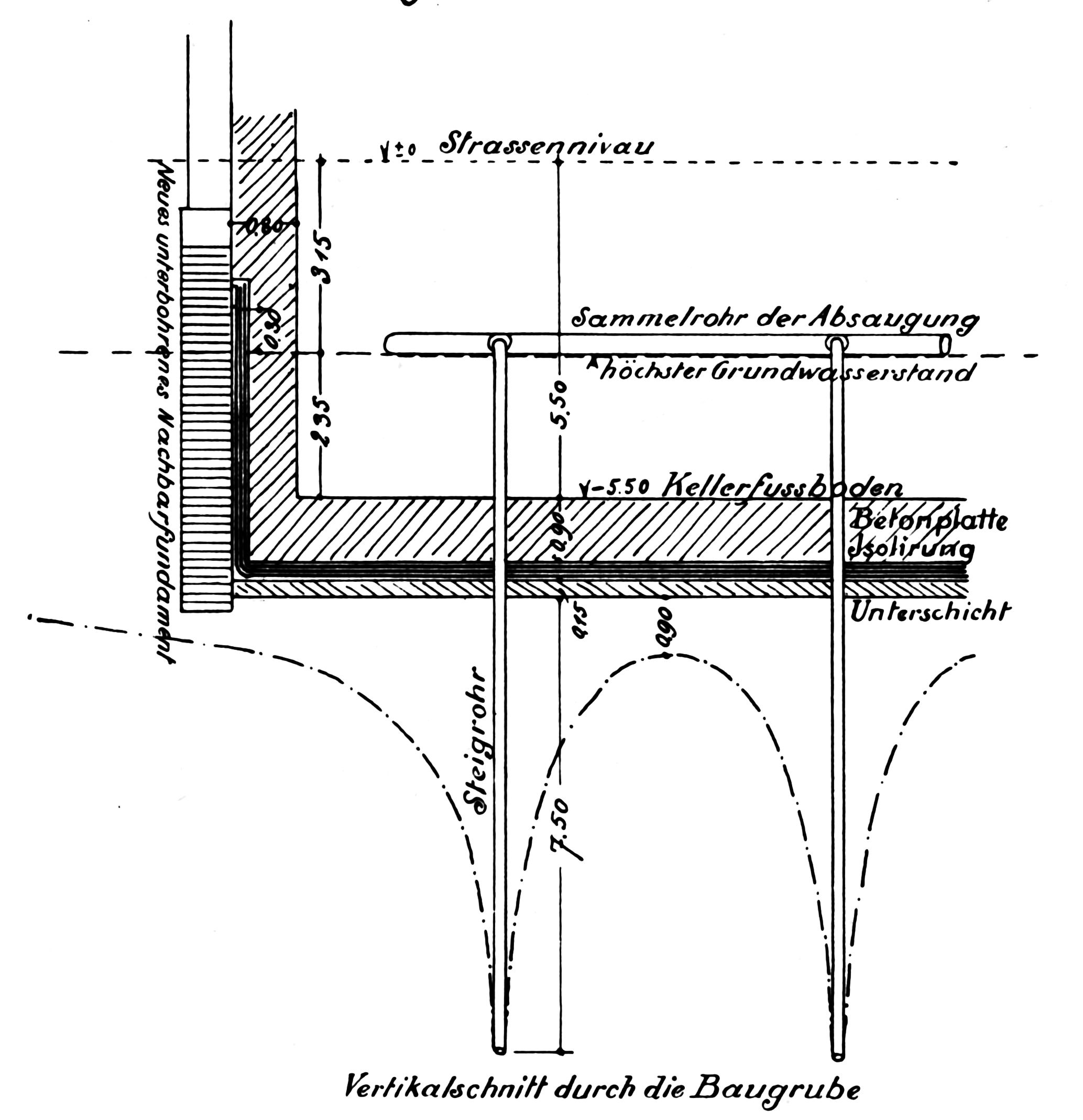
Vertical section of the excavation pit with suction wells and collection pipe

Construction work began in mid-November 1905 with demolition and excavation on Bellevuestraße, followed by the creation of the foundations. Masonry work could begin there as early as February 1906. At the same time, foundation work took place on the property at Potsdamer Straße 3, where machine foundations for the in-house power plant also had to be laid. These works were completed in May 1906.

The foundation, like the earthworks executed by the construction company Wayss & Freytag, was difficult due to the required lowering of the groundwater level and the enclosed location of the property, costing nearly 500,000 marks. First, the excavation pit was dug to the level of the groundwater table at about 3.1 meters depth. A total of 65 four-inch (approx. 10 cm) suction wells drilled at five-meter intervals in all directions, reaching 7.5 meters deep from the pit bottom into the soil, captured the rising groundwater. The main collection pipe, located at the groundwater level with 250 millimeters diameter was connected on one side to the wells and on the other to the electrically operated centrifugal pump. This sucked the groundwater from the wells into the main collection pipe and lifted it to street level, where it flowed into the city sewer. The lowering of the groundwater level occurred in two stages: first by 3.20 meters for laying the normal basement foundations and then by 4.60 meters for the machine foundations. The lowered level included a safety reserve of about 90 centimeters so that in case of pump failure, the construction site would not be immediately flooded. Nevertheless, pump failures flooded the site several times, leading to a total loss of seven working days. The groundwater lowering system remained in operation for seven months until the concrete slab of the foundation with the enclosing walls exerted a counterpressure corresponding to the groundwater uplift.

The enclosed property required securing neighboring buildings in the form of bracing gables and underpassing foundations of adjacent houses. Settlements and cracks as a result of groundwater lowering could not be completely avoided. The daily press reported sensational articles about it as "house collapse at Potsdamer Platz". The most serious incident, in which the basement floor in the side wing of the house Potsdamer Straße 4 cracked, led to police closure of the house due to collapse danger. Only after additional securing could construction continue. The house owner received compensation of 30,000 marks for the damage but had the house demolished shortly thereafter to redevelop the property, as probably planned for some time.

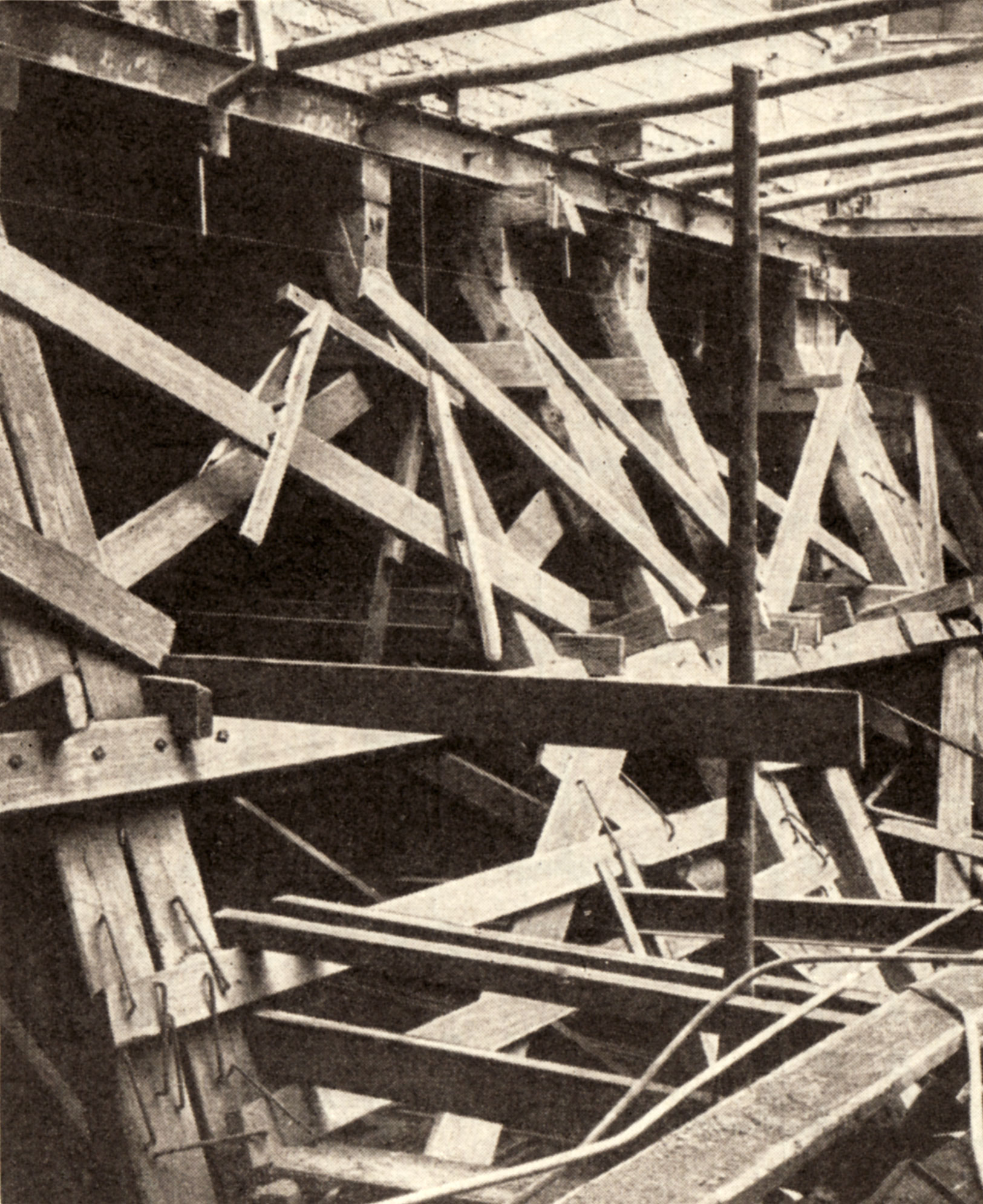
Bracings for the partial demolition at Potsdamer Straße 3

Special precautions on the construction site itself were required for the house at Potsdamer Straße 3. The tenants, including a branch of the Annoncen-Expedition of the Berliner Lokal-Anzeiger, had long-running leases, for which they demanded correspondingly high severance payments. Eventually, Aschinger managed to reach an agreement with the tenants of the basement, ground floor and first upper floor, enabling partial demolition of the old house. The old side wing and the western part of the house up to the second upper floor were demolished step by step while the new building rose. Above the complicated construction site hovered the upper floors of the old house, reinforced by tie rods, window and door stiffenings and supported by numerous bracings.

The tight schedule often required work in night shifts. The construction management also had to deal with work stoppages. Right at the beginning, a strike by masons halted all construction work, and eight weeks before the planned opening, the marble workers stopped work. They demanded 25 percent more wages and renunciation of night shifts – knowing full well that the timely completion of the building depended mainly on them. The executing company eventually brought workers from their Belgian plants to complete the work.

Despite all adversities, the shell was completed in July 1906, and the building was finished as early as the beginning of February 1907. The opening was originally planned for January 27, the birthday of Emperor Wilhelm II, but took place delayed on February 6, 1907. Contemporary architectural press praised the short construction time of 14 1/2 months as a record given the difficult foundation work and rich interior.

The incurred construction costs of about 4.5 million marks (purchasing power adjusted in today's currency: around 28.59 million euros) significantly exceeded the initially calculated 3.5 million marks. Causes of the cost increase were planning changes and the interior finishing with "noblest building materials", which was more expensive than planned. The considerable construction costs for a private builder are illustrated by comparison with the four million marks for the Kaiser Wilhelm National Monument completed in 1897 and seven million marks for the Altes Stadthaus in Berlin completed in 1911.

The Deutsche Bauzeitung calculated costs of 560 marks per square meter for the shell including foundation and 940 marks for the interior. The cubic meter of enclosed space cost a total of 55.60 marks, of which 20.80 marks for the shell including foundation and 34.80 marks for the interior.

== Building description ==
Bruno Schmitz divided the building masses into three wings. The hall building of the planned concert hall, as the largest of the three, extended along Bellevuestraße and connected seamlessly to the development of the neighboring properties. The gastronomy wing on Potsdamer Straße pierced the existing front building on the lower floors. At right angles to Potsdamer Straße, it initially followed the southwestern property boundary and extended to the adjacent parcel of the Grand Hôtel Esplanade. The connecting wing, also used gastronomically, connected the other two wings. Extending at right angles from the central axis of the hall building, it met the wing on Potsdamer Straße at an oblique angle, with a rotunda skillfully mediating between the different axes. The courtyards on the remaining areas of the irregularly cut property served partly elaborately designed in summer as extensions of the restaurants, partly as pure service courtyards.

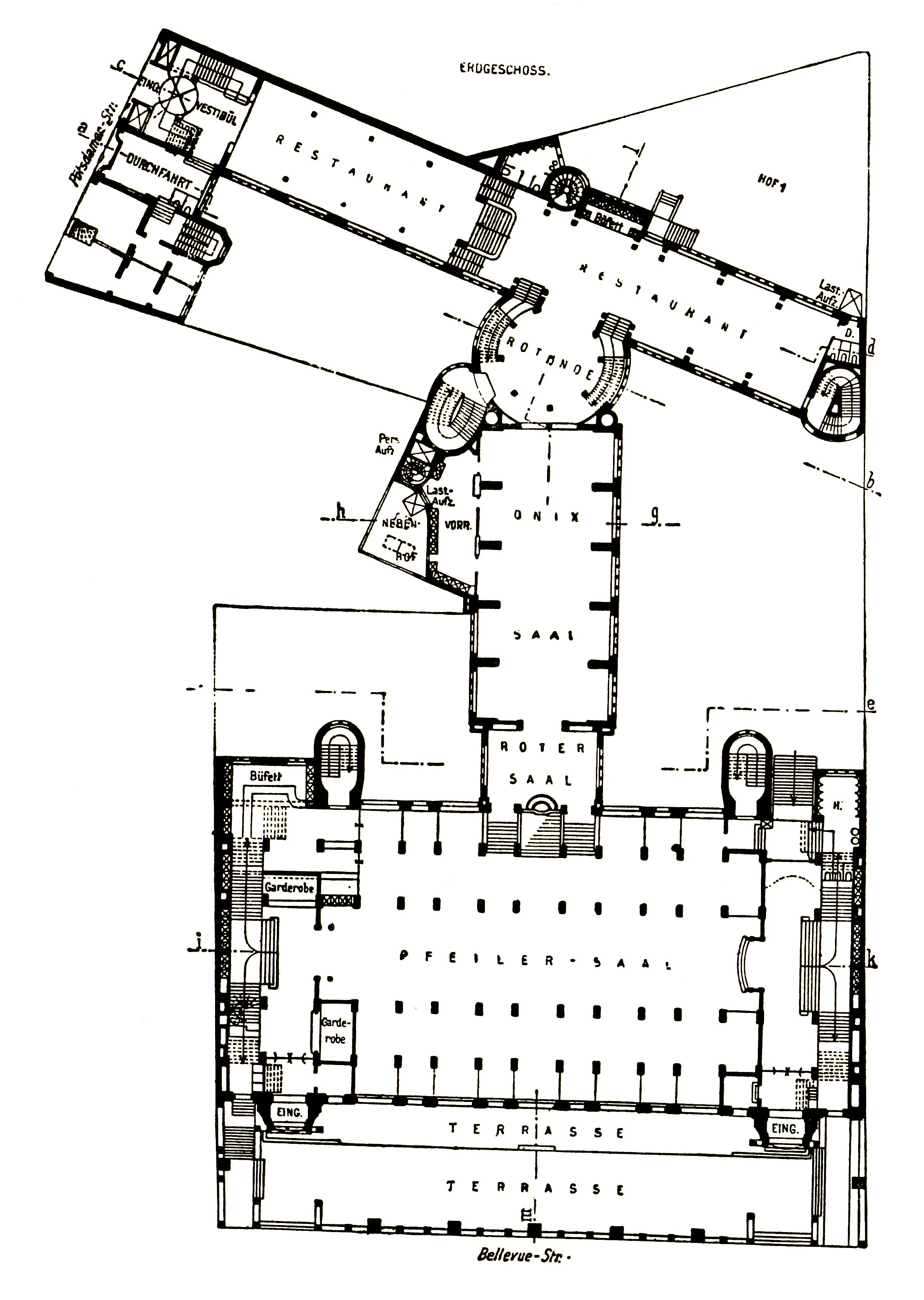
Ground floor plan

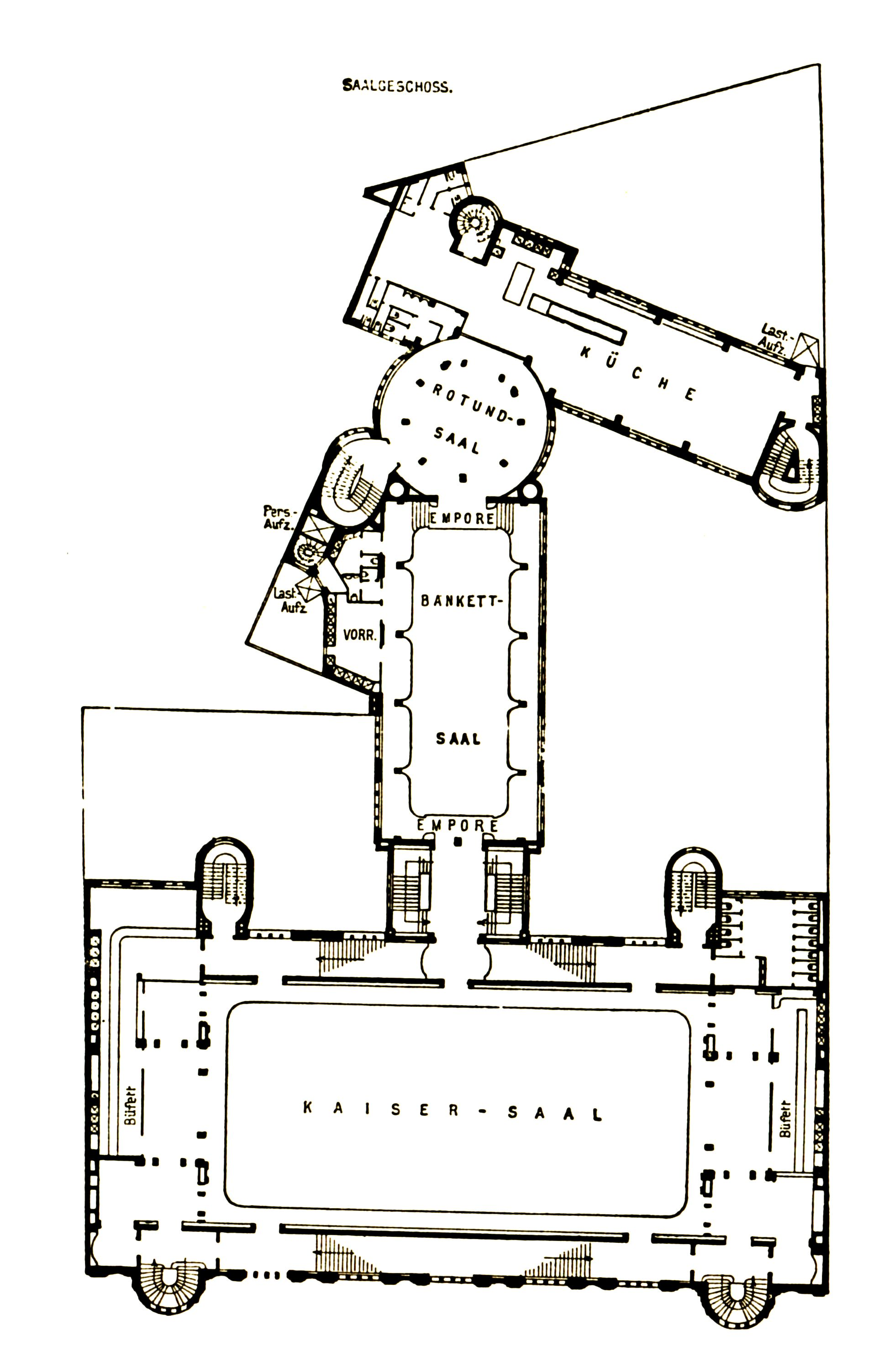
Hall floor plan

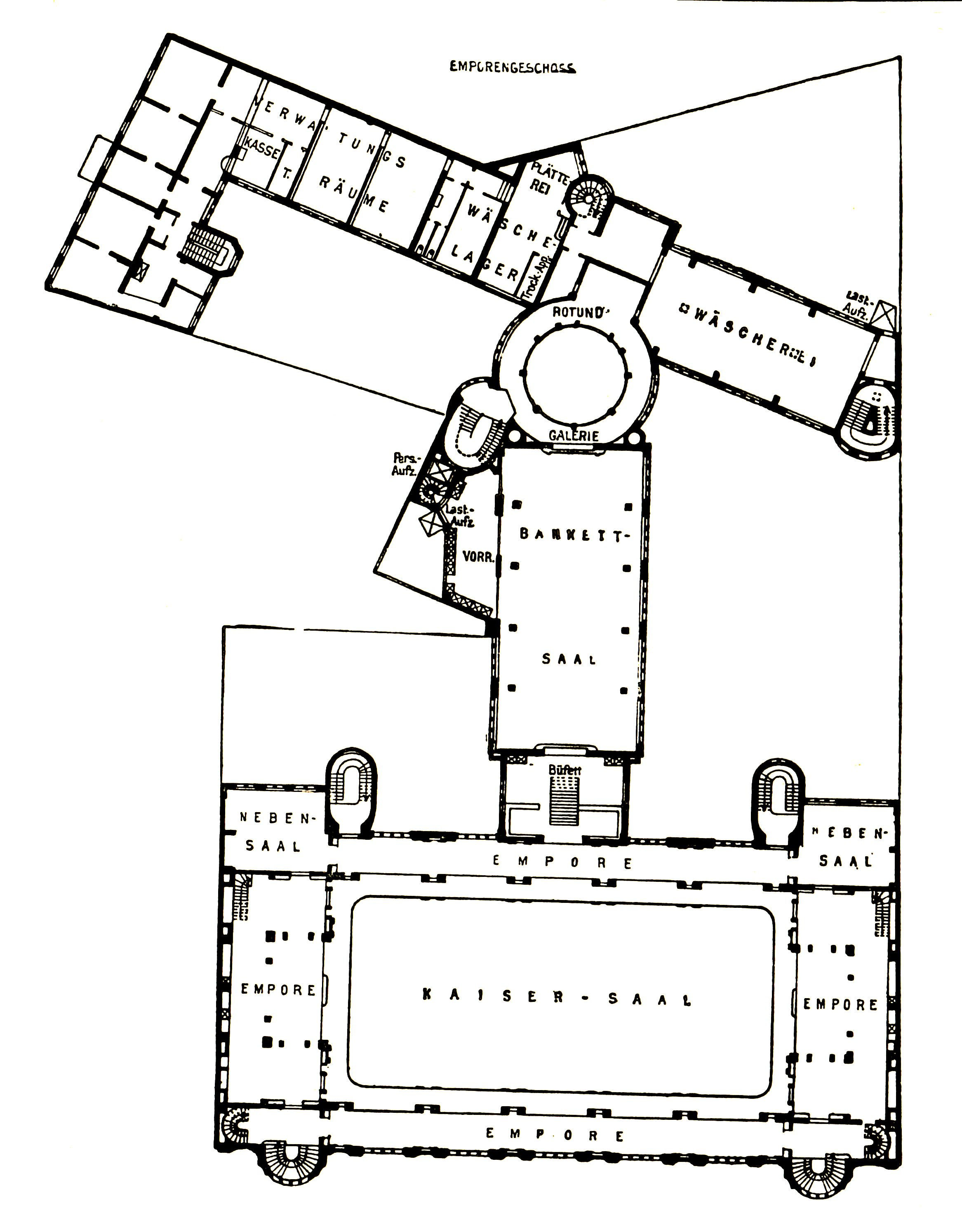
Gallery floor plan

The building police requirement that the courtyards must have a driveway, and the builder's desire for as continuous floors as possible from Bellevuestraße to Potsdamer Straße, determined the horizontal division of the building complex. Since the representative facade on Bellevuestraße was not to be disturbed by a driveway, all courtyards had to be accessed from Potsdamer Straße. The necessary driveways required crossing the connecting building twice and would have prevented a continuous ground floor. Schmitz found the solution by lowering the level of the two courtyards to be accessed by half a floor relative to street level on one hand, and raising the level of the ground floor in the connecting wing and the rear part of the wing on Potsdamer Straße by half a floor on the other. This not only allowed the driveways to be carried out without problems – additional rooms found space under the raised halls of the ground floor. Stair systems inside mediated between the different levels and created interesting passage spaces like the "Red Hall". Together with the actual stair systems, they allowed visitors to traverse the varied room sequences in the ground, hall and gallery floors in many ways.

The four- to five-story steel frame building promised, with its progressive facade on Bellevuestraße, a correspondingly modern interior design. However, this was done according to rather conservative, decoration-oriented principles. Its motifs were mainly found in the eponymous opera Rheingold and the other operas from Wagner's tetralogy, but also integrated medieval and exotic decorations as well as other sagas into a peculiar fusion of mythical and national symbolism with Art Nouveau elements.

The building materials, marble types, and woods created the atmosphere appropriate to the "most beautiful house in Berlin". Even for the works, the Aschinger company placed value on prestige – among the executing companies are many court suppliers, many involved in the reconstruction of the Berlin City Palace under Wilhelm II.

=== The hall building on Bellevuestraße ===
==== Facade on Bellevuestraße ====
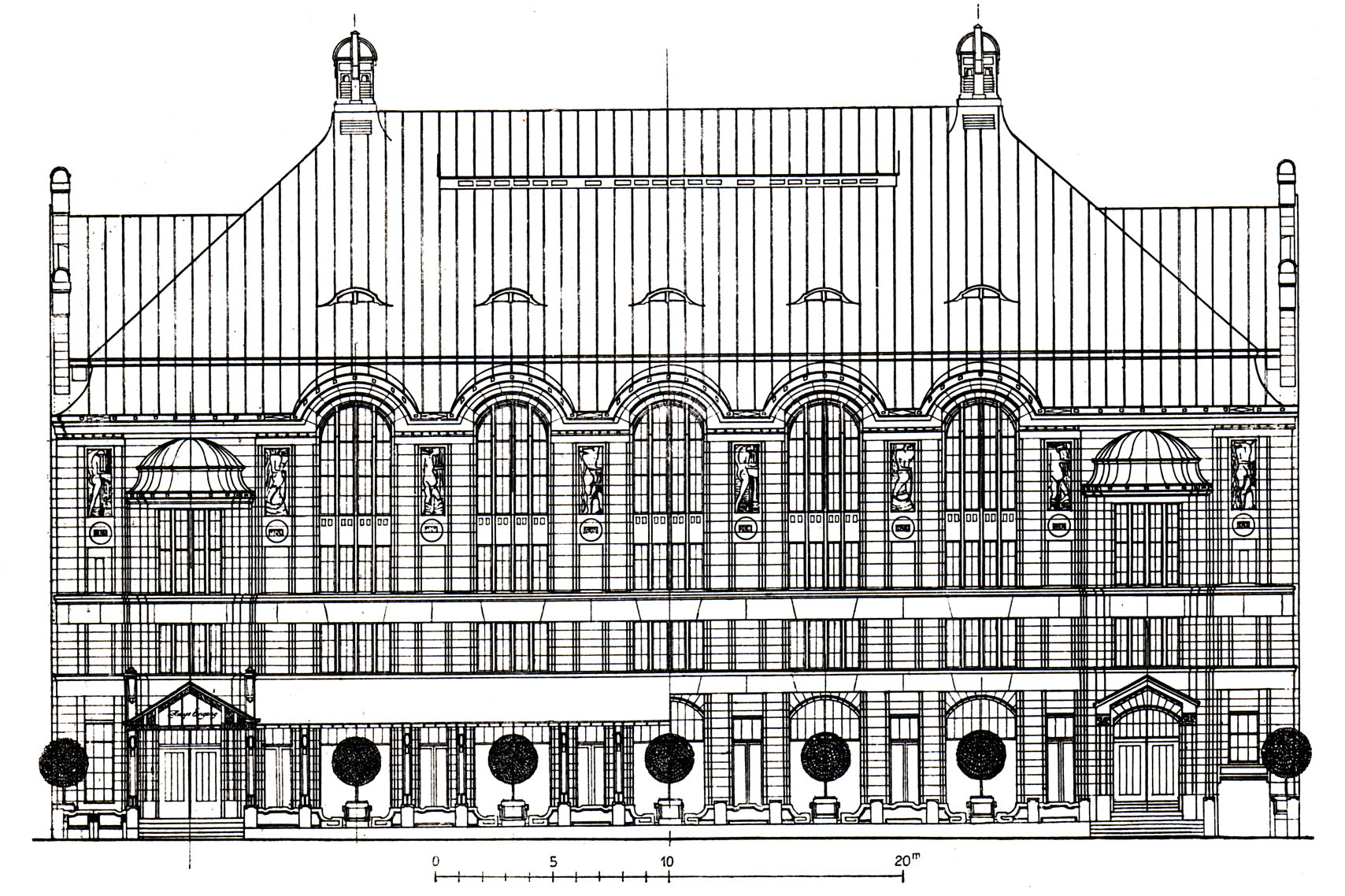
Facade on Bellevuestraße

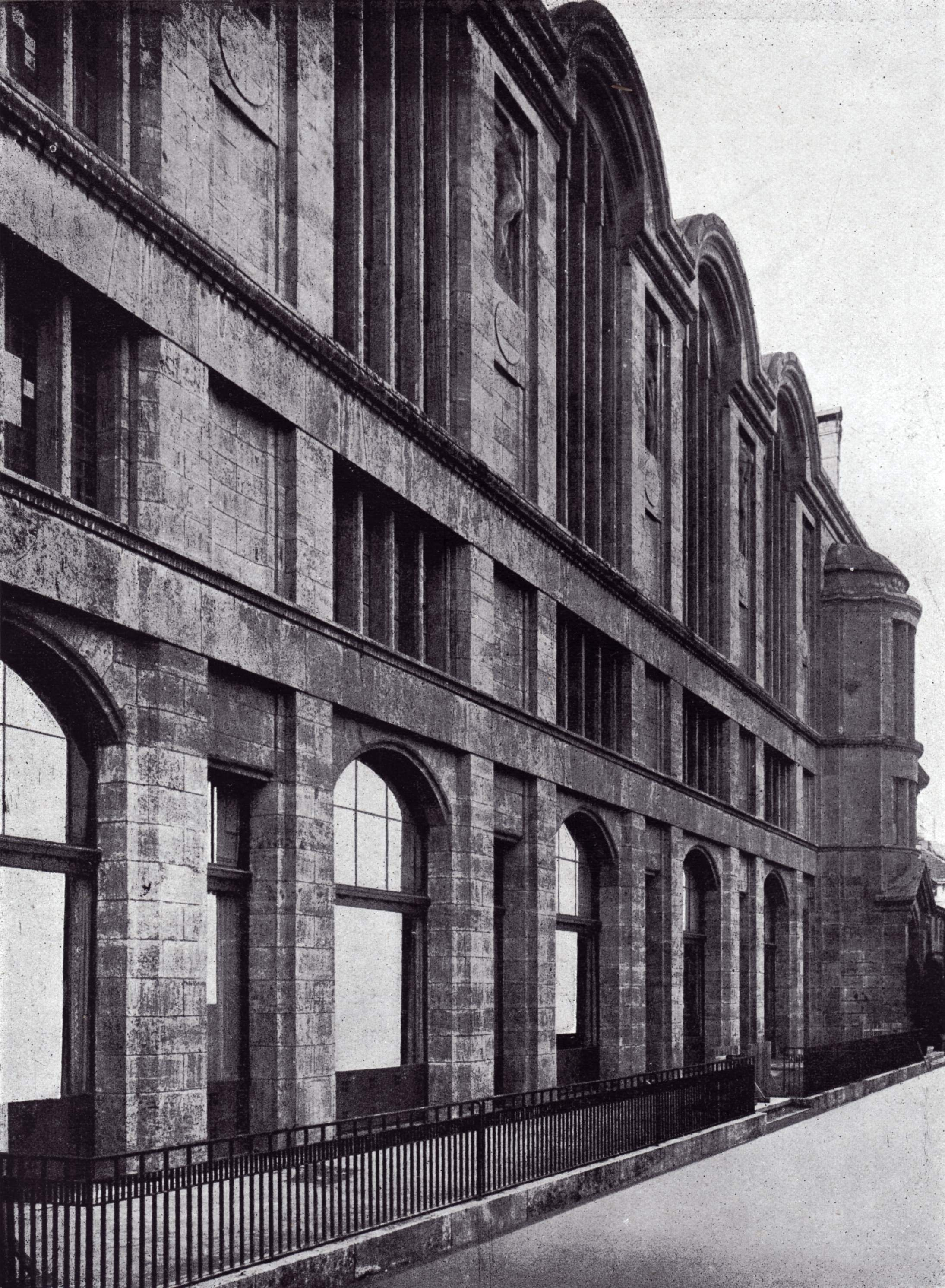
View of the Bellevuestraße facade, 1907

Two risalit-like portal projections protruding 3.5 meters beyond the building line, 5.3 meters wide, framed the five-bay main facade on Bellevuestraße. Their essentially semicircular ground plan was broken on the show side by concave indentations. On the ground floor, the portals covered with triangular pediments led from the terrace into the pillar hall of the hall building. In the upper two stories, windows divided by stone posts illuminated the staircases behind them. A bell-shaped copper dome roof closed the risalits below the main cornice.

Strong and smooth wall pilasters, like the rest of the ashlar facade of Franconian limestone, divided the 53.21 meter long front vertically. The horizontal was emphasized by a narrower, one meter wide belt course above the ground floor and a somewhat wider 1.2 meter belt course above the mezzanine. The inscription "WEINHAUS RHEINGOLD" in gilded metal letters in the middle of the upper cornice discreetly advertised the establishment. From these cornices, the internal division of the hall building into ground floor, cloakroom floor and hall floor could be read externally.

The round arches breaking through the main cornice in a segmental manner over the continuous large windows divided by posts in the hall floor were described by architectural critic Hans Schliepmann as the "most effective moment of the facade design". The reason for this solution was the building police prescribed height of the building front on Bellevuestraße, which forced Bruno Schmitz to move the vault of the planned concert hall into the attic. Thus he could bring the main cornice in line with the regulations, and only the round arches of the windows ended above it. Above followed the originally copper-covered roof. Presumably, the "uniquely shaped and necessary for the overall impression" copper roof disappeared already a few years after completion as a metal donation during World War I. Photos from the 1920s show the roof newly covered with tiles with the large-format inscription "WEINHAUS RHEINGOLD" inlaid in white tiles. Schmitz used the same motif with the round arch windows breaking through the main cornice a second time in 1910 in his competition design for the Reiß Museum in Mannheim.

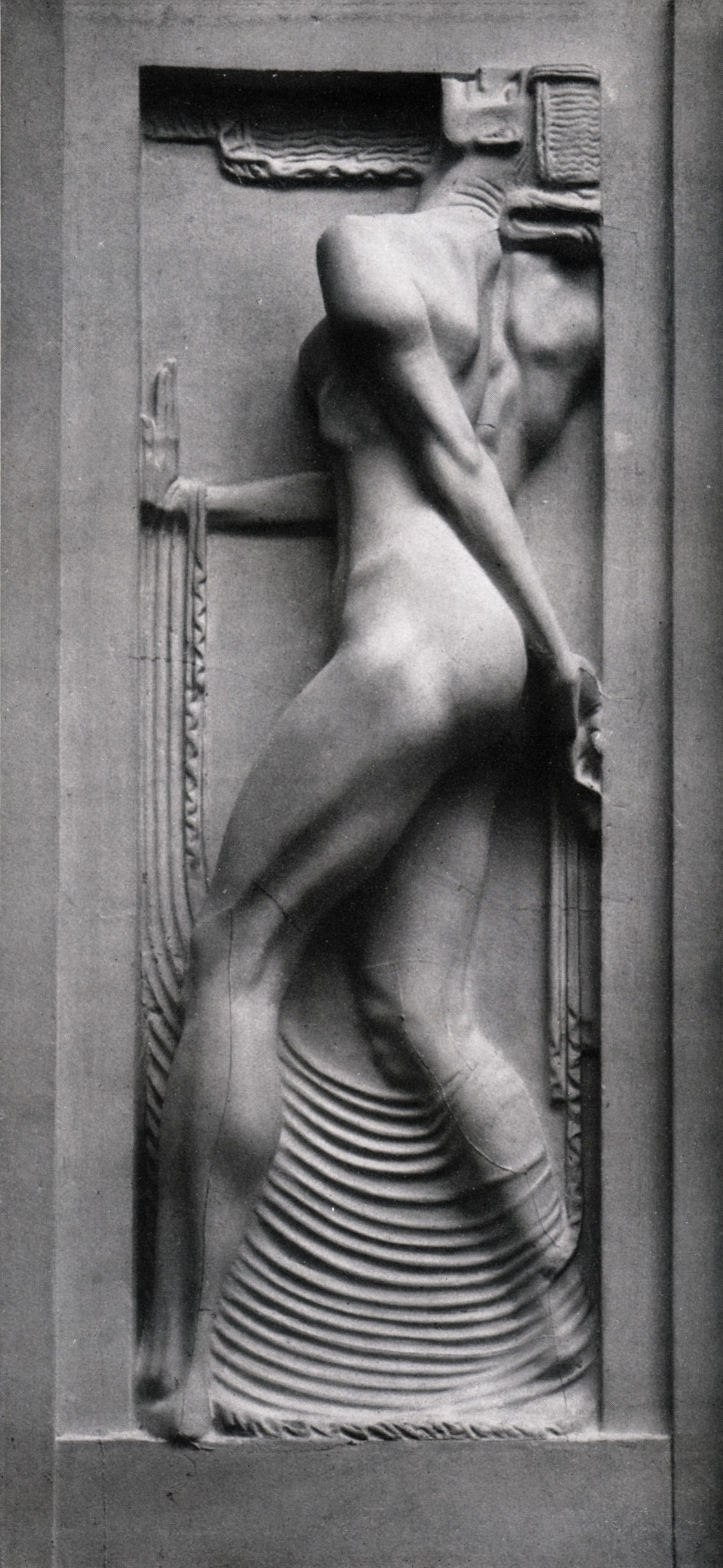
Facade relief Bellevuestraße

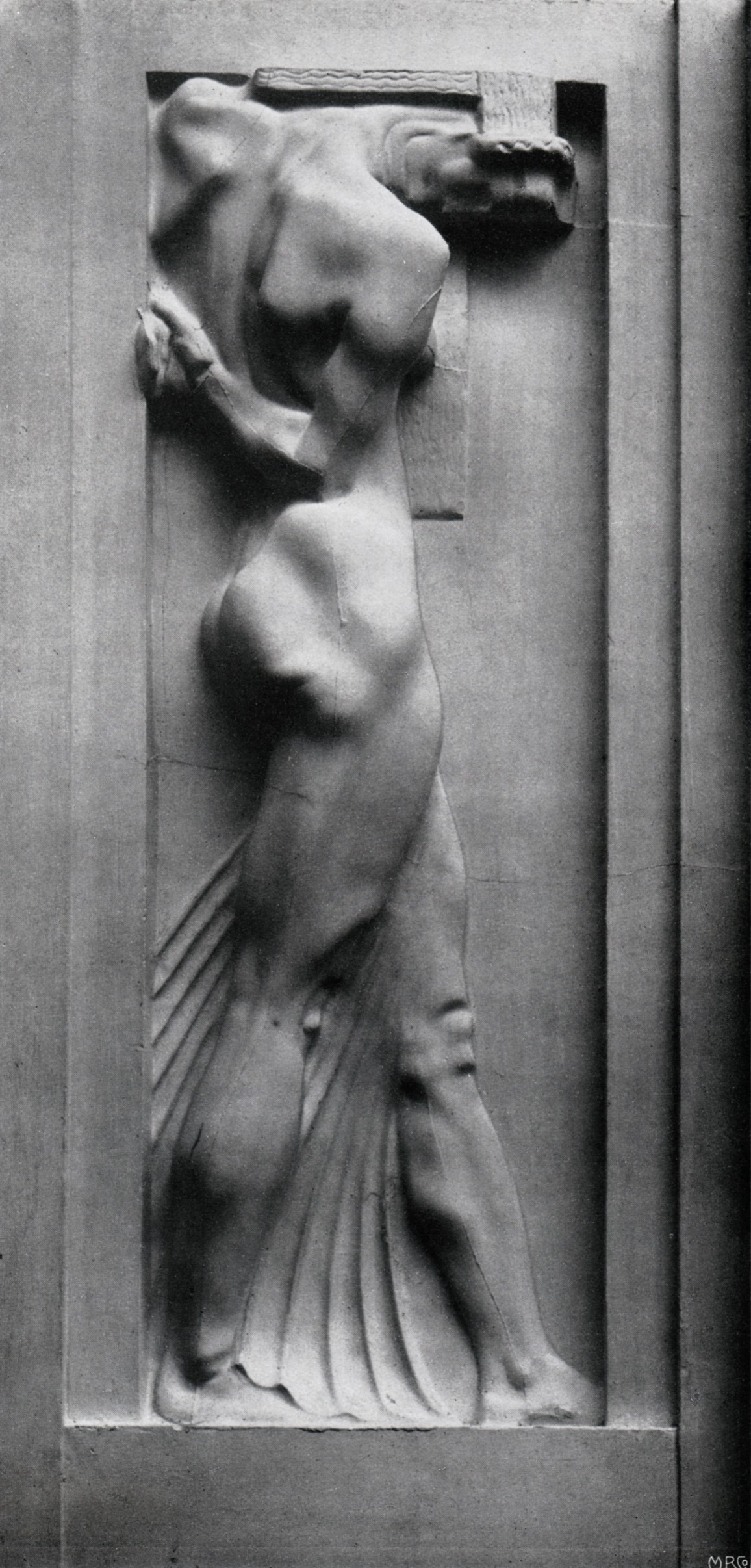
Relief Vanity

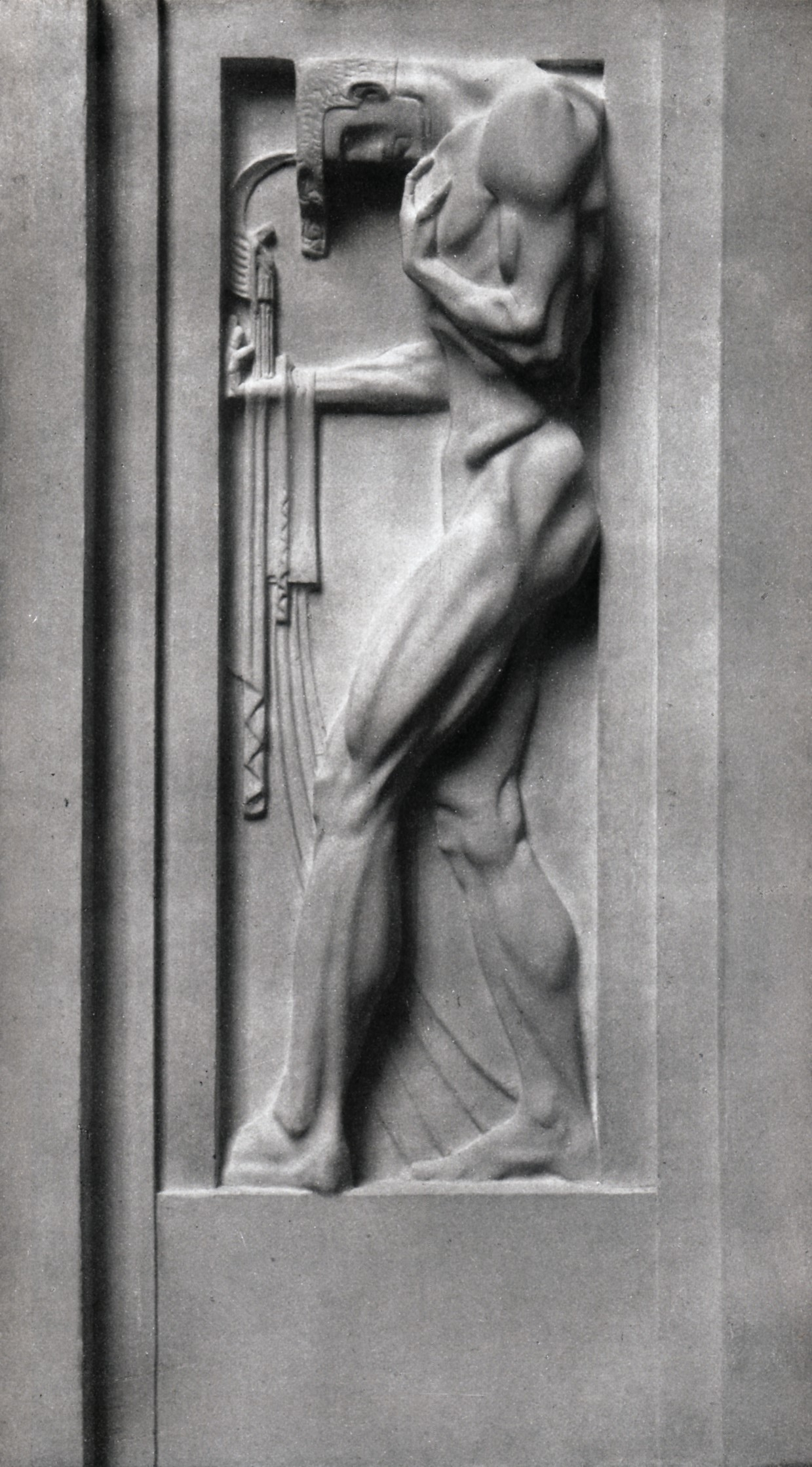
Relief Art

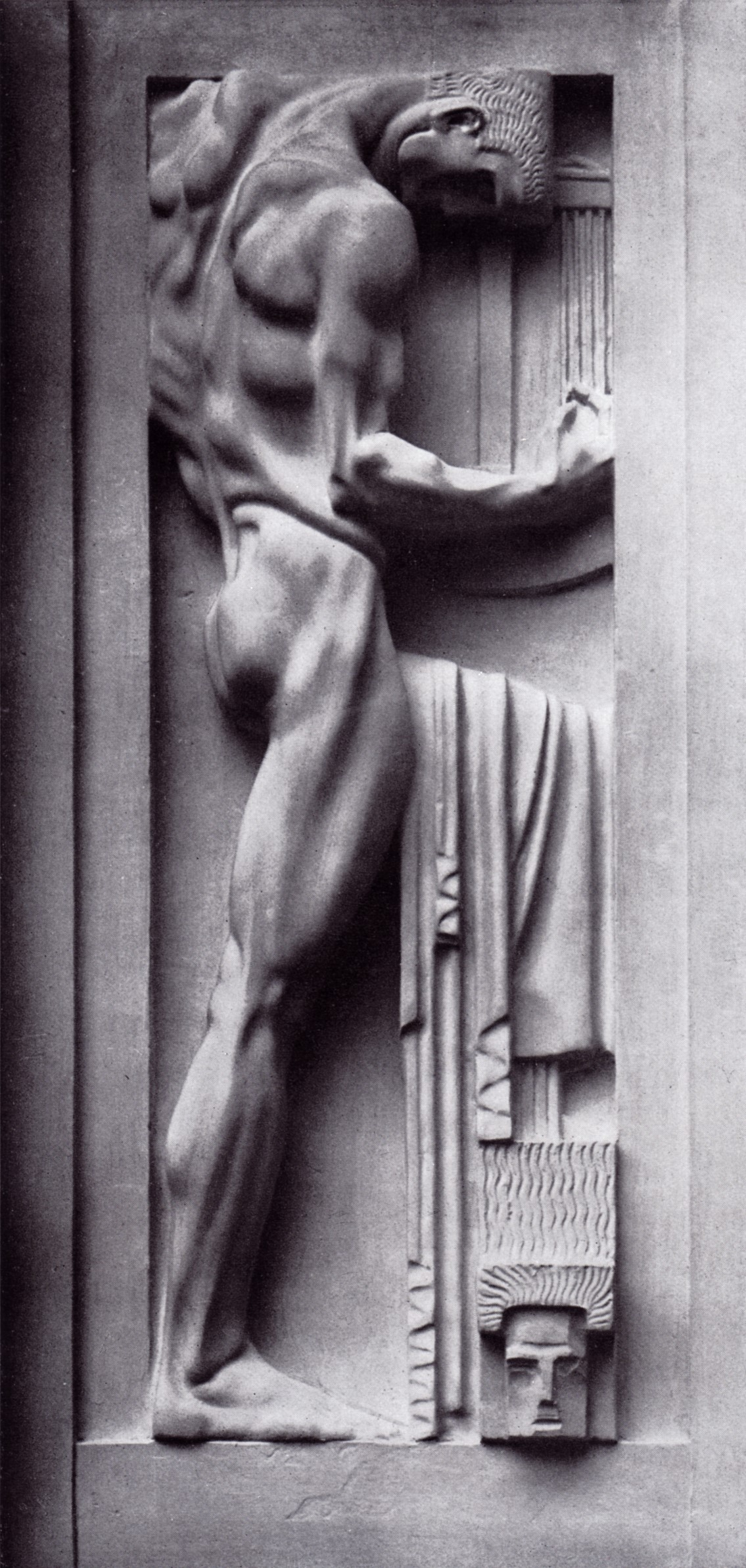
Relief Music

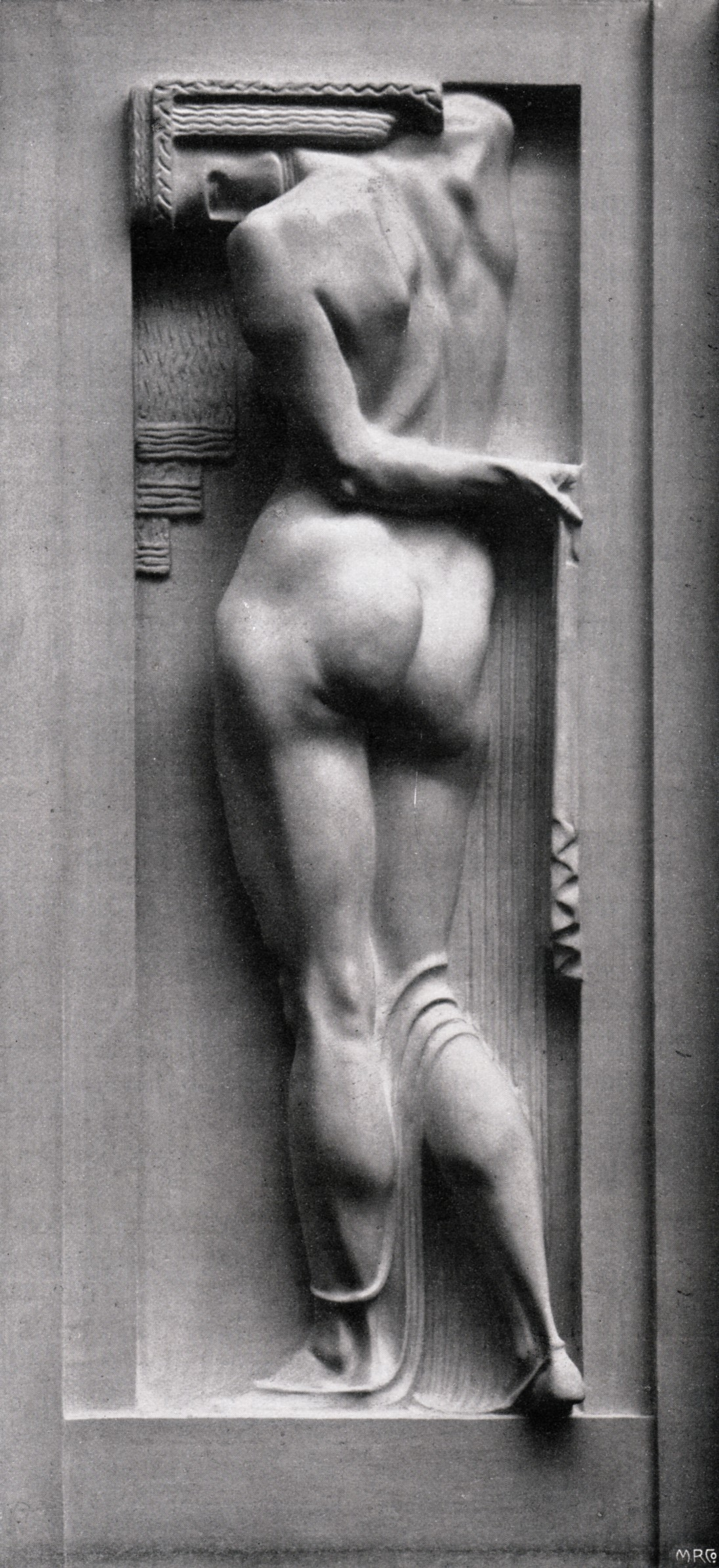
Relief Beauty

The monumental power of the tectonic primal forms of the wall pilasters and cornices required appropriate architectural sculpture. The eight high relief panels with allegorical representations such as Vanity, Art, Music or Beauty between the 3.0 meter wide windows of the hall floor and left and right of the portal projections were created by sculptor Franz Metzner, with whom Bruno Schmitz had already collaborated on the Völkerschlachtdenkmal in Leipzig. However, the allegorical meaning seems rather pretextual. Hans Schliepmann sees in the magazine Deutsche Kunst und Dekoration in the "atlas-like figures in the named relief fillings merely expression of bulging power of carrying, counter-thrusting", the artist wants "to express the conflict between support and load through the corporeal, through muscle play". A few years later, in the special issue of Berliner Architekturwelt for Bruno Schmitz's 55th birthday in 1913, he again emphasized the importance of the Rheingold facade, where for the first time a "new decorative motif, the purely decorative use of human forms" had appeared before the public and coined the term "muscle ornament" for it.

As a consequence of the use restriction to pure gastronomic operations, the terrace turned out significantly larger than in the original designs. In particular, the subsequently added tent roofs – already drawn in the facade drawing – impair the view of the front in the narrow Bellevuestraße.

==== Pillar hall ====
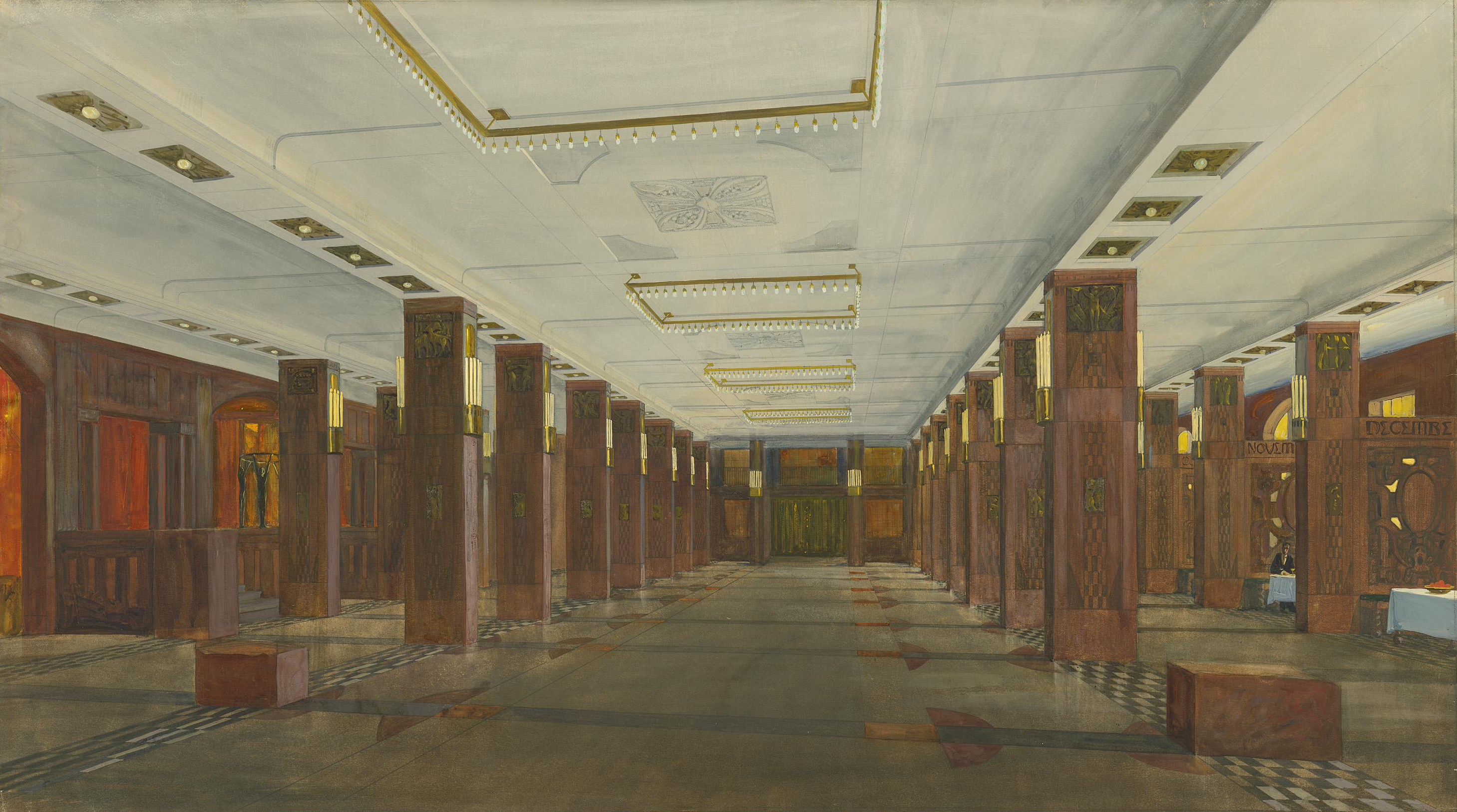
Design of the pillar hall

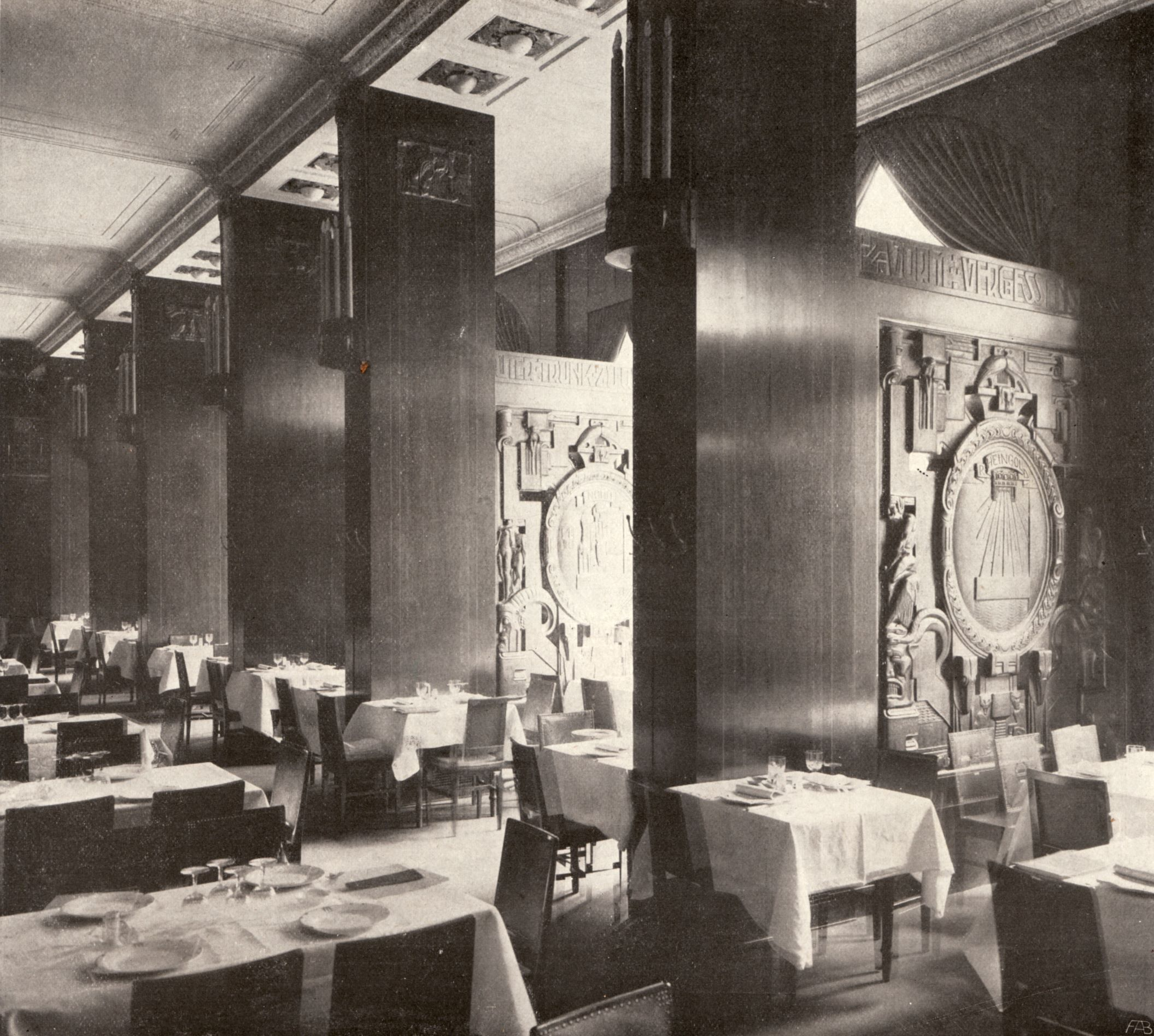
View of the pillar hall

The pillar hall comprised with about 700 m^{2} the majority of the ground floor. The first room on the ground floor of the hall building accommodated the visitor cloakroom and ensured the access to the further rooms of the Weinhaus Rheingold. At the two main entrances on Bellevuestraße at the ends of the hall, two symmetrical three-armed stair systems enclosed it, leading to the upper rooms of the Weinhaus and expanding the room at about half height by two galleries. In the middle of the hall, stair systems led to the rooms of the connecting wing.

Four rows of pillars divided the room, which with 5.2 meters was only moderately high compared to the area, into a wider central nave and two narrower side naves each. The pillars were part of a pillar system running through the entire building on Bellevuestraße, supporting the floor of the Emperor's Hall on the hall floor.

Between the outer pillar rows and the exterior walls, 3.2 meter high wood panels separated box-like areas. Pillars and walls were clad in dark brown rosewood, in places with decorative inlays of other exotic woods. These master carpentry works were supplied by the company Kimbel & Friederichsen, court supplier to the Emperor. The "masterful carvings" in the box walls, containing "bacchic motifs", as well as the bronze reliefs on the pillars were created by sculptor Hermann Feuerhahn. The light gray speckled plaster ceiling contrasted effectively with the deep brown of the wood. The large windows toward the terrace illuminated the room and could be sunk into the floor in summer. In darkness, wall sconces in candle form and rows of incandescent lamps on the ceiling created "a lavish flood of light".

==== Cloakroom vestibule ====
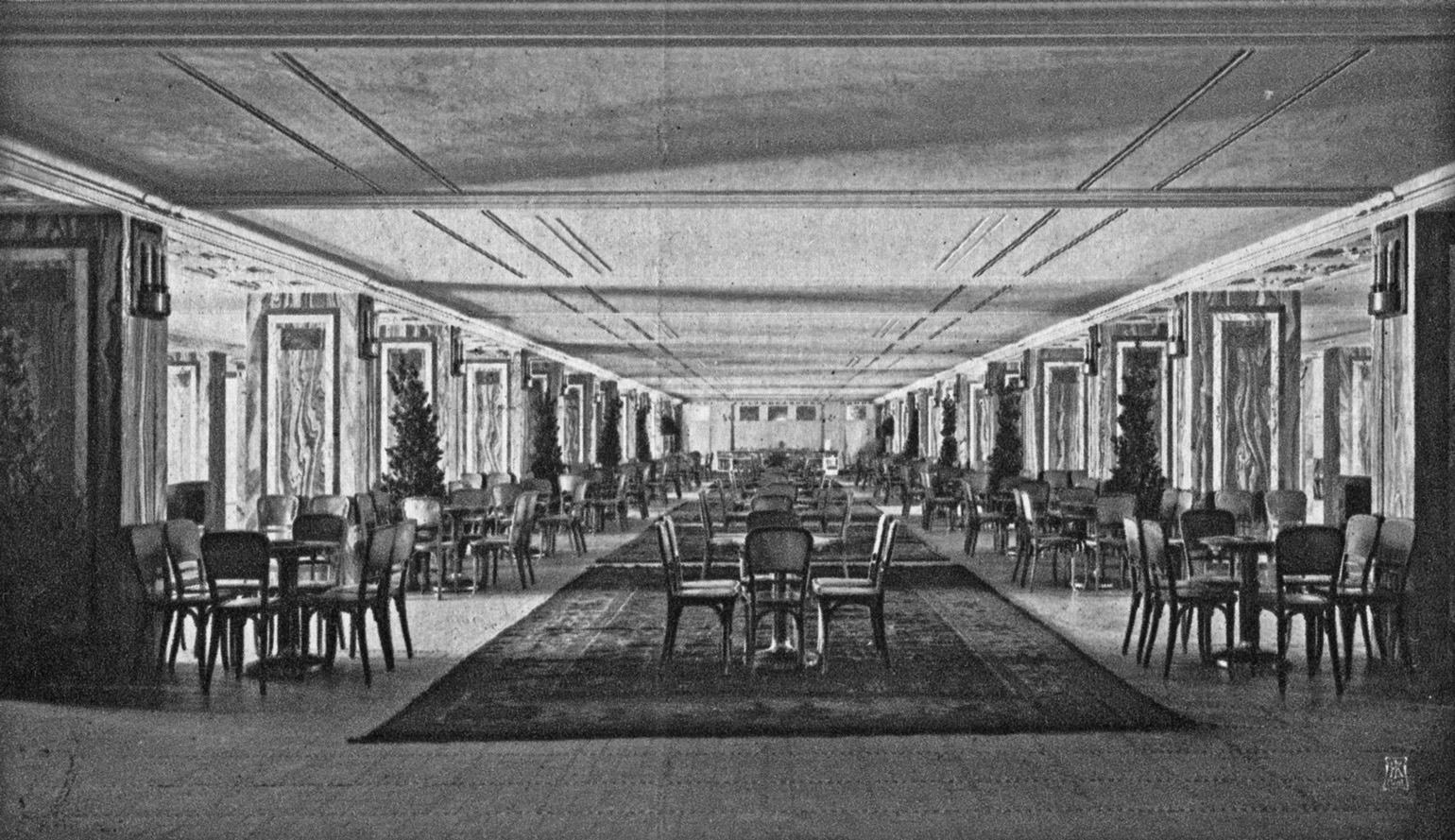
Café in the cloakroom vestibule

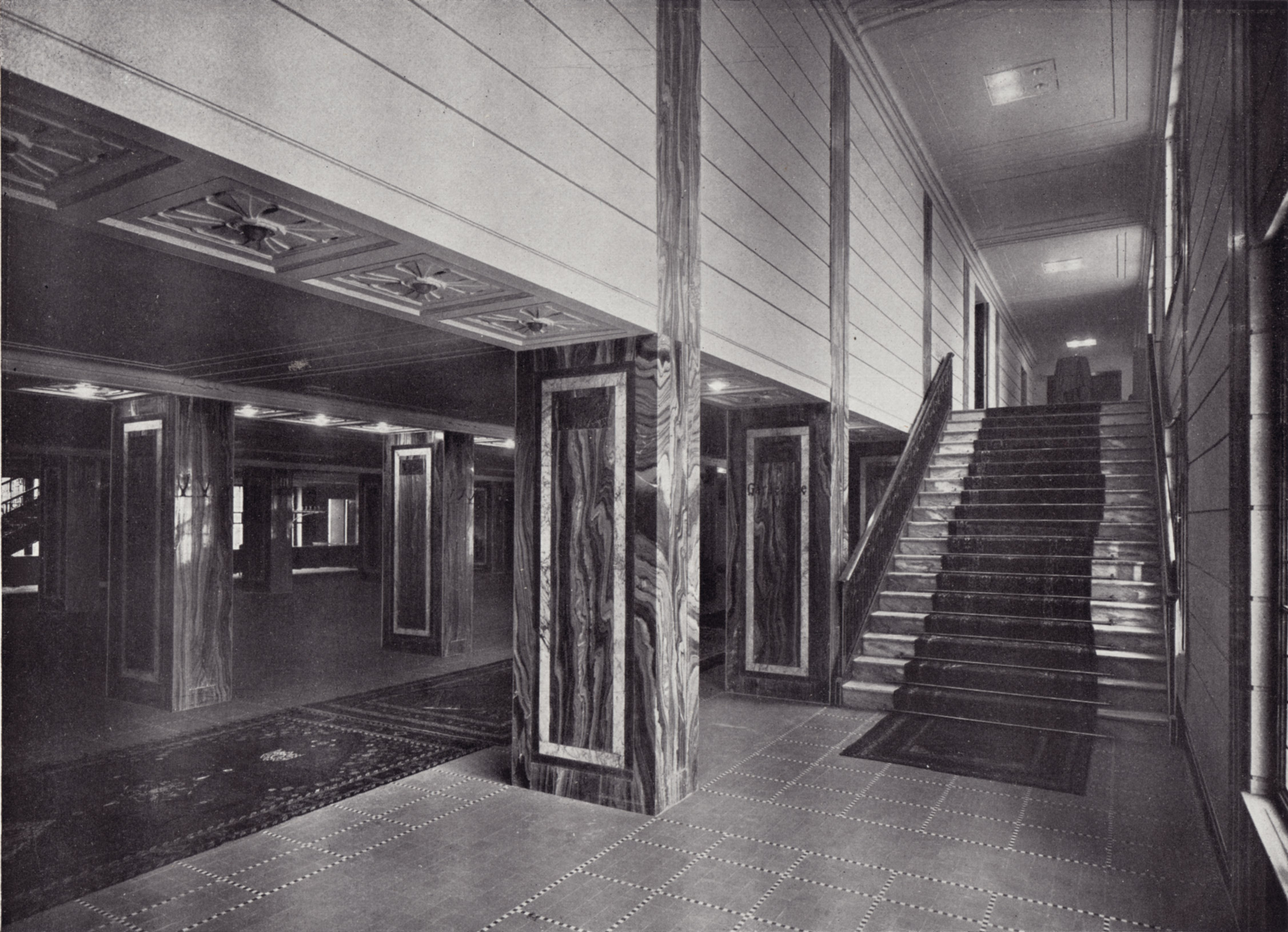
Cloakroom vestibule with one of the stairs to the Emperor's Hall

The hall above on the cloakroom floor again occupied the entire story except for the stairs and the toilet facilities accessible from the staircases. In the original plans, the room was to serve as a foyer for the cloakroom of concert visitors, but could also fulfill the same function for banquets in the large banquet hall on the same floor. After the planning change, Aschinger set up a café and an American bar there. The huge room received, due to its rather subordinate purpose in the original plans, only a height of 2.80 meters. Like the pillar hall, four rows of pillars structured the room, supporting the floor of the Emperor's Hall. Greek Cipolline marble with Skyros marble inlays clad the pillars and marble tiles covered the floor. At the ends of the huge room ended the marble stairs coming from the pillar hall. They continued in four single-flight stairs on the long sides, ending under the side galleries of the Emperor's Hall.

==== Emperor's Hall ====
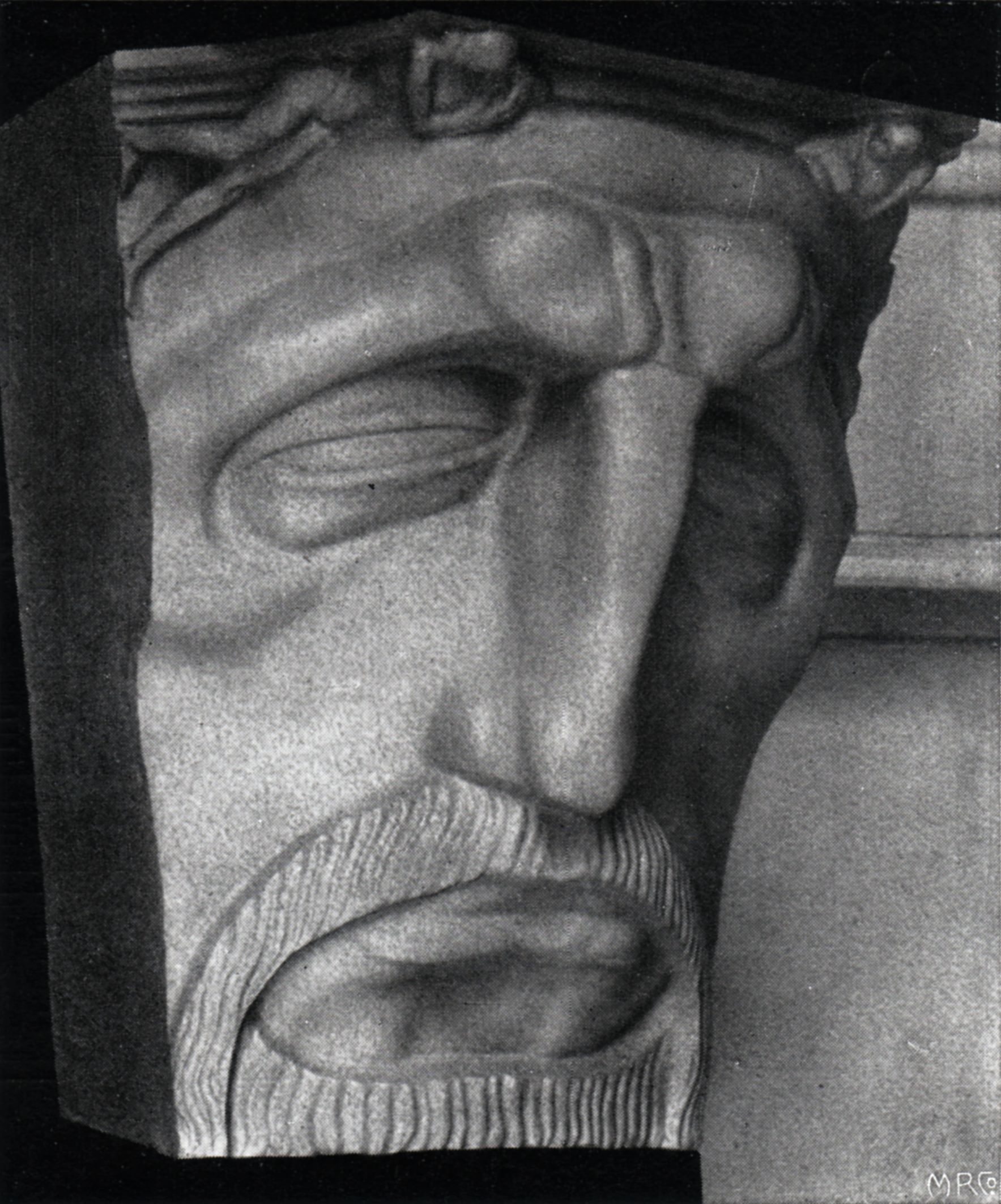

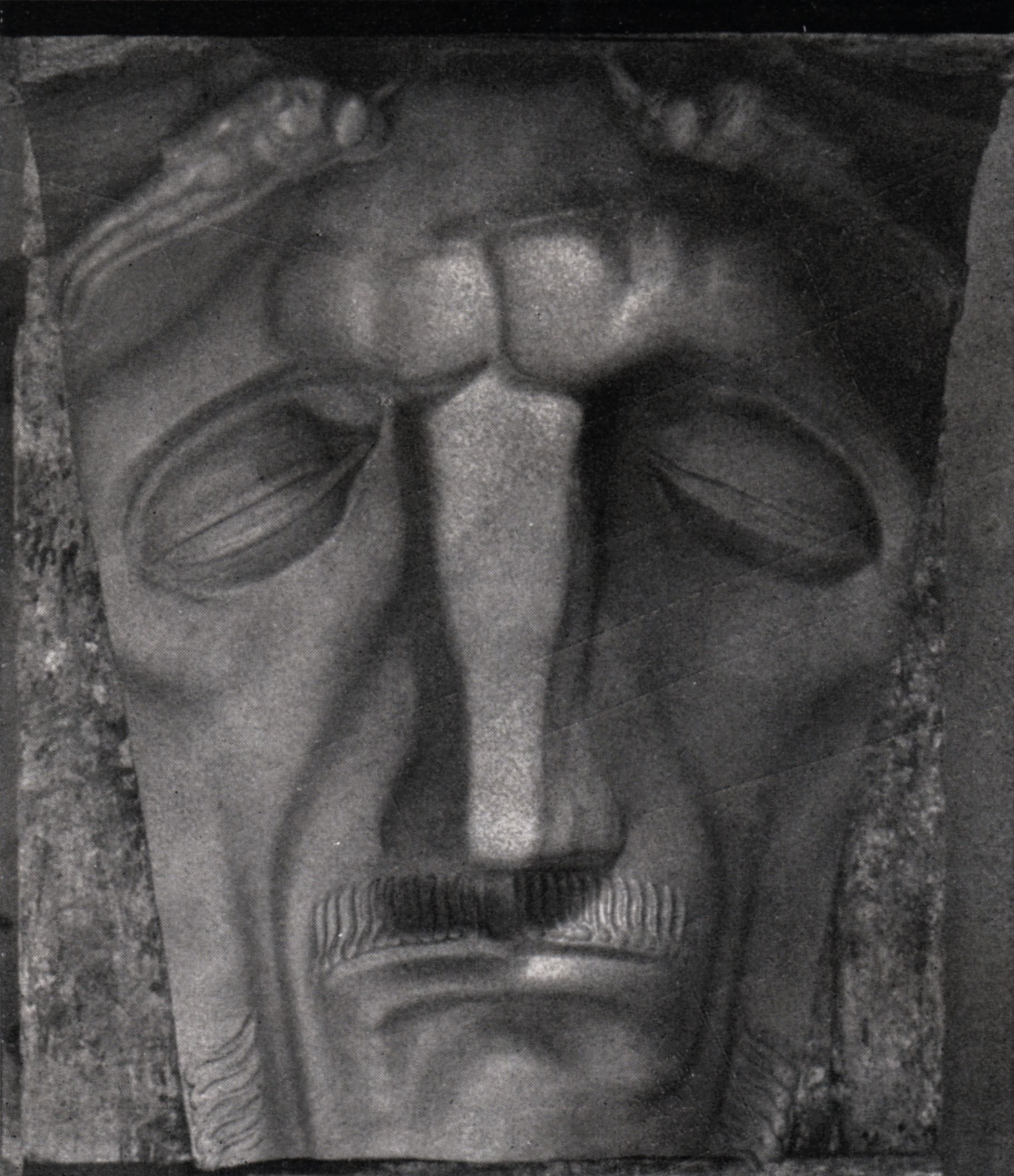

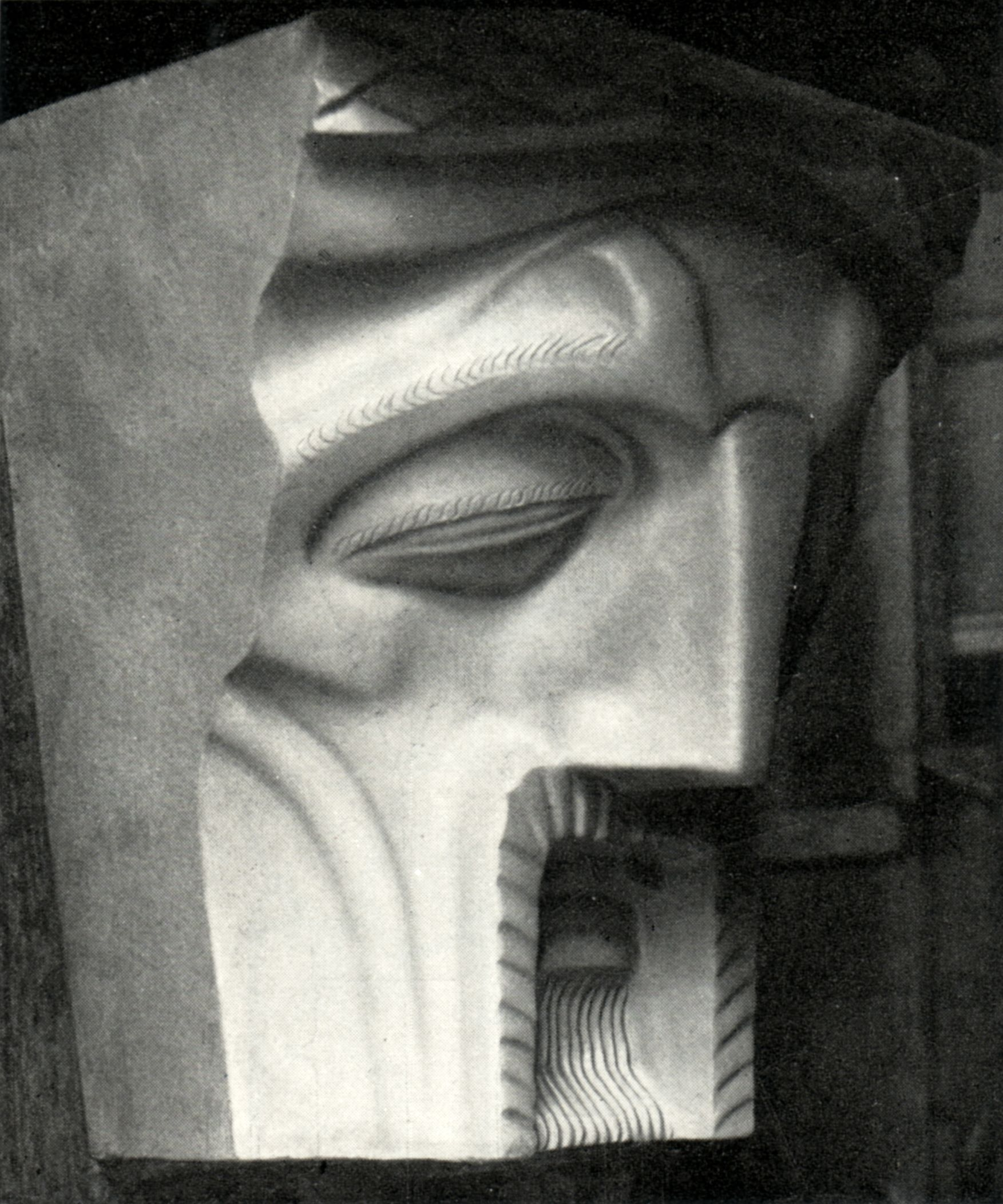

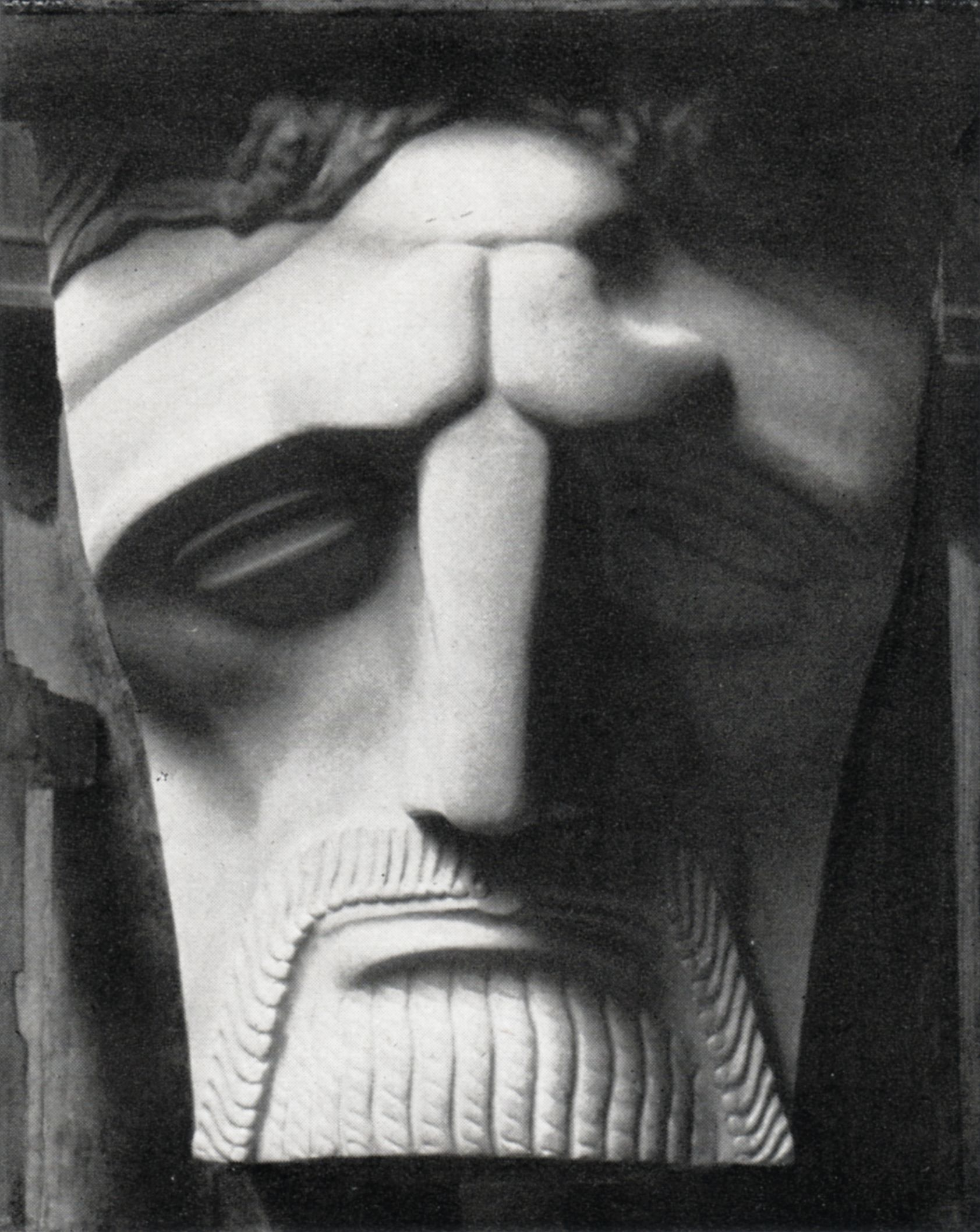

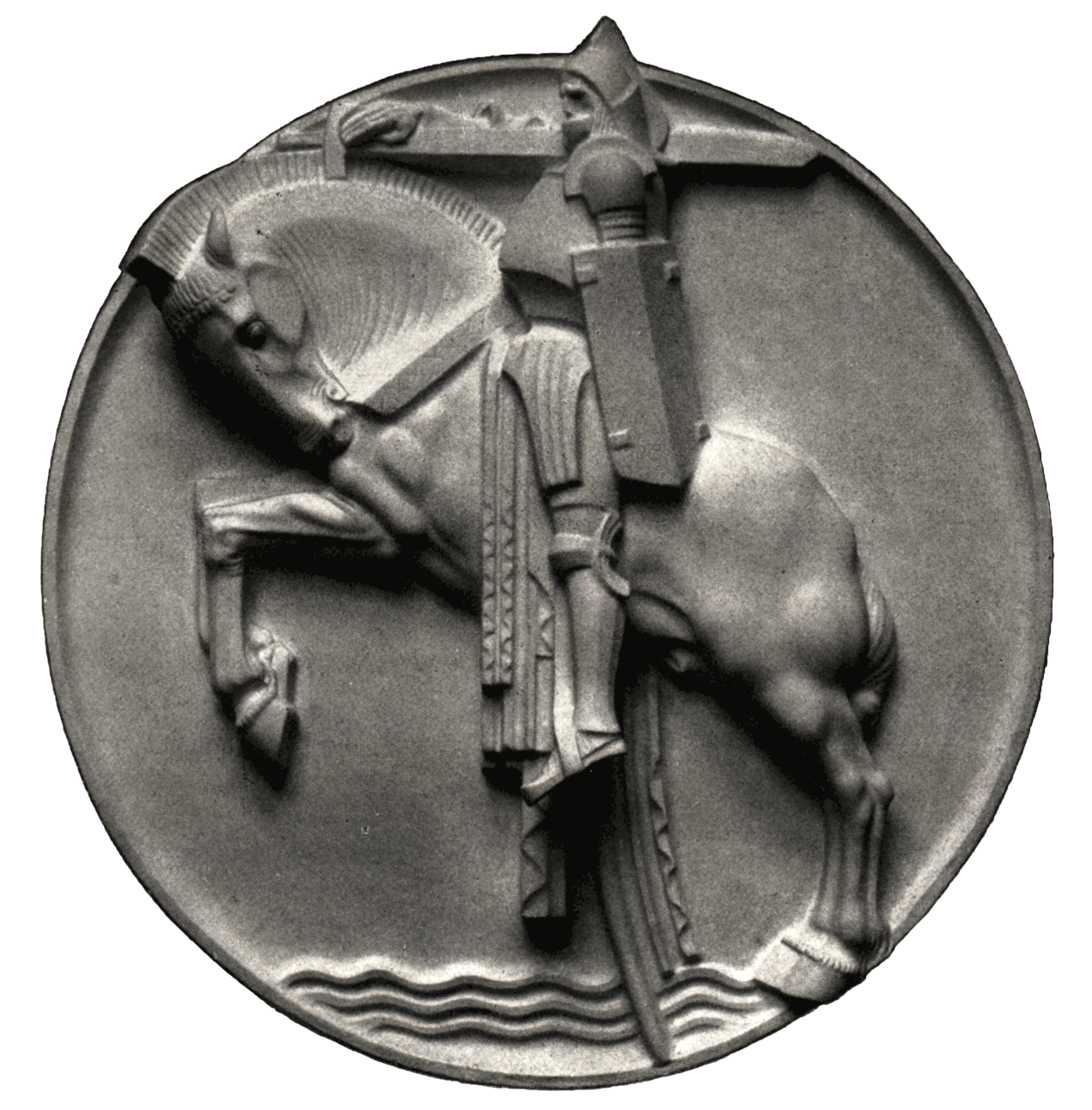

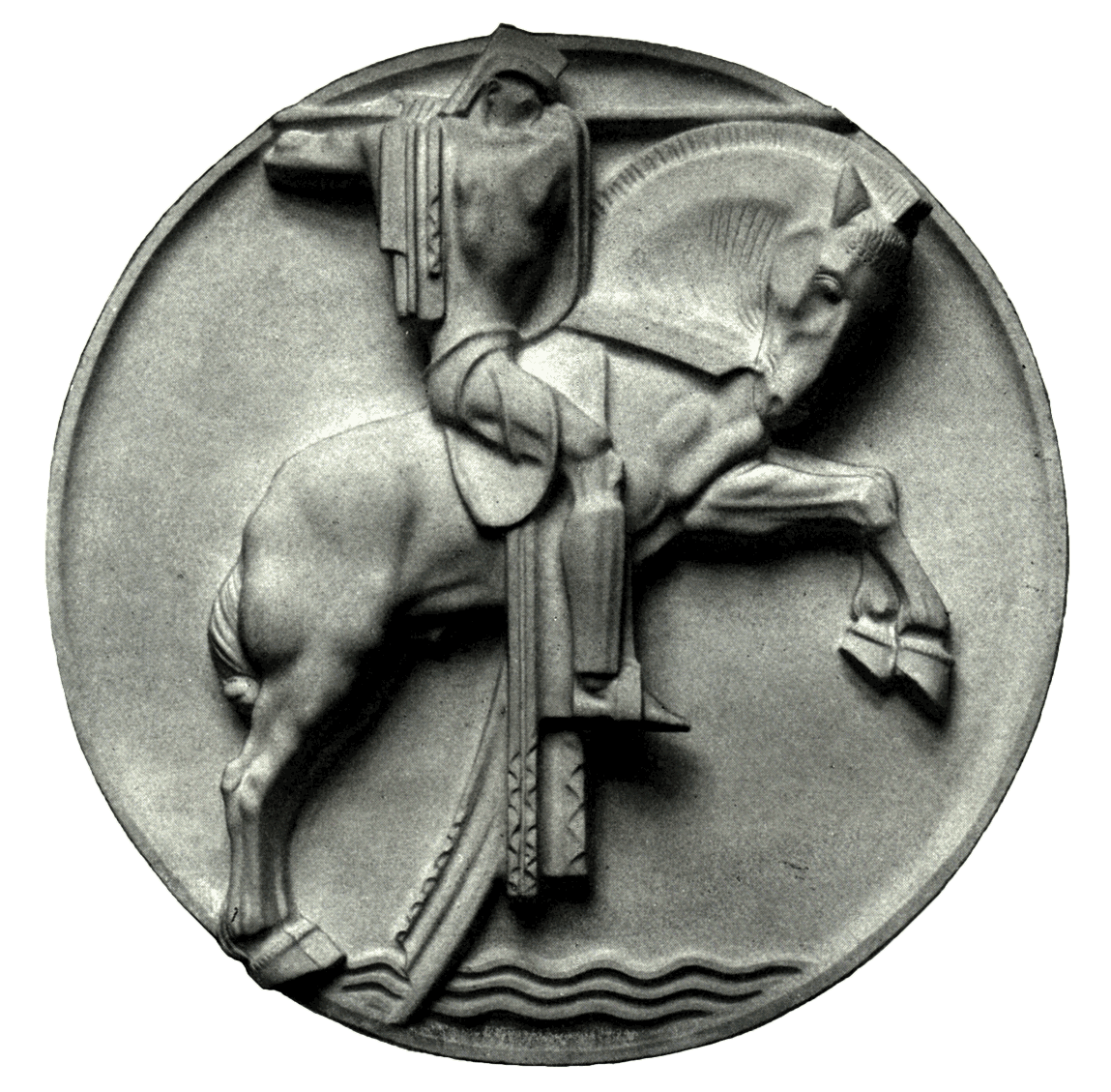

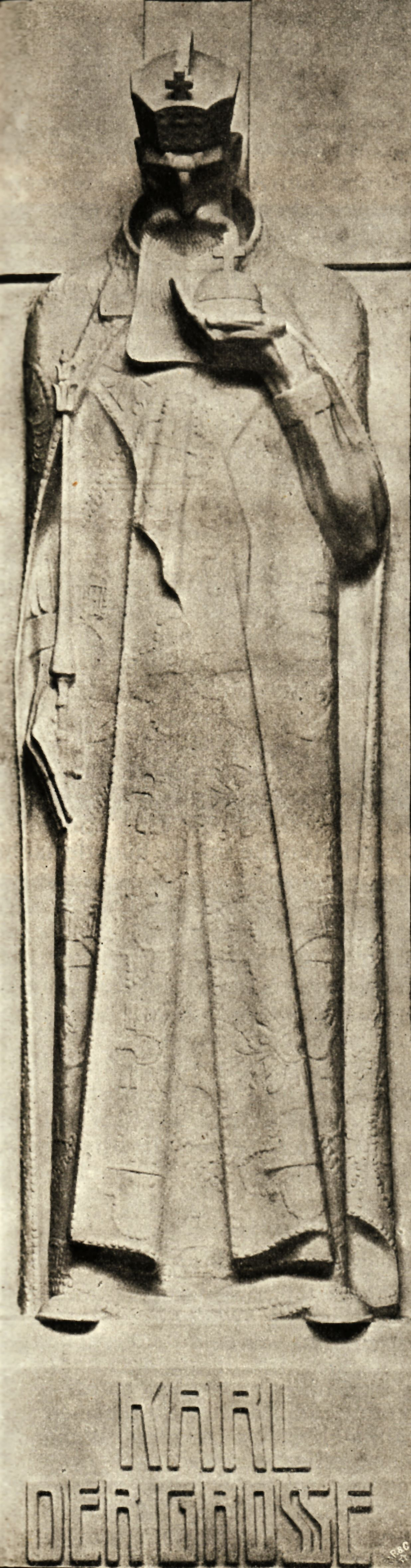

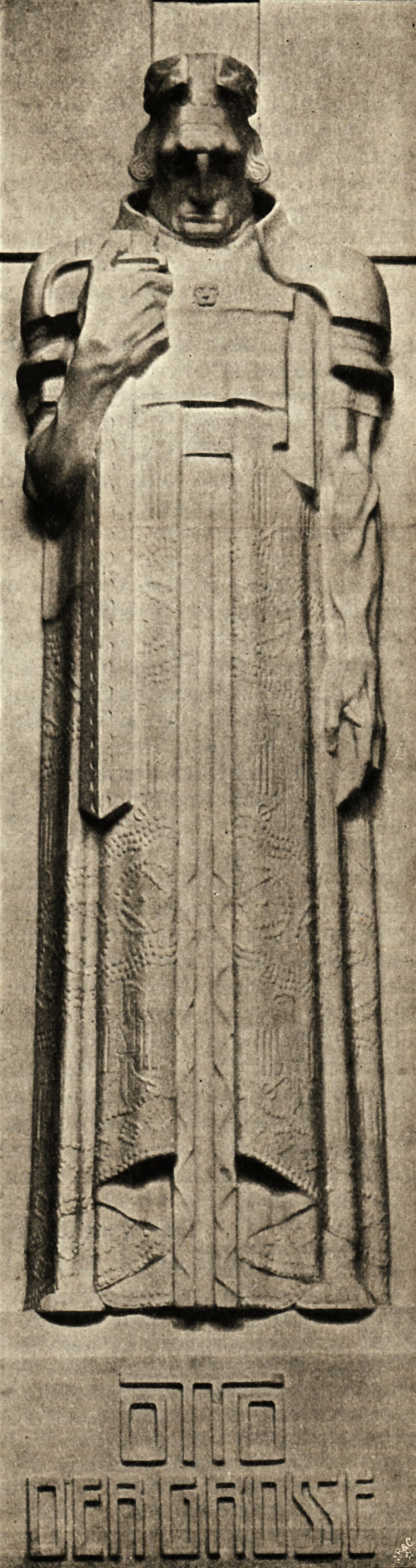

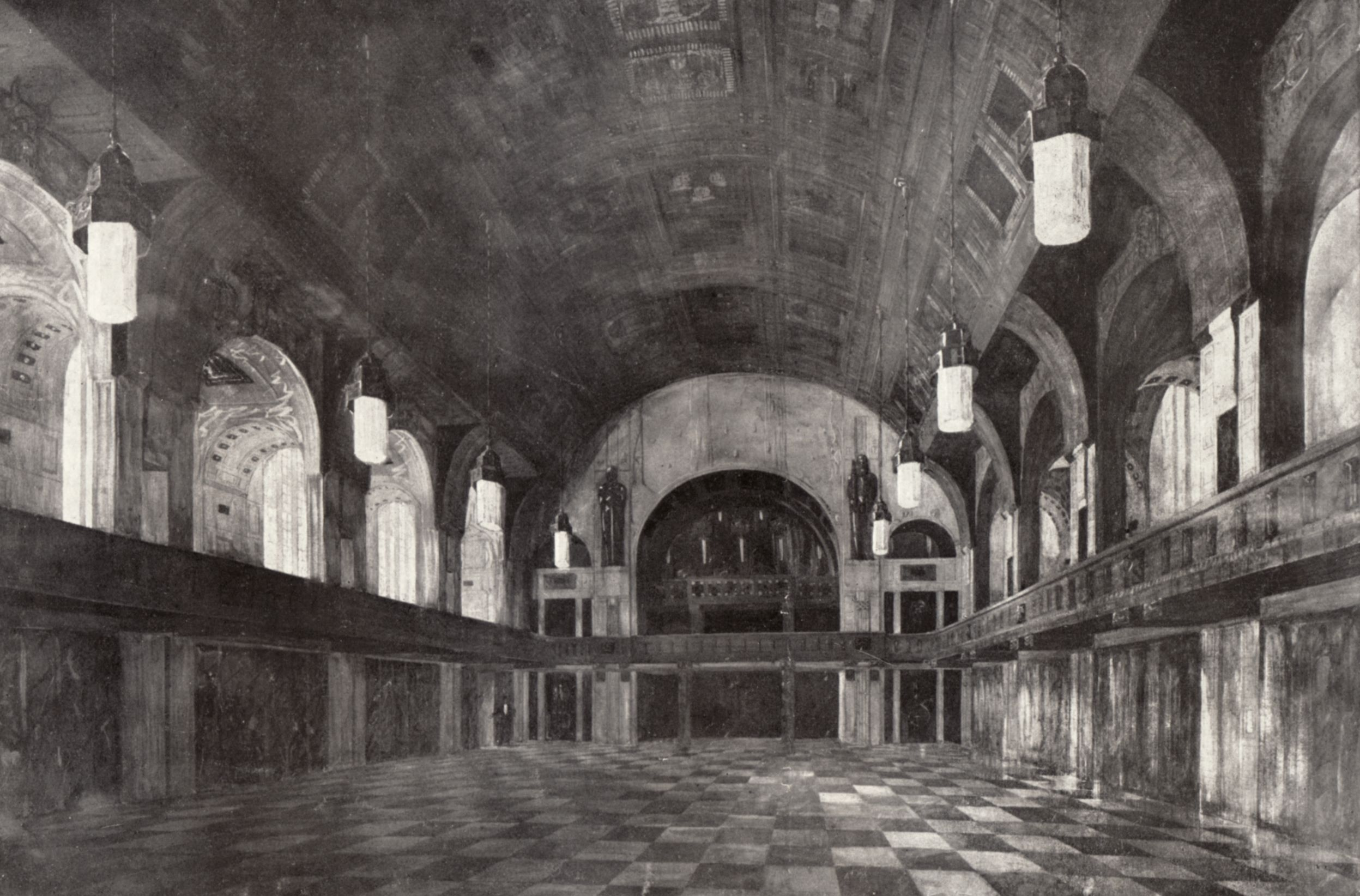
Emperor's Hall – design by Bruno Schmitz

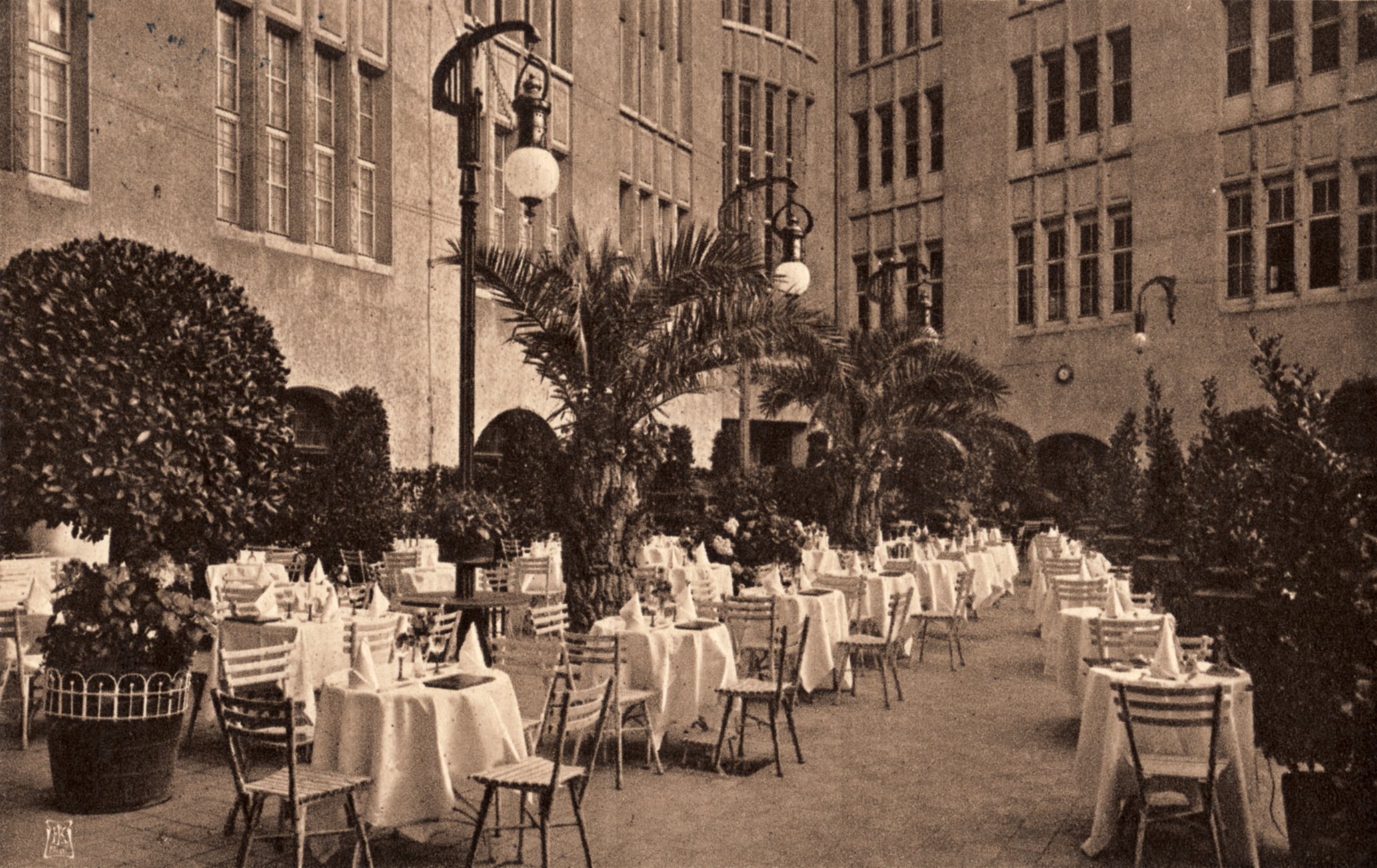
Courtyard view

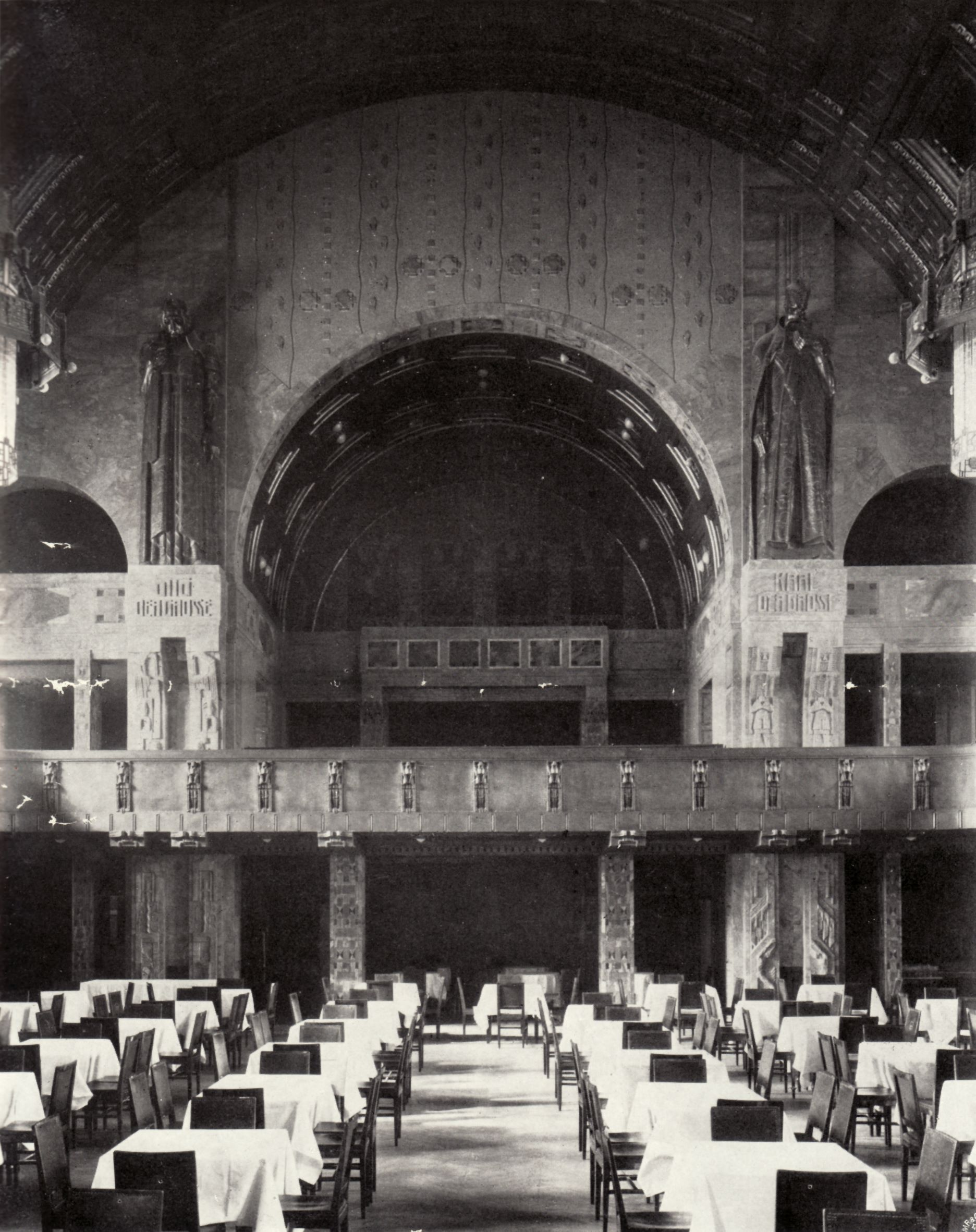
View

On the hall floor – 9.45 meters above the level of Bellevuestraße – lay the "Emperor's Hall", the "crowning part of the entire building complex". The largest room in the house with 17.46 meters width and 35.0 meters length was originally planned for concerts and events. After the concept change imposed by the building police, it served as a restaurant with over 1,000 seats.

A barrel vault structured by large flat coffers and girders of gilded stucco spanned the approximately 11.2 meter high hall in the longitudinal direction and protruded far into the steel structure of the roof truss. With regard to use as a concert hall, Bruno Schmitz had chosen a double construction. Behind the visible inner shell of wire plaster was hidden an outer, fireproof shell of masonry. Numerous openings in the inner ceiling allowed sound to enter the cavity between the ceilings, which was to serve as a resonator. Through the same openings, exhaust air also escaped. Two rows of five large chandeliers each made of metal and colored crystal glass in medieval forms hung from the ceiling.

The vaults over the round arch windows were not cut into the main vault as usual lunettes. Only the girders of the barrel vault continued to the pillars, while the wall surfaces over the cut-in vaults were led vertically upward and horizontally covered. Schmitz designed the wall surfaces with expressive keystones, flanked by two spandrel medallions each with knight figures – both designed by Franz Metzner.

On the hall floor, a walkway surrounded the "Emperor's Hall" on all four sides. On the long sides, the stairs from the cloakroom vestibule as well as the staircases on the front and courtyard sides led into it. The deeper narrow sides additionally accommodated ancillary rooms such as toilet facilities or the buffets for the restaurant. On the 3.65 meter higher gallery floor, the Emperor's Hall expanded on the long sides by these areas, while the gallery protruded about one meter into the hall. The gold-colored balustrade of the gallery was structured by bronze knight figures set forward as balusters.

On the two narrow sides, two niches vaulted by a barrel vault adjoined, accommodating an orchestra loge at the height of the attic. The gold mosaics in the orchestra niches with the four huge imperial eagles were supplied by the company Puhl & Wagner from Berlin-Neukölln. Toward the courtyard side, two ancillary rooms found space. Their counterparts in the attic served, fitting the adjacent orchestra loges, for storing instruments.

Four emperor figures – Charlemagne and Otto the Great as well as Frederick Barbarossa and Wilhelm I – framed the eastern and western niches on consoles. The figures, further works by Franz Metzner, executed by G. Knodt in Frankfurt, marked for the magazine Der Profanbau again "the utmost limit of an artistic daring, without however exceeding it". And further: "It looks as if the corpses of Charles and Otto the Great, Frederick Barbarossa and Emperor Wilhelm had been fetched from the sarcophagi and nailed up there on the wall."

As one of the few rooms in the house, the room received a parquet floor. The lower wall surfaces were covered with large slabs of flamed, yellowish-brown Faune-de-Sienne marble, interrupted by the tall rectangular grilles of the air inlet openings made of hammered bronze. The upper wall surfaces were clad with slabs of grayish Napoleon marble, which received its name after Napoleon's gray coat.

The defining materials marble, gilded stucco and bronze led to a "truly gigantic or majestic spatial effect" with a "solemn and mystically tinted sublimity". The Deutsche Bauzeitung spoke of "one of the most significant hall creations of recent times" and explicitly included in the comparison the "White Hall" of the Berlin Palace rebuilt with interruptions by architect Ernst von Ihne between 1892 and 1902. Aschinger's prestige object could thus quite compete with the splendor of the Emperor's residence palace.

=== Building wing on Potsdamer Straße ===
==== Facade on Potsdamer Straße ====
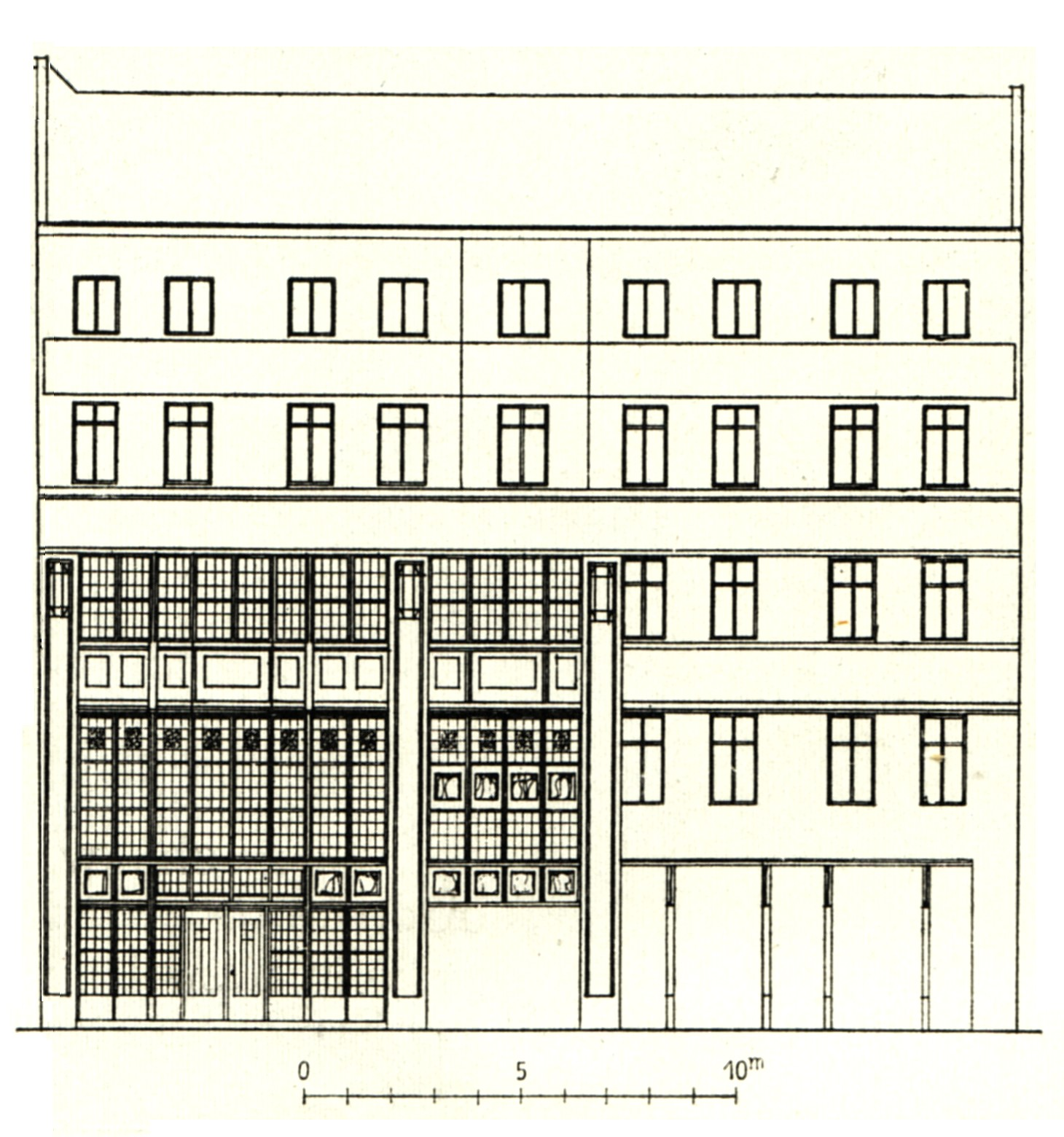
Design of the overall facade Potsdamer Straße 3 with old and new part, execution partly deviating

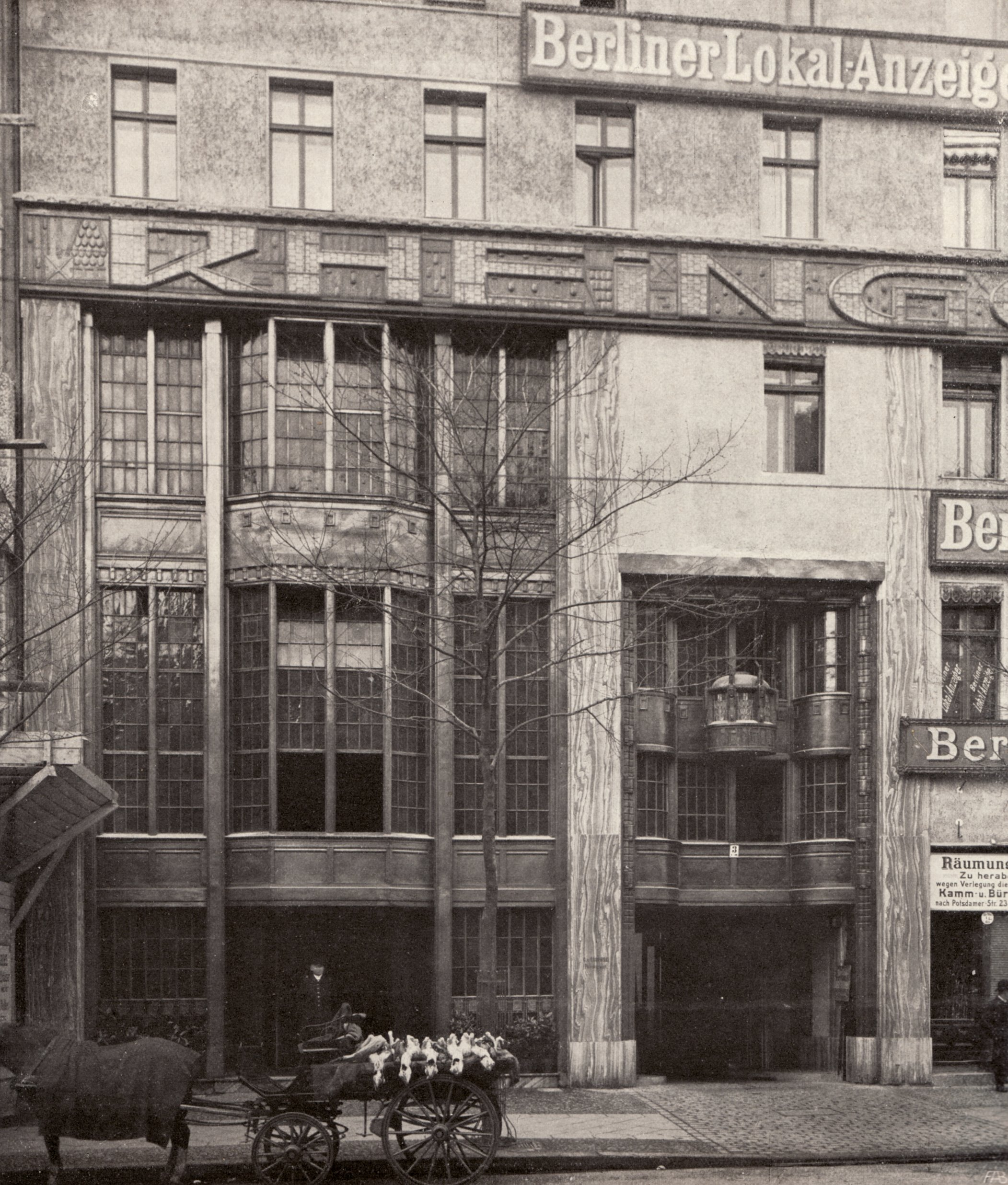
View Potsdamer Straße 1907

In contrast to Bellevuestraße, Bruno Schmitz had only limited design possibilities for the facade on Potsdamer Straße, as the old house could only be partially demolished due to the tenants. The redesign was thus limited to the new building area, i.e. the lower left part of the facade up to the second upper floor and the area above the driveway to the courtyard.

Schmitz set off the facade part of the Weinhaus from the rather neutral existing facade with its lined-up windows and simple plaster by elaborate and colored materials such as bronze, copper and marble. Eleven meter high pillars clad in green-flamed white marble framed the entrance to the Weinhaus Rheingold and the driveway. The marble for the pillars running from the ground floor to the second upper floor was supplied by the Aktiengesellschaft für Marmorindustrie Kiefer in Berlin. Above, the copper inscription "RHEINGOLD" running over the entire length of the facade of 22.5 meters on an approximately 1.1 meter wide cornice advertised the restaurant. The area between the pillars was resolved by Bruno Schmitz into large windows with bronze frames and narrow muntins, protruding bay window-like over the entrance. New for Berlin was the double elevator system, which transported guests directly from the street to the second upper floor on the left and right in front of the recessed entrance.

The architectural critics and journalists regarded this facade in 1907 as provisional and born of necessity. Hans Schliepmann even defends the architect with the words: "Even a god could not have created a work of art from such a house, on which the most abominable company signs still have a unfortunately all too well-secured right to screech for years." A reconstruction, however, never took place later, certainly also as a result of the lacking economic success. Externally, this facade differed little from the numerous reconstructions after the turn of the century, where old houses received modern facades for shops in the lower floors, even if in this case a new building was actually hidden behind the facade. The architectural historian Julius Posener therefore sees parallels between this facade on Potsdamer Straße and the facade of the retail premises of the bentwood company Jacob & Josef Kohn at Leipziger Straße 40 designed in 1906 by the Austrian architects Josef Hoffmann and Koloman Moser.

==== Shell hall ====
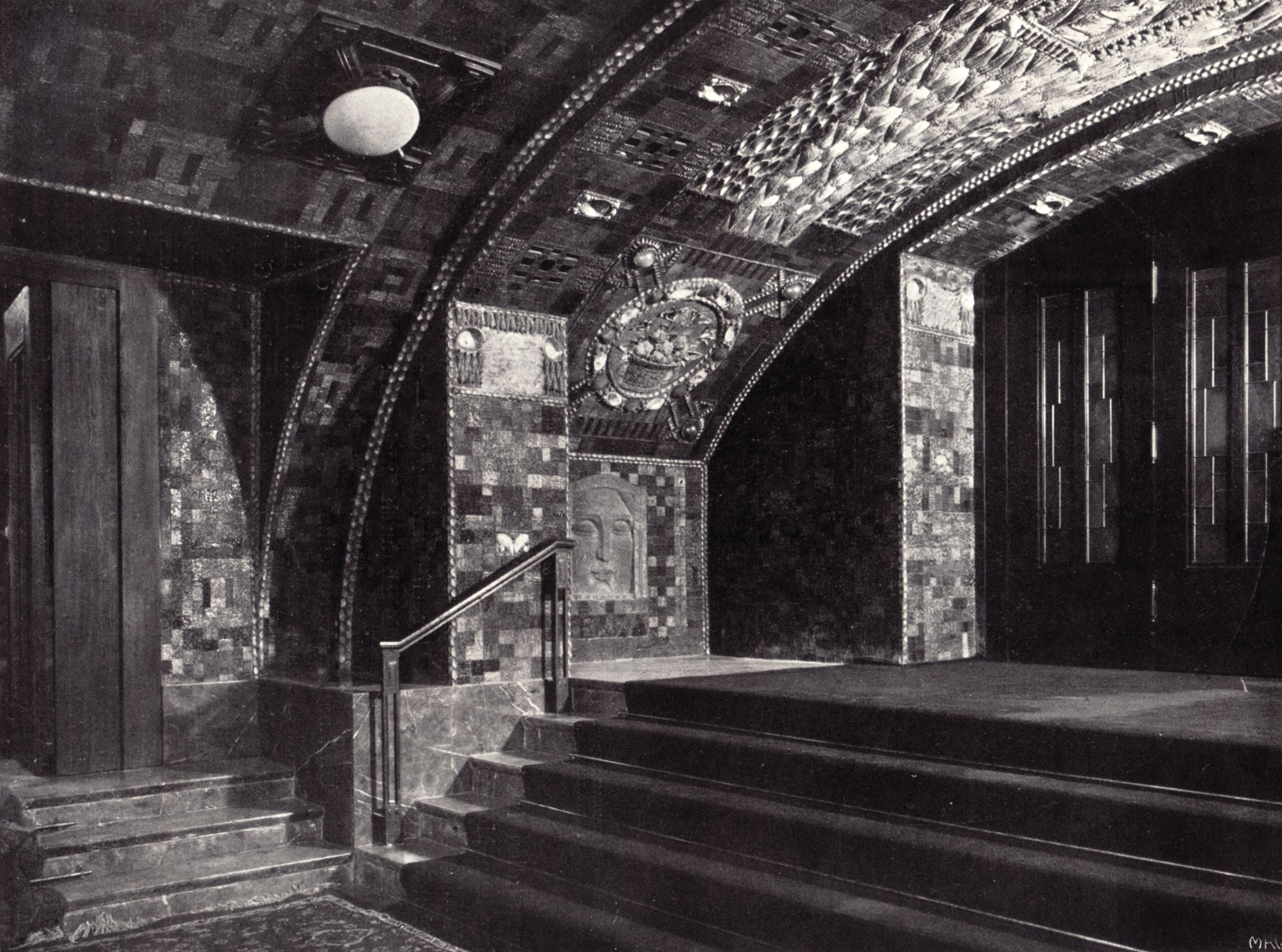
Shell hall, transition to the lower rotunda

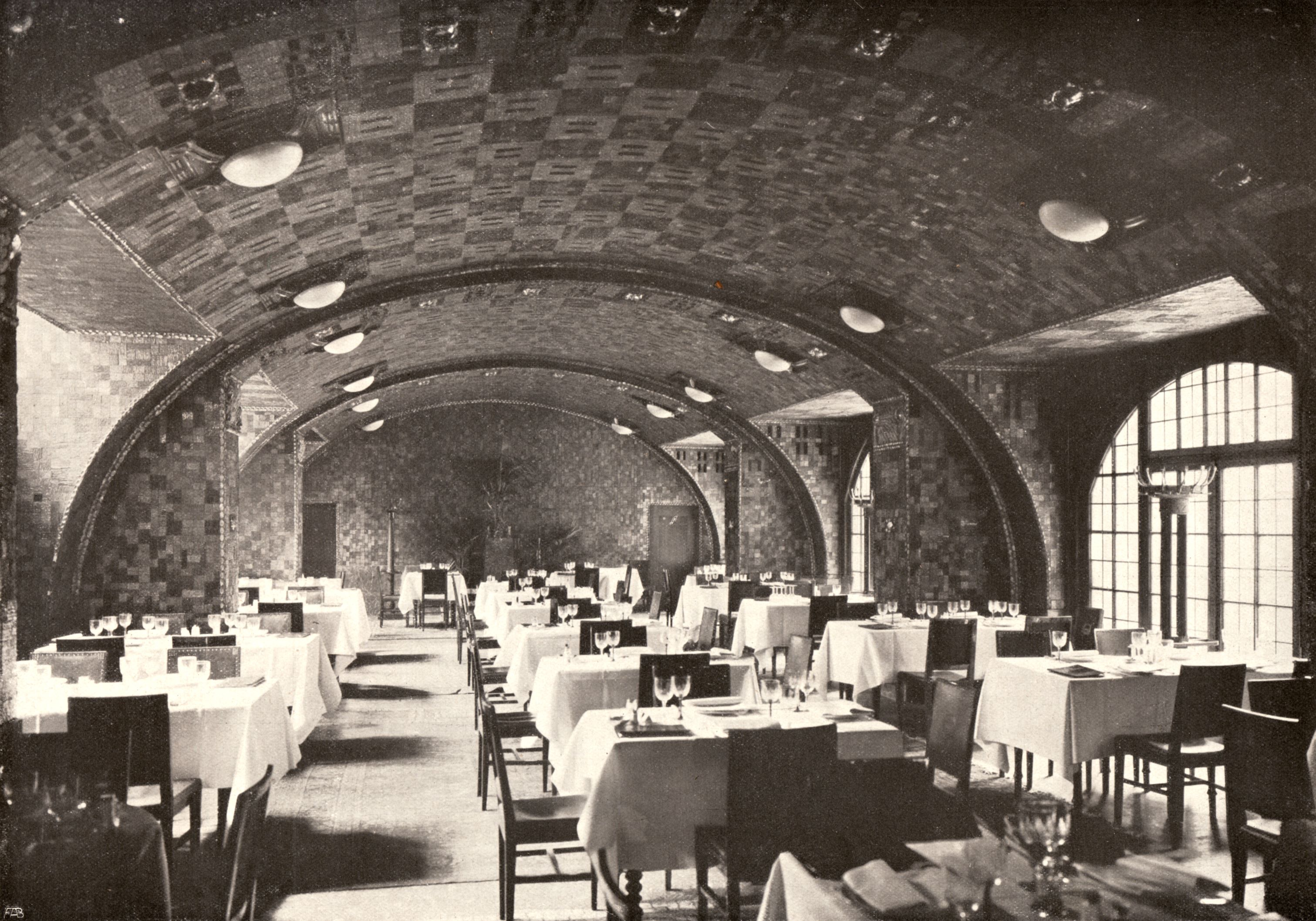
View of the shell hall 1907

The shell hall lay 2.20 meters below the level of Potsdamer Straße. The 7.65 meter wide and 17.28 meter long hall lay in the rear part of the tract. Visitors reached it via a wide staircase framed with gold mosaics from the gallery hall or via the driveway, which led over to the "Stone Hall" in the connecting tract. Corresponding to the location in the foundations of the building, Bruno Schmitz chose heavy building forms. A large barrel vault starting directly above the marble mosaic floor supplied by the company Johann Odorico spanned the room longitudinally and reached a height of approximately 3.7 meters at the apex. The tongue walls and windows cutting laterally into the vault, however, revealed the heavy vault as a wire plaster construction. The windows could be completely sunk into the floor and expanded the hall in warm weather onto the artistically designed courtyard. A simple small wall fountain of polished limestone on the closing rear transverse wall was the only sculptural ornament of the room. Behind it were a ladies' toilet and a secondary staircase. The hall received its name from the shells that, together with greenish and brownish-red shimmering glass tiles, clad vault and walls. These incrustations were executed by the Munich-based company C. Ule, the stair treads and marble bases of the walls were supplied by the Aktiengesellschaft für Marmorindustrie Kiefer in Berlin. The barrel vault rising directly from the floor with the incrustations reminded critics of a grotto of a pleasure palace from the 17th or 18th century, but the heaviness of the architecture also of a crypt or dungeon. The "cool golden sparkling splendor, originating from the colored glass fluxes" with their "fairy tale magic" could also be associated with "gnome king's throne room" from Peer Gynt.

==== Vestibule on Potsdamer Straße ====
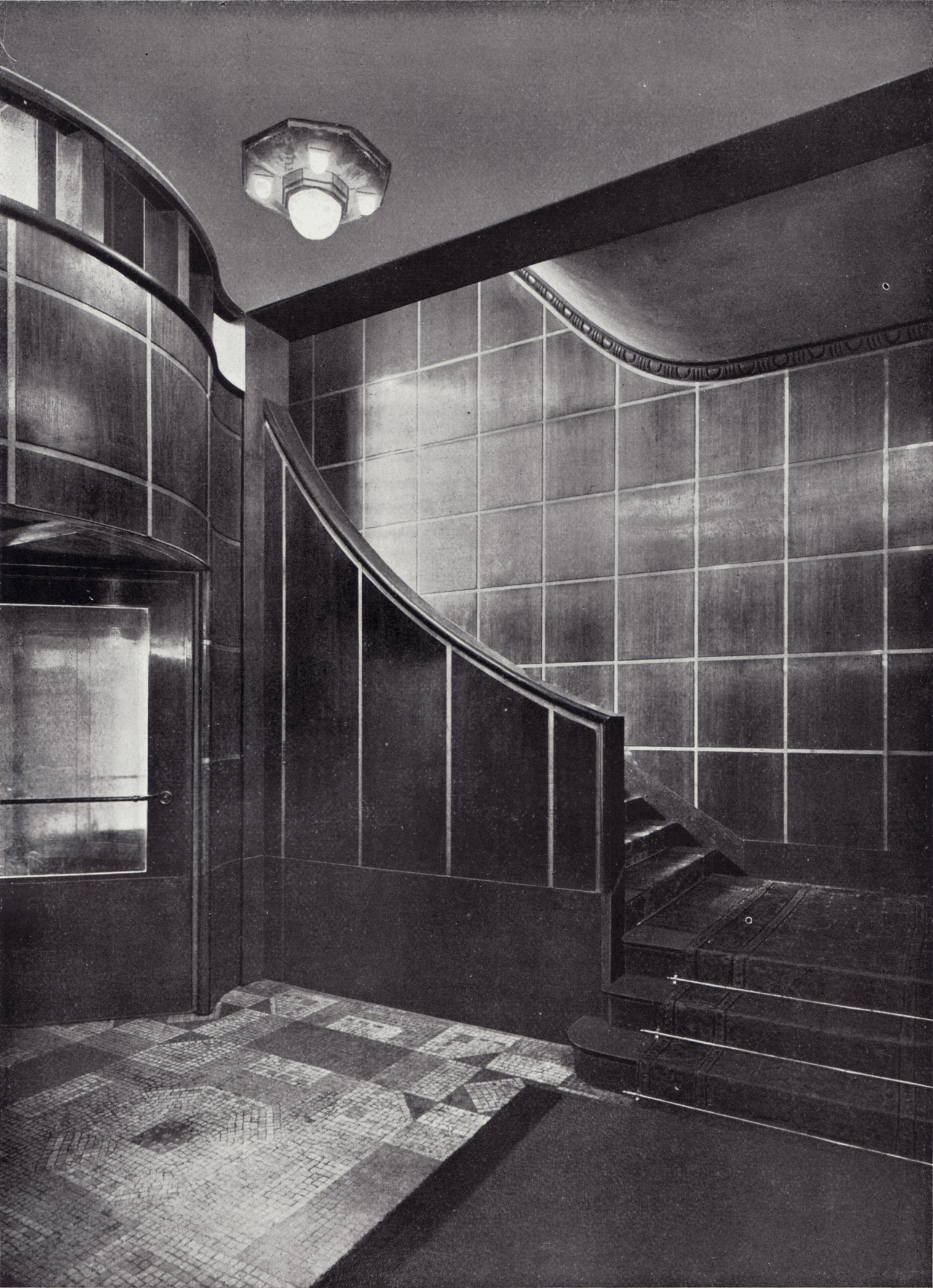
Vestibule

The vestibule extended over all three floors used by the Weinhaus in the front building on Potsdamer Straße. It offered visitors several ways to reach the halls of the Weinhaus. New in Berlin was the double elevator system already mentioned in the facade description, supplied by the Maschinenfabrik Carl Flohr in Berlin, which transported guests directly from the street to the two upper floors. If visitors entered the house through the revolving door, an elegantly curved staircase accessed the upper floors. A mosaic floor covered the ground floor, walls and staircase were clad with walnut wood and structured by lighter wood into squares.

==== Gallery hall ====
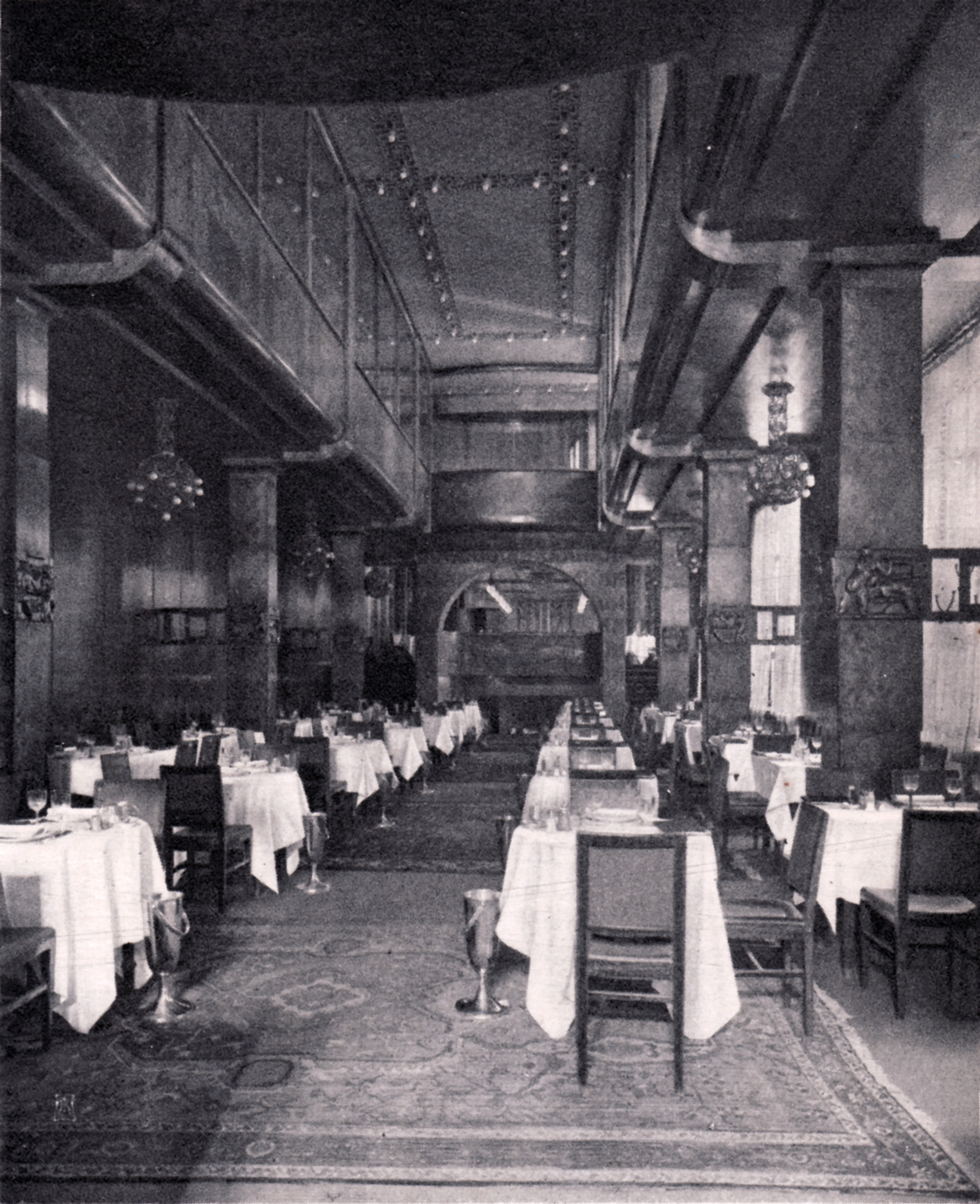
Gallery hall in view direction of the mahogany hall

The first gastronomy restaurant room that visitors entered from Potsdamer Straße was the "Gallery Hall" on the ground floor. Corresponding to its significance as an entrance room, the 7.92 meter wide and 19 meter long hall with a height of around 7.4 meters extended through two stories. The gallery running at 4.5 meters height, accessible only from the vestibule and not from the room itself, gave the hall its name. Schmitz designed the interior finishing of the hall with wood, executed by the art carpentry Otto Salzmann & Sohn in Berlin-Kreuzberg. The polished, dark brown-red rosewood of the walls with inlaid intarsia of multicolored woods and mother-of-pearl contrasted with the lighter, flamed birch wood that clad the wooden pillars and the smooth balustrades of the gallery as well as the ceiling. The pillars received rather discreet sculptural ornament through gilded reliefs by Hermann Feuerhahn. Glazed walls separated the gallery from the hall and protected the guests sitting above from smoke and drafts. The rear room closure formed a staircase of dark marble, which contrasted effectively with the gold mosaics executed by the company Johann Odorico on walls and stair cheeks. The middle staircase led down to the "Shell Hall", the two outer stair runs up to the "Mahogany Hall". Etched windows decorated with flower garlands gave "the hall a mood that cannot be thought more sympathetic".

==== Mahogany hall ====
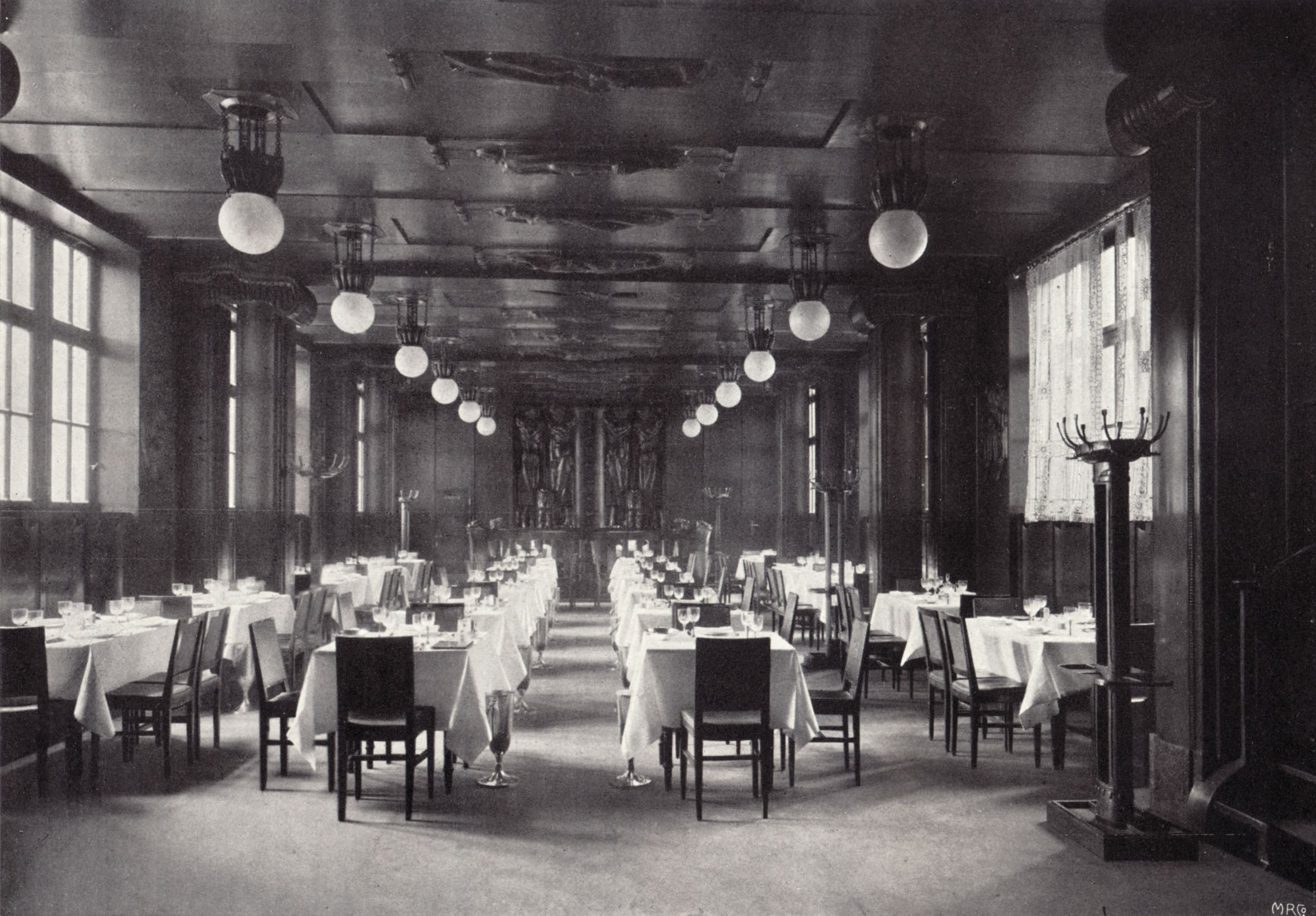
Mahogany hall

The adjoining "Mahogany Hall" lying 1.84 meters above the level of Potsdamer Straße could be reached from the gallery hall via a double-flight staircase. The connection to the rotunda of the connecting wing lay at the same height. The hall received its name from the dark, bordeaux-colored wall and ceiling paneling of mahogany, manufactured by the furniture factory W. Kümmel in Berlin. Wall pillars with volute capitals structured the 7.92 meter wide and approximately 27 meter long room by separating 4.8 meter wide niches at windows on the long sides. The central ornament was a life-size wood relief by Franz Metzner on the rear narrow wall of the hall, additionally emphasized by a platform in front of it. It showed the "love life of the sexes, characterized in such a way that the lustful woman strides on bird claws, and the lecherous man on goat feet, in front of it sits a phantom of common ugliness, a child of sin." Hermann Feuerhahn was also involved in the decoration of the room with the "poesy-full symbols" on the ceiling and the "exotic representations" on the long walls.

==== Ebony hall ====
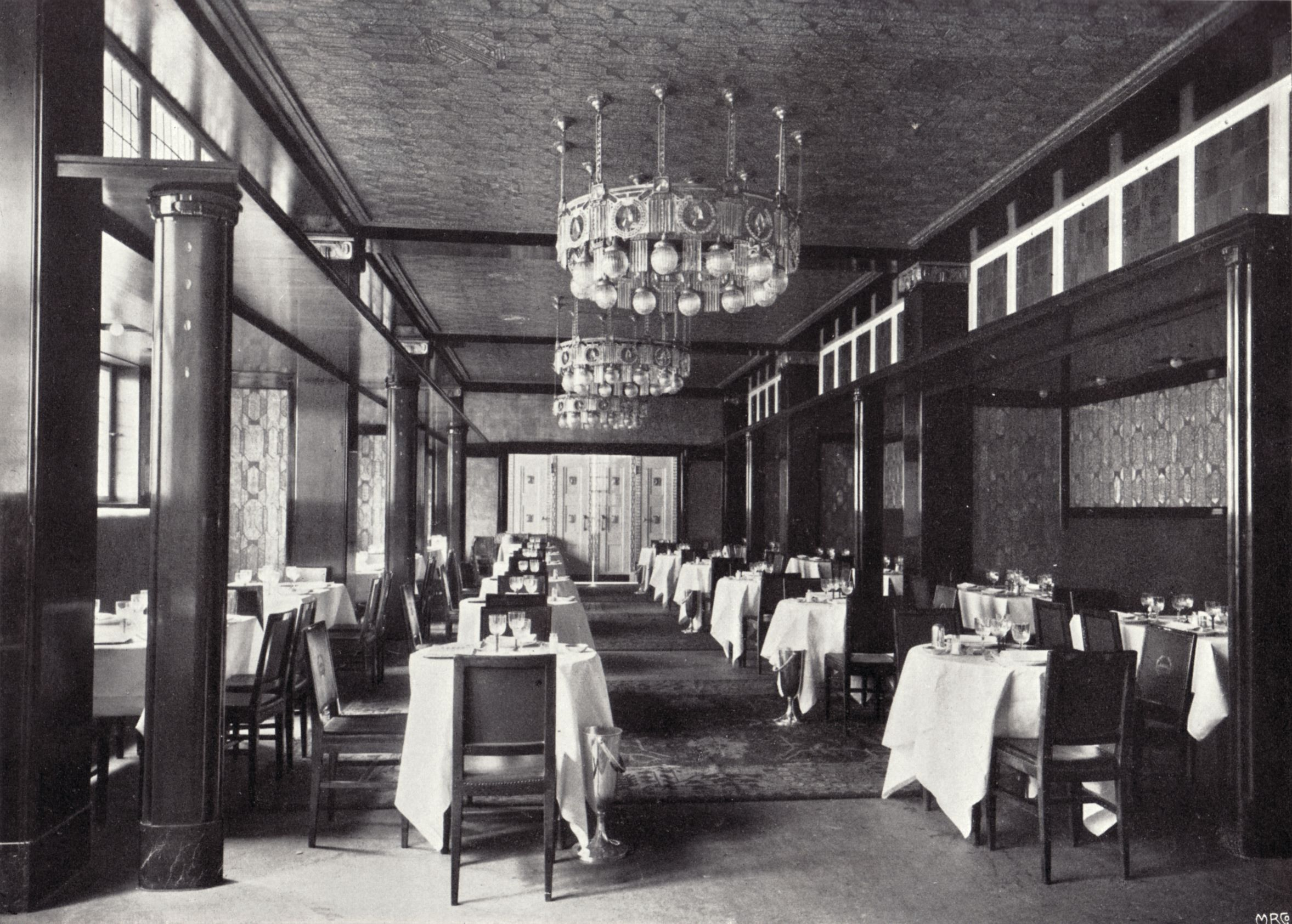
Ebony hall, in view direction to the vestibule on Potsdamer Straße

The "Ebony Hall" extended on the cloakroom floor almost over the entire length of the tract on Potsdamer Straße. The excess height of the gallery hall with its gallery on the ground floor led to the overlying half of the ebony hall lying around 1.8 meters higher than its counterpart above the mahogany hall. The two hall halves, also slightly different in height with 3.6 and 3.9 meters, were connected by a wide staircase. The main access to the hall was via the vestibule on Potsdamer Straße as well as through the lower rotunda, but it could also be reached from the gallery of the gallery hall via two stairs. Projecting pillars clad with Indonesian ebony from Makassar separated 4.8 meter wide boxes and structured the elongated room. In the "Ebony Hall", Schmitz dispensed with sculptural design; the "unspeakable nobility" of the hall was defined by the pillar and wall claddings of the noble Makassar ebony "of a curiously warm and soft tone", the ceiling in silver comb painting and the elaborate chandeliers of the Baccarat crystal manufactory. The art carpentry works were executed by the company Georg Kuhnert in Berlin.

=== The connecting wing ===
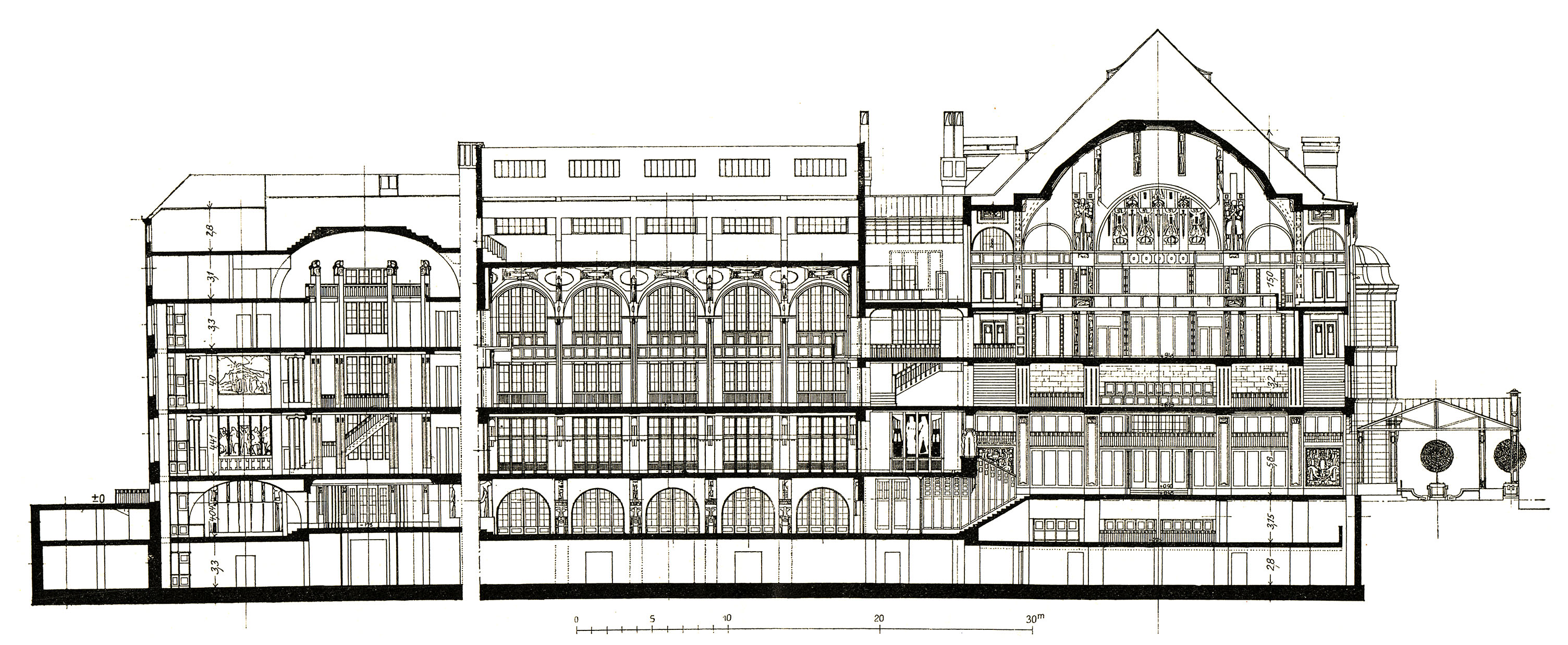
Section through the side wing, from bottom to top: "Stone Hall", "Red Hall", "Onyx Hall" and "Banquet Hall", left the rotunda, right section through the wing on Bellevuestraße

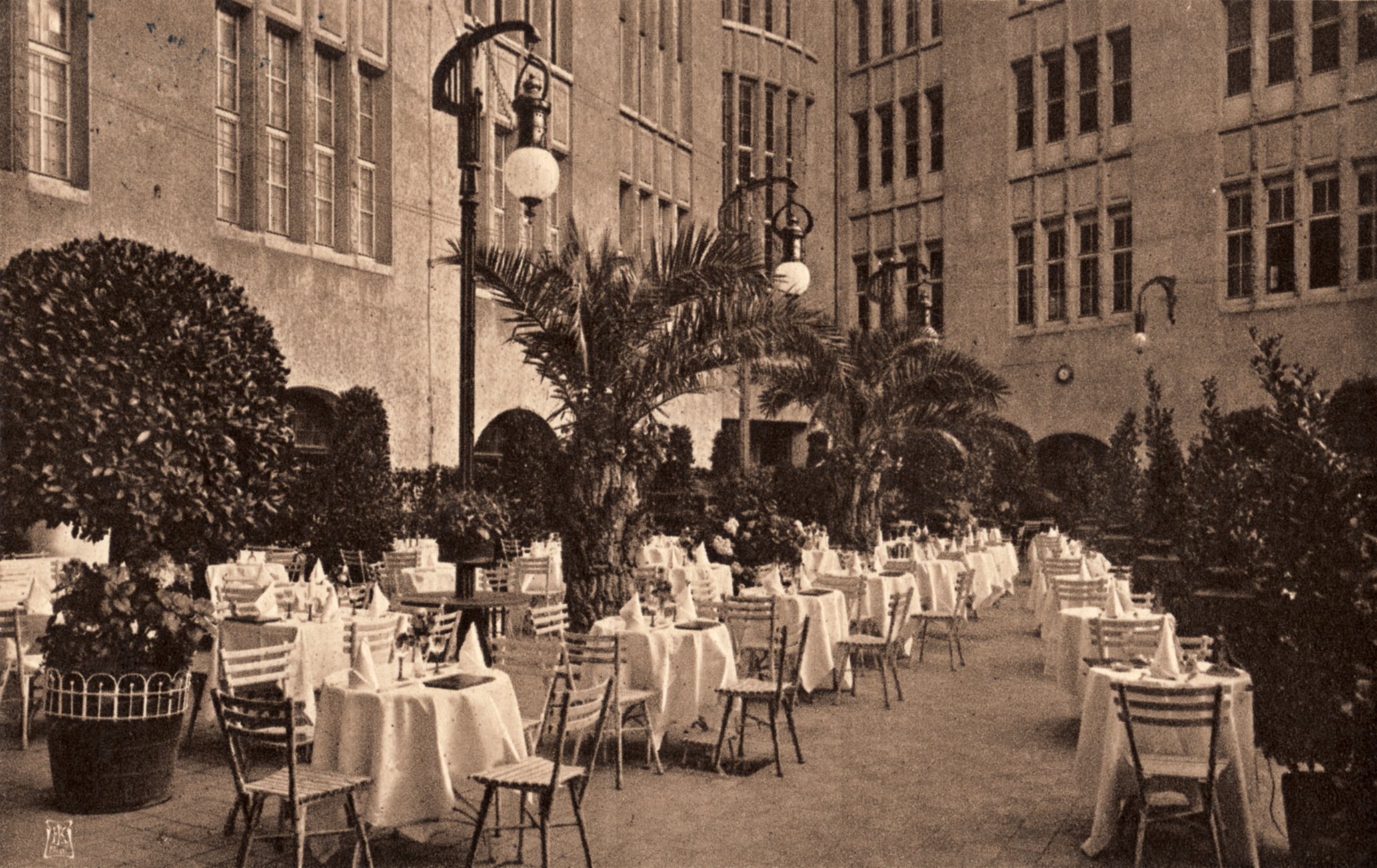
Courtyard view

The connecting wing connected the hall building on Bellevuestraße with the wing on Potsdamer Straße. It led in the central axis of the hall building to the tract on Potsdamer Straße, with a rotunda mediating between the different axes. The ground floor was raised by half a story relative to the street tracts to allow the building police required driveways to cross the connecting wing twice and still enable visitors a continuous floor from Potsdamer to Bellevuestraße. The tract served exclusively gastronomic purposes and had its own kitchen in the attic for supplying its restaurants.

Located inside the property, its facades toward the three adjoining courtyards were simply designed and corresponded to the rear facades of the street wings. The floors of all courtyards were covered with non-slip grooved tiles and the courtyard toward the Grand Hôtel Esplanade received design through lanterns with elaborately designed masts, as it served in warm weather as an outdoor extension of the adjoining halls. Potted plants such as date palms and laurel trees greened the courtyard.

==== Stone hall ====
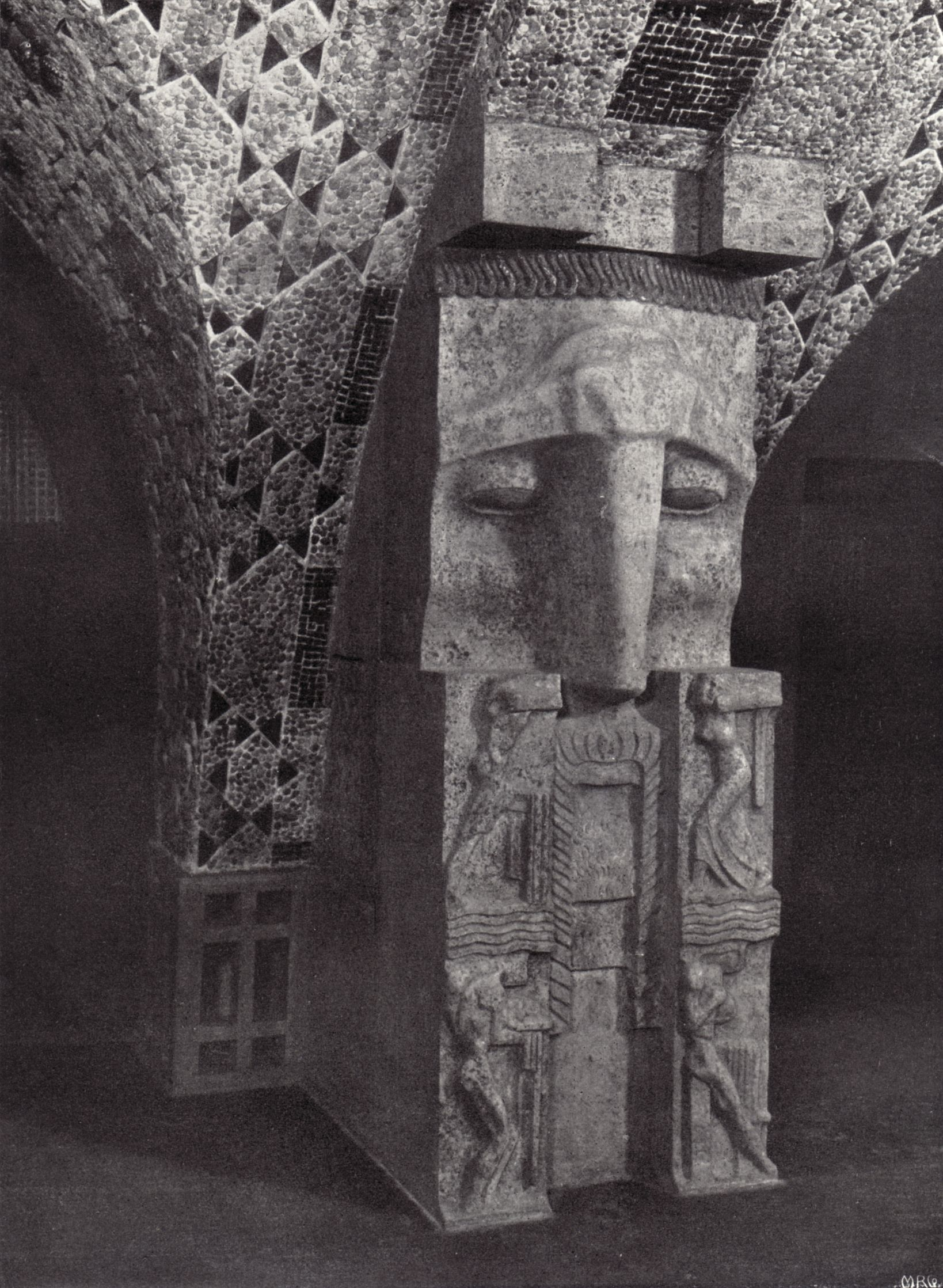

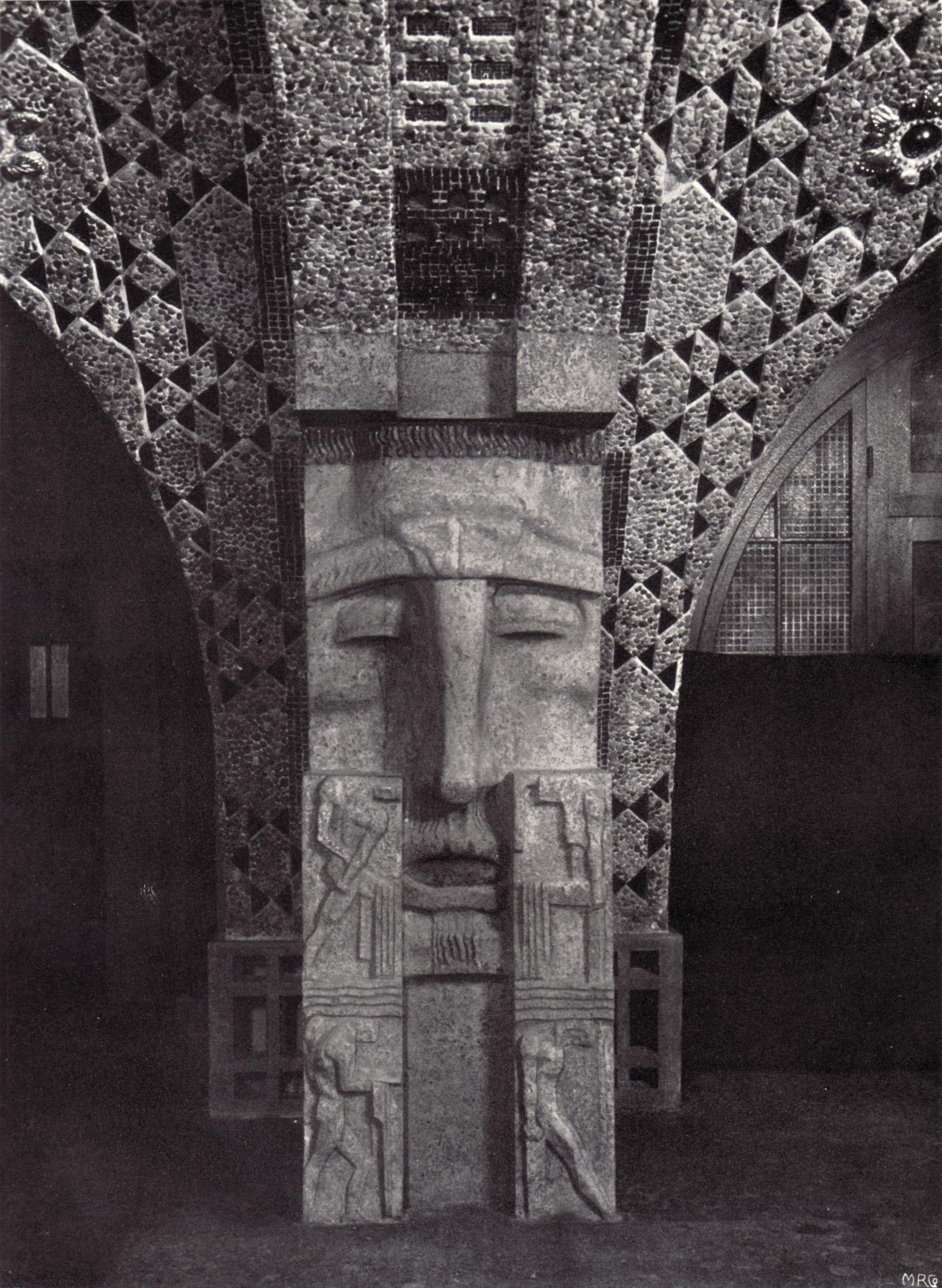

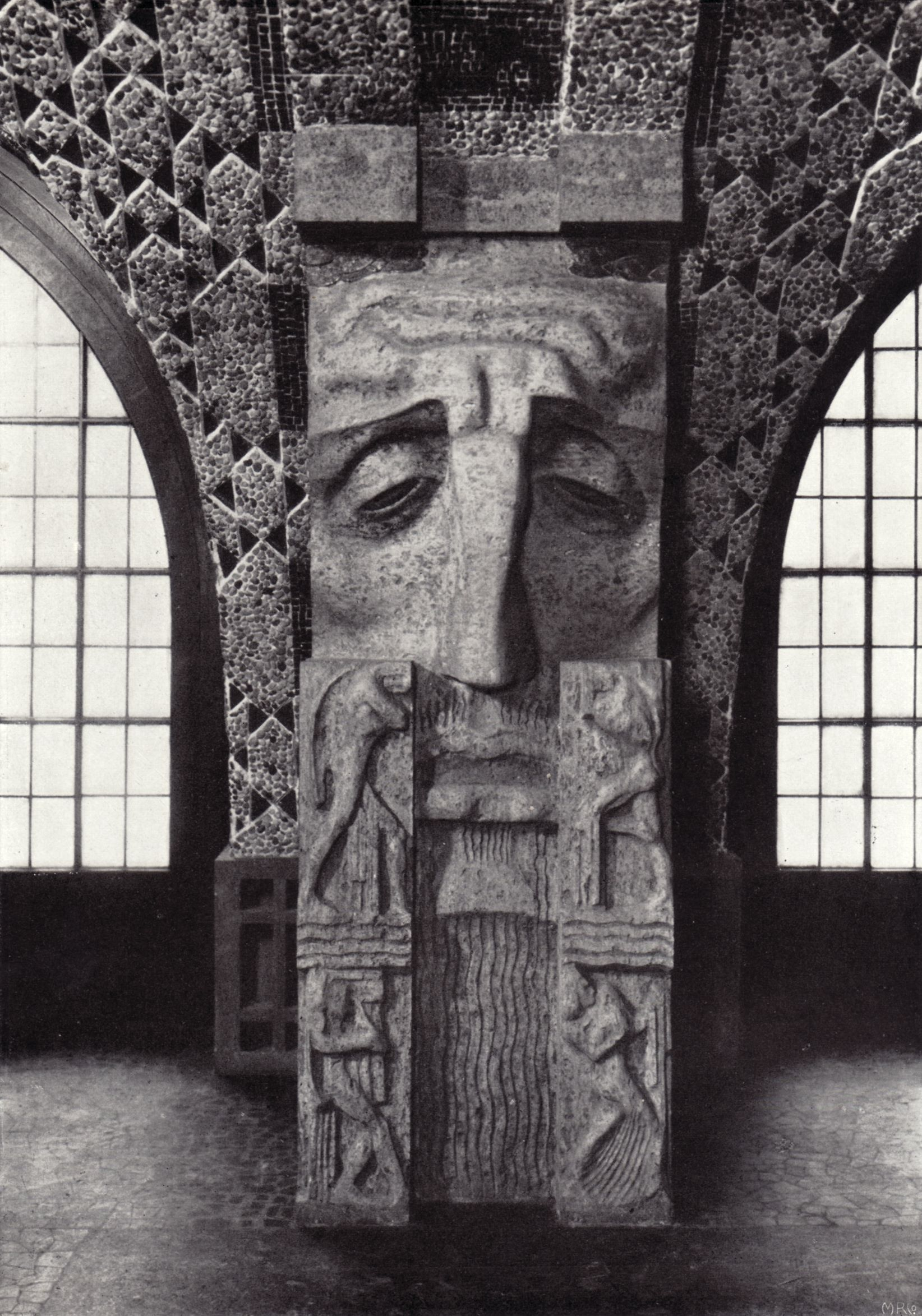

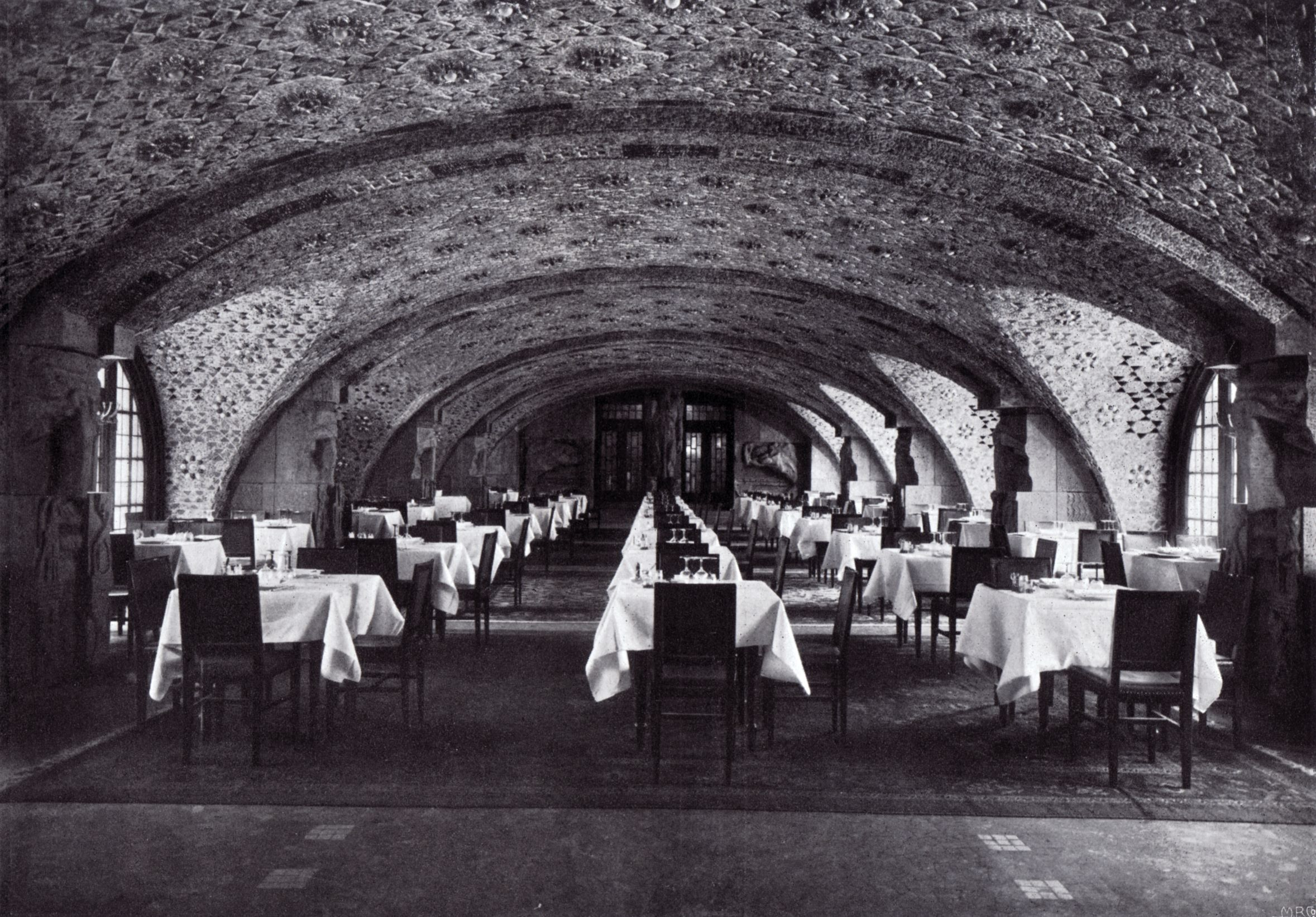
View

The Stone Hall, also called Wotan's Hall or Odin's Hall, lay 2.20 meters below the level of Bellevuestraße. It could be reached via a staircase from the Pillar Hall of the main building on Bellevuestraße and had a connection via the driveway of the rotunda to the Shell Hall of the wing on Potsdamer Straße at the same height. The lower hall height of approximately 3.7 meters and the thicker walls that had to absorb the load of the halls above prompted Bruno Schmitz to heavy vault forms. The vault, which seemed to grow directly from the floor, rested on huge mythical heads in front of the vault girders. Metzner also created similar heads for the crypt of the Völkerschlachtdenkmal in Leipzig. The heavy, massive construction was, however, only feigned; behind it was hidden a wire plaster construction. The vault and wall surfaces were covered with incrustations executed by the company Johann Odorico with geometric ornaments of gray Danube pebbles pressed into the cement and darker slate pieces. This design tied in with the grotto architectures of the Renaissance and Baroque, but also reminded of Moorish surface decorations. Numerous incandescent lamps embedded in the vault between the patterns formed a kind of starry sky. The artistically designed marble mosaic floor was also supplied by the company Johann Odorico. The large arch windows that could be sunk into the floor could be opened in summer to the artistically designed courtyard.

==== Red hall ====
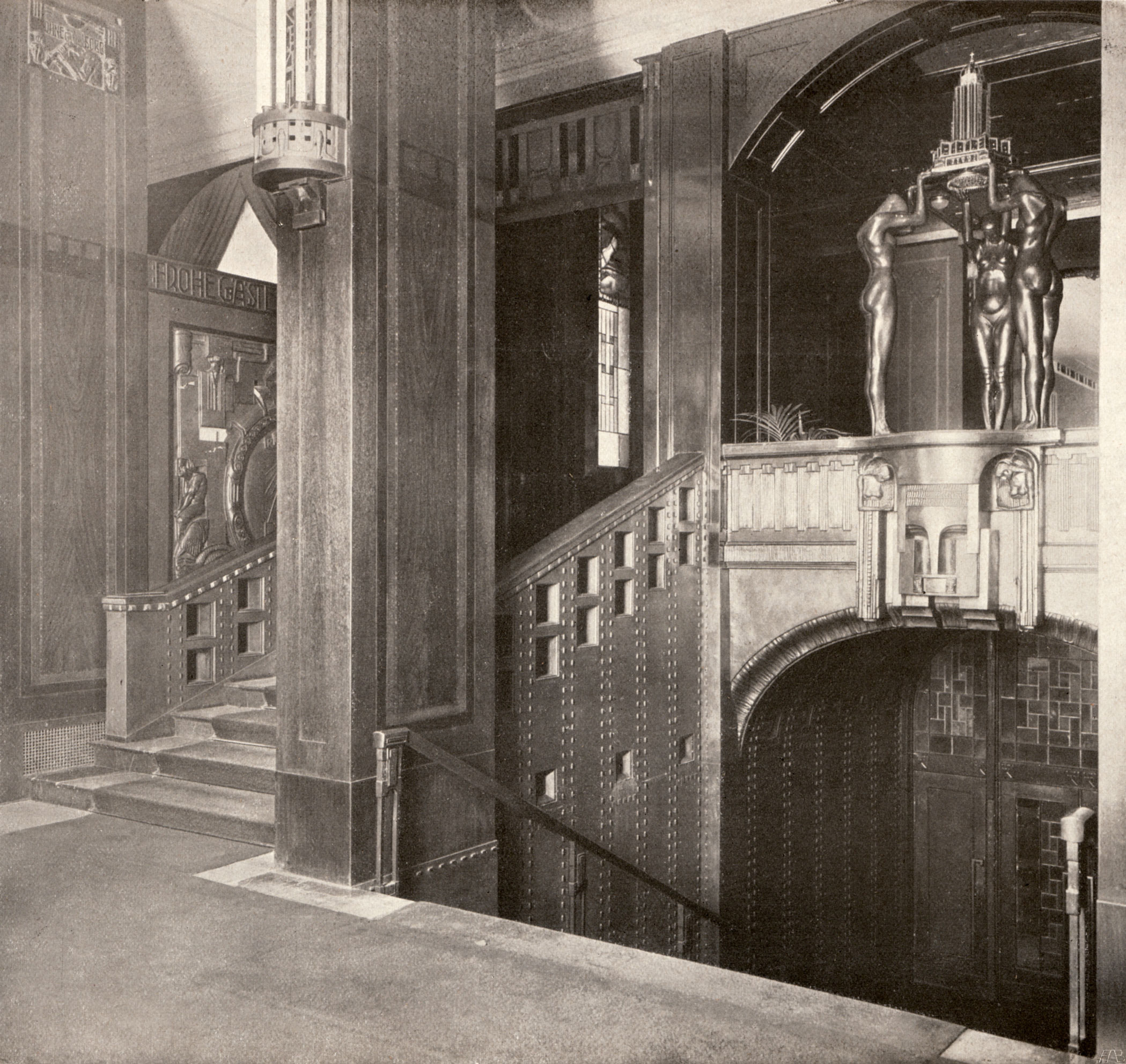
Stair ascent from the Pillar Hall to the Red Hall, right the Rheingold Fountain

The Red Hall on the ground floor, another elaborately designed transition room, lay 1.85 meters above the street level of Bellevuestraße. The approximately four meter high room received its name from the wall hangings of red silk or red velvet between the structuring wall pillars of reddish Padouk wood. A golden or silver ceiling with fairy tale motifs spanned the room. Subdued light received the room through two stained glass windows designed by the art painter August Unger, executed by the Atelier für Glasmalerei August Wichmann in Berlin. Fitting the originally planned use as a concert hall, they showed allegories of the musical tempos:Adagio and Andante as well as Allegro and Furioso.

A double-flight staircase led to the lower-lying Pillar Hall in the main building, into which it protruded definingly in the middle of the long side. On the landing of the staircase and visible from both sides rose as "showpiece of the complex", as "main symbol of the house", the Rheingold Fountain. The sculptor Franz Metzner modeled the three Rheinmaidens standing on the rim of a green marble bowl, carrying the Nibelung hoard in their raised hands. Like other works by Metzner, his naiads moved far from common academic ideals of beauty after the turn of the century. The critic Maximilian Rapsilber attested the "cold-hearted, harsh, angular naiads" a "truly deterrent majesty, so that no mortal would harbor desire for them". The casting of the bronze statues was done by the Gießerei G. Knodt in Frankfurt am Main.

The treasure could be electrically illuminated from inside and, in interplay with the water jet rising from the marble bowl, provided effects "as if liquid gold were performing a flame play".

==== Onyx hall ====
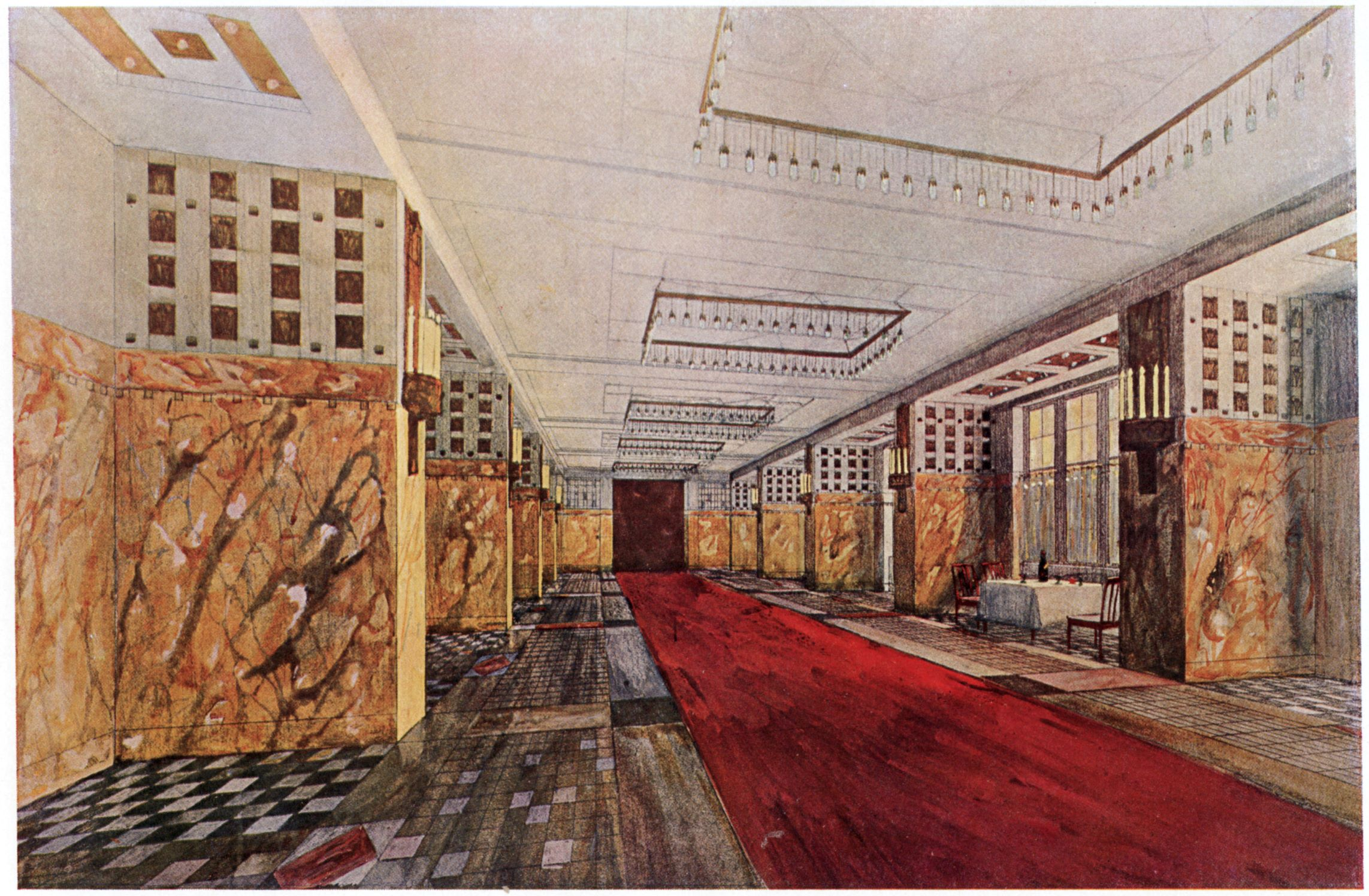
Design by Bruno Schmitz

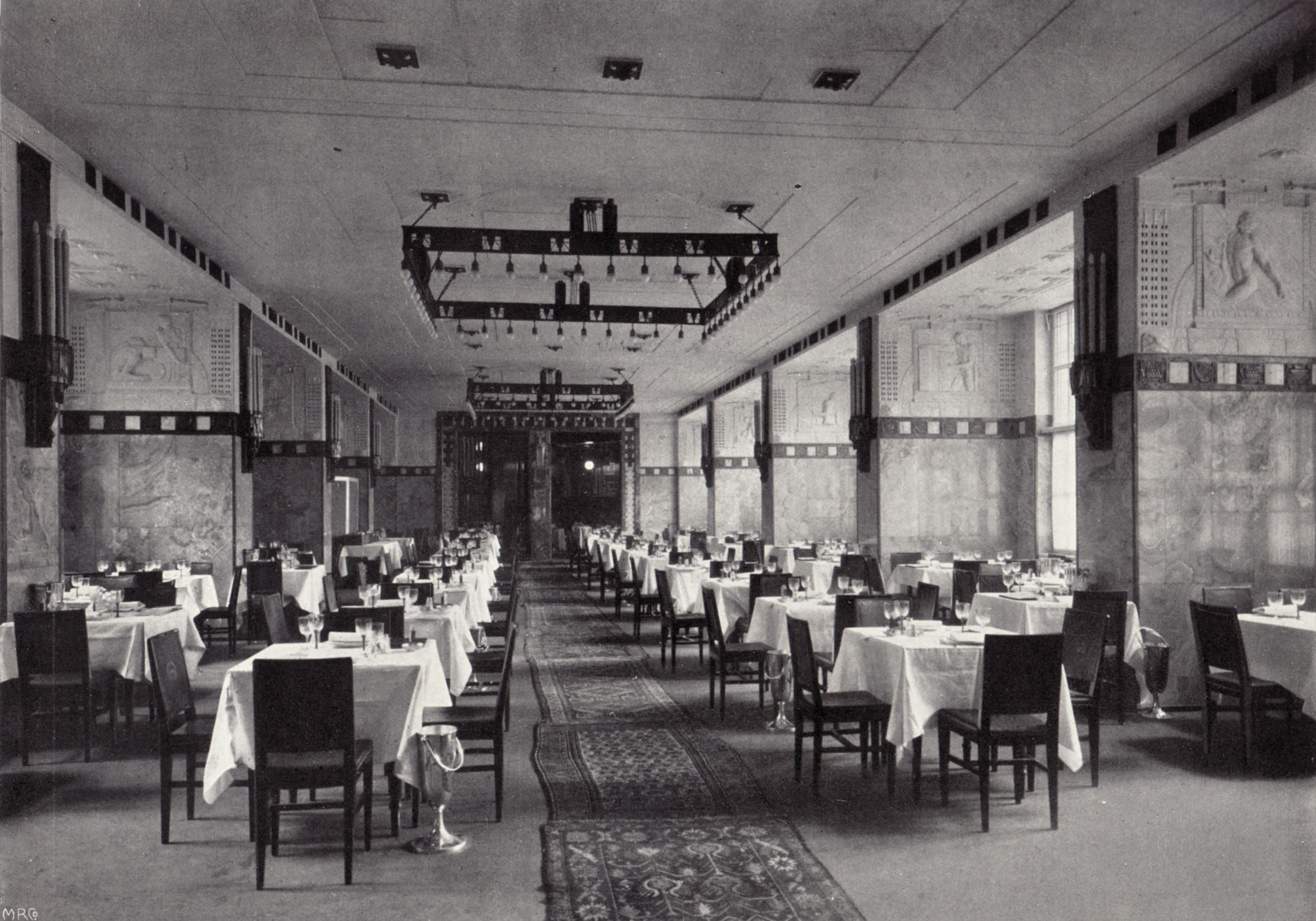
View of the onyx hall 1907

The Onyx Hall received its name from the onyx marble wall slabs that covered the walls and pillars. The 230 square meter rectangular room was four meters high, and the tongue walls designed as supports for the "Banquet Hall" above formed five niches each on the long sides. While on the western side all niches accommodated large, narrow-muntined windows, on the eastern side three niches had passages to an ancillary room. In this, the dishes from the kitchen in the attic reached the restaurant in twelve dumbwaiters and one freight elevator. The photos from the opening year show about 50 tables, each set for four persons.

The large light greenish-yellow onyx slabs from the Pyrenees contrasted effectively with their dark bronze frames. A bronze frieze – alternating punched squares in which the stone was visible, and bronze squares filled with simple patterns – separated this area from the upper wall zone. The long sides of the support pillars were covered with stucco reliefs by the sculptor Hermann Feuerhahn on the theme "Poetry of the Seasons" with Spring, Summer, Autumn and Winter as well as representations of the four elements Fire, Water, Air and Earth and the emblem of the Weinhaus Rheingold. On the end wall, lighting fixtures made of bronze together with two square silver chandeliers hanging from the ceiling from the Lorraine crystal manufactory Baccarat provided atmospheric lighting. The upper part of the walls and the ceiling were kept in a light yellowish stone tone.

After the rather dark, partly windowless and therefore only artificially lit rooms that visitors had passed through up to the "Onyx Hall", the room appeared light and cheerful due to the light materials and good lighting through the large windows and numerous lamps. The magazine Der Profanbau spoke of "light-glistening glory" and "champagne mood".

==== Banquet hall ====
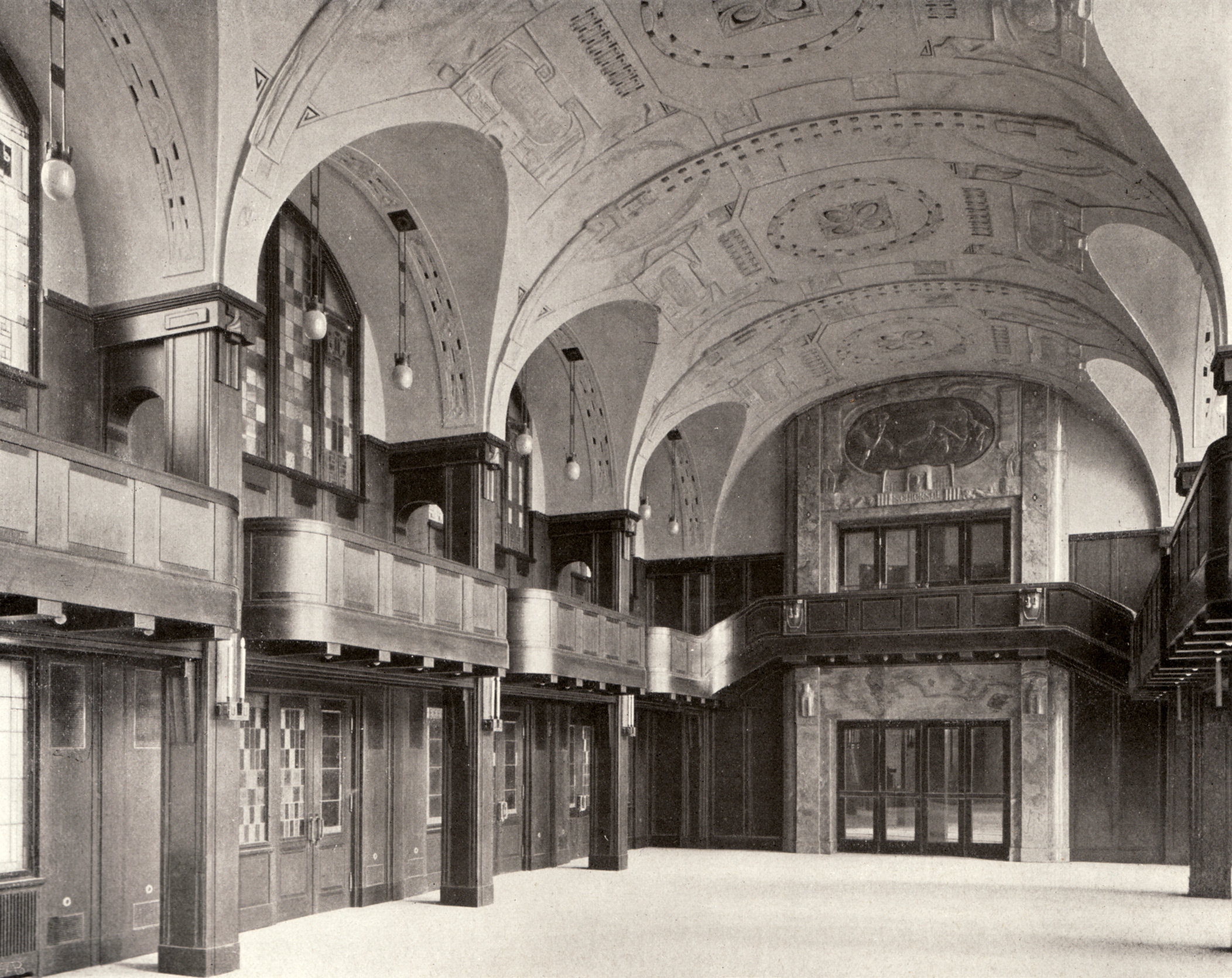
Banquet hall in view direction to the rotunda

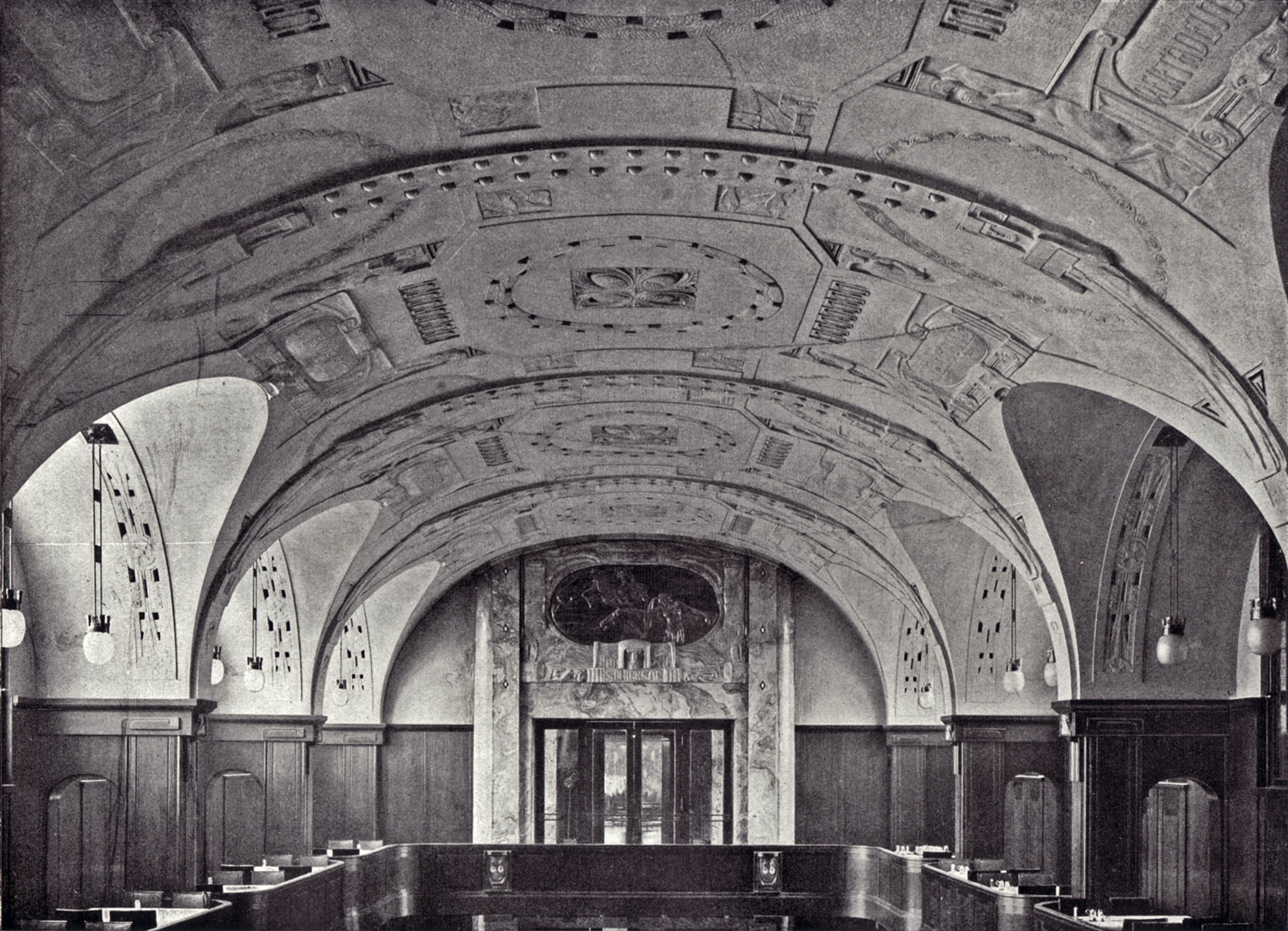
Banquet hall in view direction to the hall building

The largest hall in the intermediate tract was the Banquet Hall on the cloakroom floor, 6.25 meters above the level of Bellevuestraße. It was connected to the Pillar Hall of the main building via an ante-room, in which one staircase each left and right of the passage led to the galleries of the "Banquet Hall". At the other end of the hall, visitors reached the rotunda.

Longitudinally, a ceiling in the form of a barrel vault vaulted the room extending through two stories. Laterally, the lunettes over the high round arch windows cut into the main vault, whose apex lay 9.2 meters above the floor. Rather flat stucco work in forms reminiscent of Baroque covered the gray-white plaster ceiling.

Up to the vault approach, almost black water oak wood in simple, plain forms covered the walls. For the balconies of the galleries with their simple, compact balustrades spanning between the pillars, Bruno Schmitz also chose the same wood. The upper wall surfaces were kept in a light yellowish stone tone.

The entrance areas on the narrow walls framed portal-like built-ins of gray, vividly flamed Swiss Cipollino, "whose quarries were only reopened two years ago". Above the passage on the gallery toward the rotunda was embedded Hermann Feuerhahn's bronze relief Hagen with the Rheinmaidens. The passage toward the main building was adorned with the Brünnhilde's Fire Magic. Both reliefs were manufactured by the company G. Knodt in Frankfurt.

The room received its light during the day through the numerous windows, which were composed of rectangular glass pieces of different colors, partly also with figurative representations. In darkness, two lights per lunette and wall sconces on the pillars illuminated the hall.

==== Rotunda ====
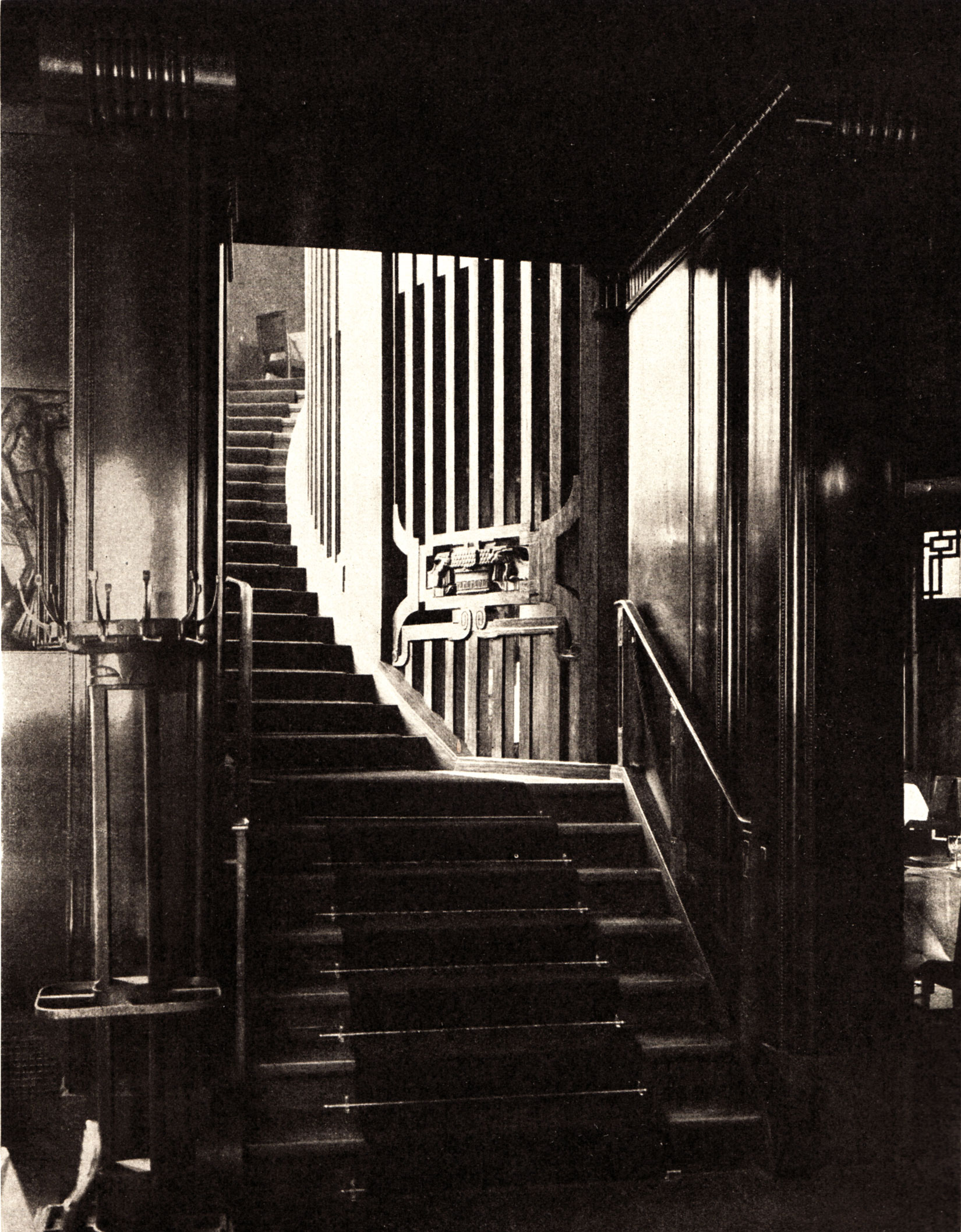
Stair in the lower rotunda, view from the Mahogany Hall

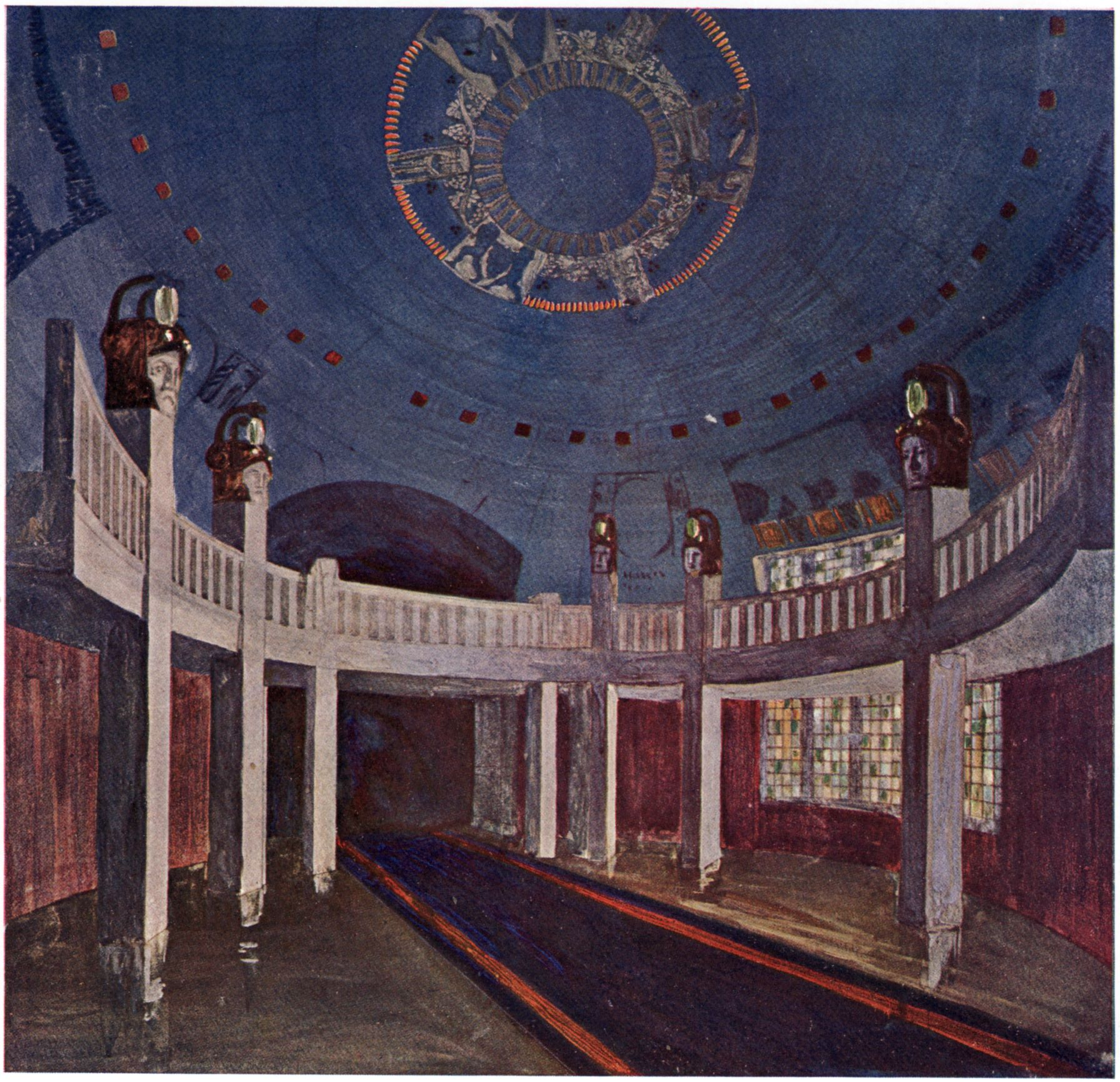
Design for the Blue Dome Hall

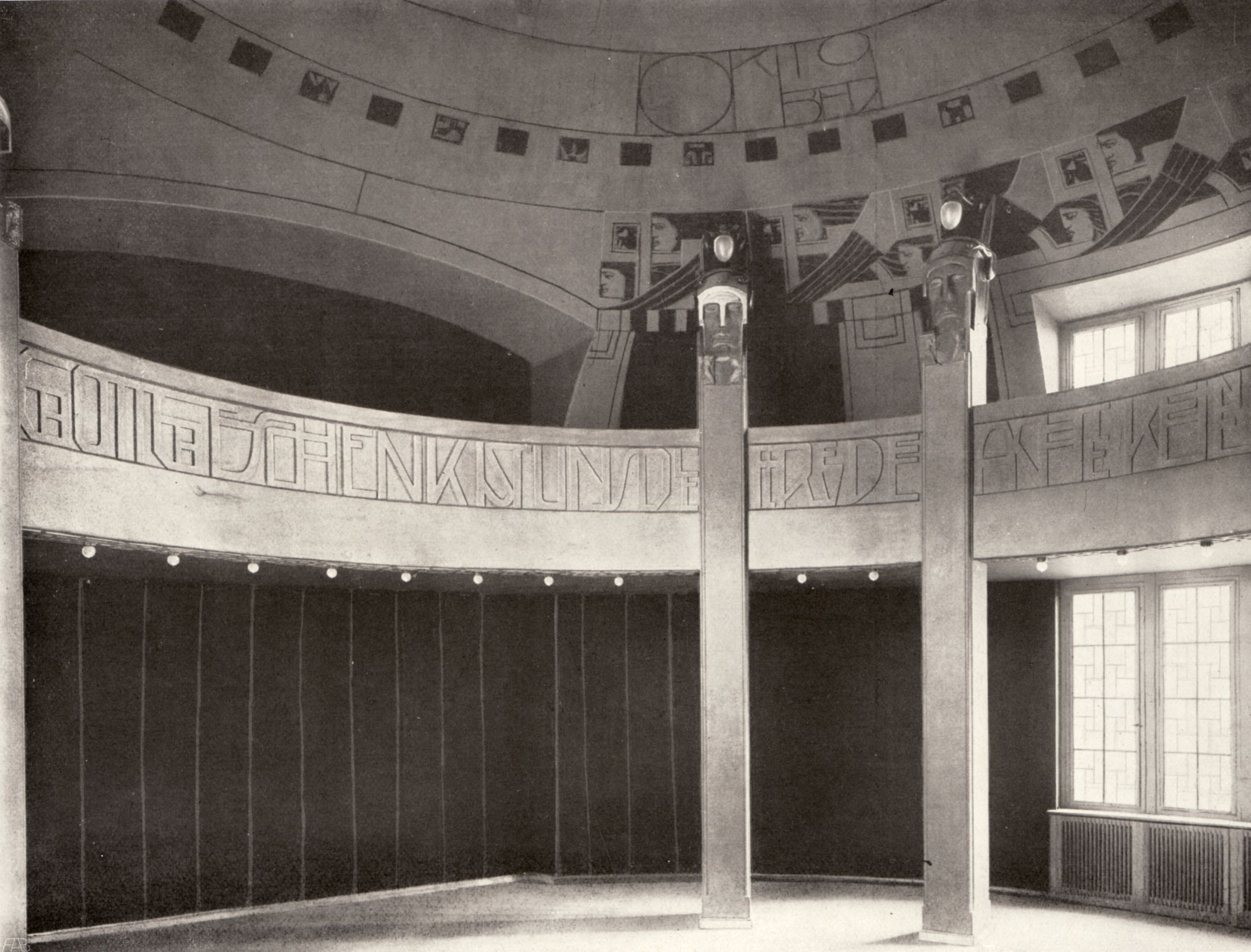
View of the Blue Dome Hall

The rotunda, a multi-story cylindrical building body with a radius of 6.15 meters, connected as a joint at the intermediate tract with the tract on Potsdamer Straße and mediated through its round ground plan between the wings meeting at an acute angle.

At the level of the kitchen floor, already 1.75 meters below the level of Potsdamer Straße, a driveway crossed the rotunda. It led from the service courtyard on Potsdamer Straße into the courtyard inside the property, whose fire wall toward the Grand Hôtel Esplanade was artistically designed. As a driveway, however, the 3.2 meter high room served only in exceptional cases. Mainly it connected the Shell Hall in the tract on Potsdamer Straße with the Wotan's Hall in the intermediate building. The level difference to these adjoining halls was compensated by three stairsteps each. An exit also led to a staircase that accessed all floors of the intermediate building.

The lower rotunda on the ground floor was also designed as a transition room. On one hand, the 4.0 meter high room connected the Onyx Hall in the intermediate building with the Mahogany Hall in the wing on Potsdamer Straße. On the other hand, two curved stairs led along the exterior walls led to the cloakroom floor. The stairs began in the "Mahogany Hall" and were visible in the rotunda only behind a decoratively treated latticework of almost black water oak. The stair runs also concealed the two windows, so that the lower rotunda received only subdued light through the stairs with their latticework. The Zentralblatt der Bauverwaltung reported of "peculiar geometric painting of the plaster surfaces, which reminds of fabric covering" and the red-black ceiling also fitted the room defined by the strong contrast of colors.

On the cloakroom floor, where the stair runs ended, the rotunda accommodated a restaurant. In reference to the design of the adjoining "Ebony Hall" in the tract on Potsdamer Straße, the 3.6 meter high room received walls of ebony. The silver-gray ceiling was covered with a pattern of lightly colored comb plaster. Toward Bellevuestraße adjoined the "Banquet Hall". Two windows illuminated the room that appeared almost "serious, monumental".

Visitors reached the Blue Rotunda on the hall floor either from the gallery of the Banquet Hall or via the staircase adjoining the rotunda. Since no further halls but only a kitchen were located in the tract on Potsdamer Straße, the room had no passage function to fulfill. Bruno Schmitz designed a "room intended for special small festivities".

Running pillar settings structured the two-story, 7.6 meter high room, which was covered by a blue-painted flat dome with a large gold rosette. The eight pillars of white marble ended in huge human heads, crowned by electric lighting fixtures. They carried a gallery at a height of approximately three meters. Its balustrade was adorned with a saying by the writer Emil Jacobsen:

Joy is a gift from God to us,
Let no one deem it small!
To protect and defy us in sorrow –
Joy is a serious thing!

Verses and sayings by Jacobsen also adorned the walls in the other rooms, such as the "Pillar Hall" in the hall building, in decorative scripts. Dome as well as wall surfaces and balustrade were designed by the painter August Unger. The room "in subdued blue-green lighting" reminded the Zeitschrift für Bauwesen of a "prehistoric idol temple", while for the magazine Der Profanbau it rather had "the mysterious demeanor of an Isis temple".

=== Ancillary and service rooms ===
The expensive property required maximum utilization, as far as the building police regulations allowed. The area intended for the restaurant rooms corresponded approximately to the area of the ancillary and service rooms together. The ancillary and service rooms were mostly in the basement and attic floors less attractive for customer rooms. To cover this huge space requirement, the Weinhaus Rheingold had as one of the first large buildings in the Berlin inner city two fully usable basement floors.

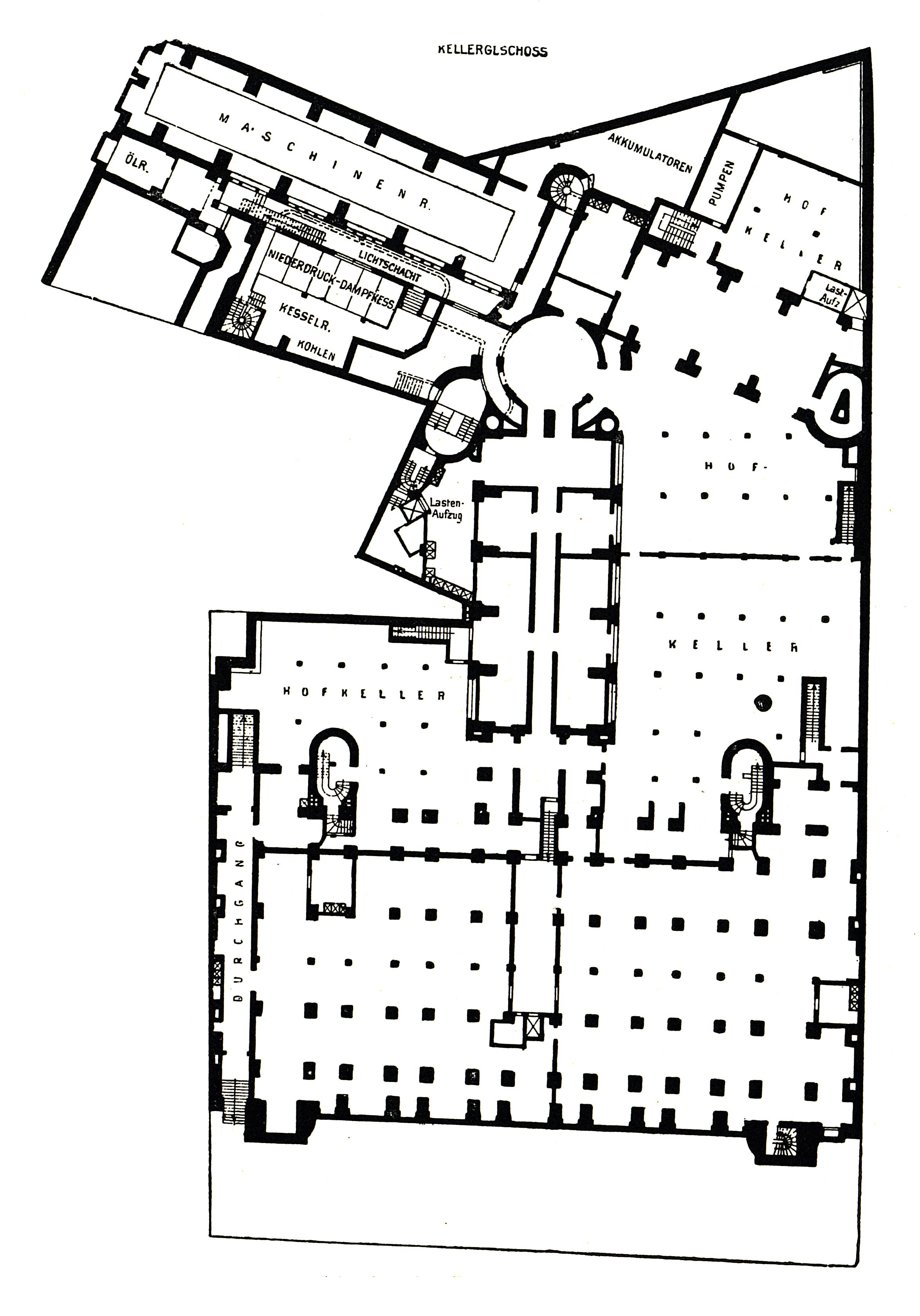
Basement floor plan

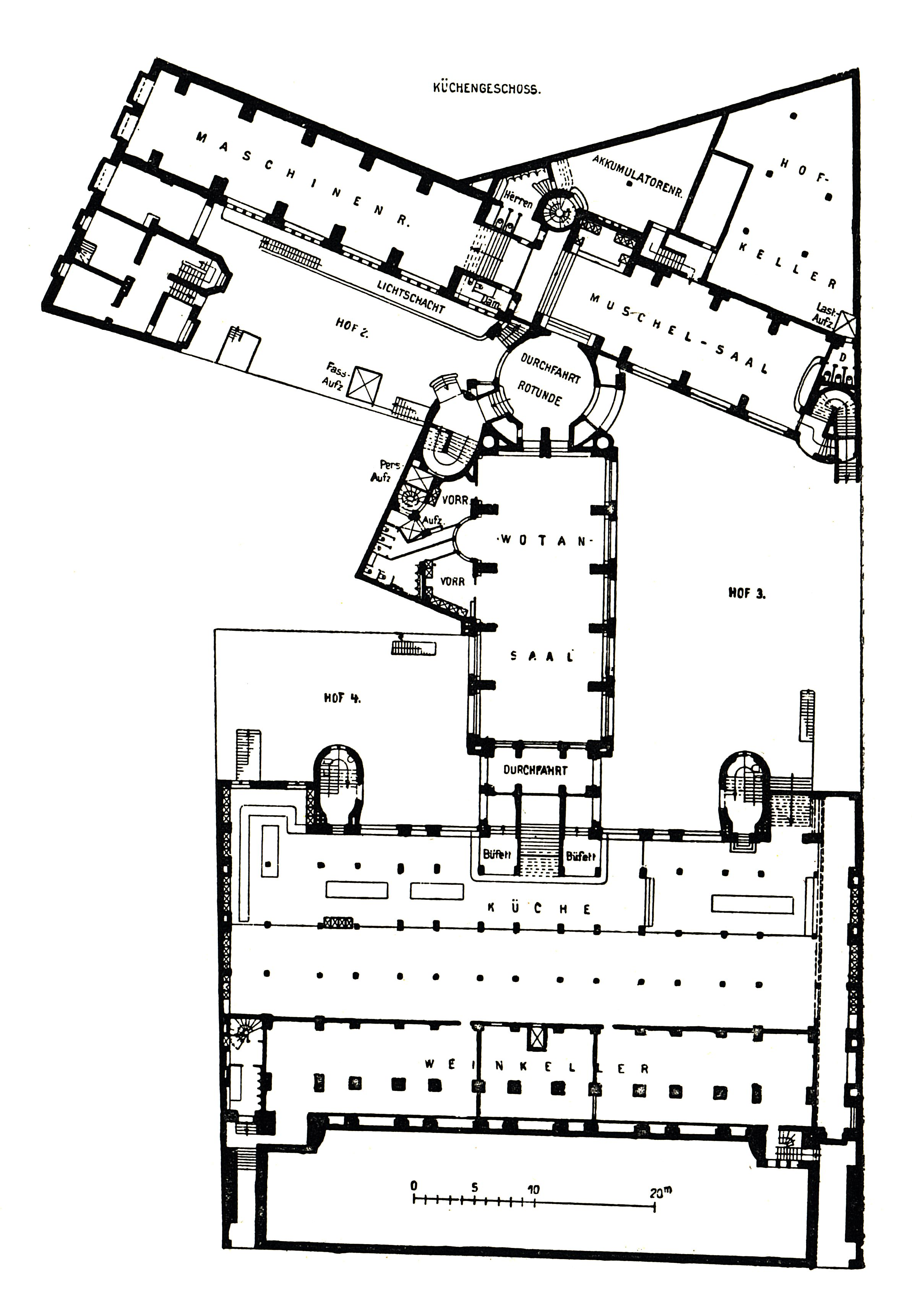
Kitchen floor plan

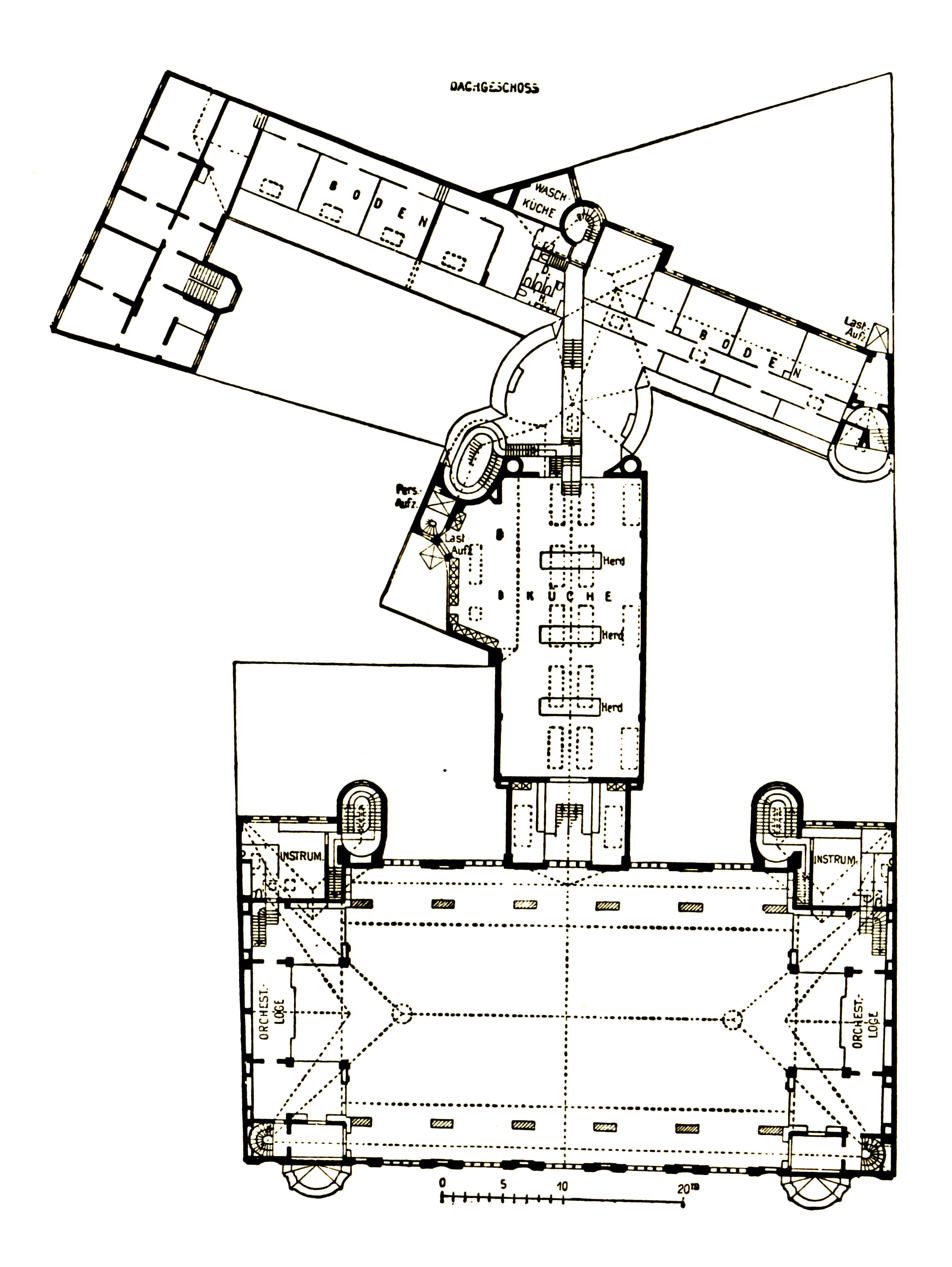
Attic floor plan

The sole of the lower basement lay 5.50 meters below street level, the groundwater level at 3.15 meters, so the basement stood 2.35 meters in the groundwater. Downward, a 90 centimeter thick, partly iron-reinforced concrete slab with a 20 millimeter thick insulation layer of three layers of glued bitumen paper with coating of hot-applied tar mass sealed. The similar bitumen paper insulation raised on the side walls up to 30 centimeters above the groundwater level sealed against laterally penetrating groundwater.

The basement rooms extended to the property boundaries. The lower basement accommodated besides the cold storage rooms mainly ancillary rooms with technical facilities such as the boiler room of the heating, the pump room or the oil room for the generators. The machine room toward Potsdamer Straße, whose 28 meter long and 4.50 meter wide machine foundation lay another 1.4 meters deeper than the basement floor sole, extended into the second basement, designated in the plans as kitchen floor. The three courtyards lowered relative to street level cut into the kitchen floor. The area under the wing on Bellevuestraße was divided by the main kitchen of the Weinhaus and the wine cellar, which held seven million bottles of wine.

==== Kitchens ====
The Weinhaus Rheingold had three kitchen facilities, one for each building section. The kitchen for the structure on Bellevuestraße was located in the kitchen floor below the restaurants it served. The house's largest kitchen facility, well-equipped with eleven cooking machines, six large steam cookers, numerous grills and warming cabinets, extended over about two-thirds of the floor area below the hall building. It also accommodated special facilities, such as the pastry shop and the copper and silver washing rooms. 25 food elevators, some heated with electric heating coils to prevent the food from cooling, transported the meals to the various restaurants in the Bellevuestraße tract, such as the "Kaisersaal". The kitchens of the Weinhaus Rheingold employed 137 staff in the opening year, 70 of whom worked in the main kitchen. The kitchens serving the halls in the connecting building and in the side wing on Potsdamer Straße were located above the associated restaurants in the attic and hall floors, connected to them by food elevators. Dimensioned smaller in accordance with the smaller halls and fewer guests, they were, like the main kitchen, hygienically equipped with white-tiled walls, pillars and ceilings, while a smooth, light tile covering covered the floor.

==== Cold storage rooms ====
The seven main cold storage rooms for storing perishable foodstuffs such as meat, fish, poultry, butter, cheese and vegetables together covered an area of approximately 160 m^{2} in the basement. The respective daily requirements of the three kitchens were stored in ten further cold storage rooms of 15 to 20 square meters each in the kitchens themselves. Impregnated cork panels isolated the cold storage rooms from the surroundings. Their walls, ceilings and floors were lined with white tiles. The cold was produced by a compression refrigeration machine delivered by August Borsig in Tegel using sulfur dioxide as the refrigerant. A pipe system with cork insulation distributed the brine cooled to −12 °C from the basement to the various cold storage rooms, whose temperature was set between +2 and +6 °C depending on the type of food. The refrigeration machine additionally produced two tons of ice daily for the needs in the various restaurants of the Weinhaus.

==== Steam laundry ====
In a separate steam laundry, all the laundry generated in the house was washed and ironed. The used table linen reached the laundry collection point in the basement via drop shafts in the dining halls. From there it reached the washhouse and the associated laundry storage on the third floor of the side wing on Potsdamer Straße at the level of the gallery floor. The technical equipment for the white-tiled rooms was supplied by the company H. Timm in Berlin, including four large washing machines, three centrifuges and two cylinder mangles. The steam required for operation was supplied by the low-pressure steam boilers in the boiler room in the basement.

== Technical facilities ==
The sheer size of the Weinhaus already placed special demands on the technical systems. Added to this was the basement located deep in the groundwater and the client's desire to operate the house as independently as possible from external influences. For economic reasons, operating costs were to be kept as low as possible – preliminary calculations estimated, for example, the annual costs for electric lighting alone at about 55,000 marks. Therefore, the Weinhaus Rheingold had its own wells and generated electricity itself, with the waste heat from the generators simultaneously used for hot water preparation.

=== Electrical systems ===
The electric current for the 5212 tantalum lamps, 544 carbon filament candle lamps and the 51 arc lamps as well as for operating the numerous pumps, fans, passenger and goods elevators and ice machines was produced by three direct current shunt-wound dynamos each with 204 kilowatts of power, each directly coupled to a diesel engine. The lighting system and generators were manufactured by Siemens-Schuckert-Werke GmbH in Berlin. The Maschinenfabrik Augsburg supplied the three four-cylinder diesel engines of 300 HP each, running at 175 revolutions per minute. The machines were housed in the machine basement under the tract on Potsdamer Straße. The eight-meter-wide, 35-meter-long and five-meter-high room was 5.5 meters below street level but received direct daylight through a two-meter-wide light shaft on the long side. The 13 cubic meter fuel tank was located directly next to the machine basement under the courtyard entrance. The electrical systems also included the accumulator battery consisting of 125 elements, housed in two superimposed basement rooms of 60 square meters each. Switched in parallel with the machines during operation, they compensated for voltage fluctuations in the generators and the network and were able to supply the house with power for nearly three hours after the machines failed. This system was supplied by Akkumulatoren-Aktien-Gesellschaft in Hagen. The electrical lines, operating at 220 volts, were visibly run above the plaster on rollers in ancillary rooms such as kitchens, basements or attics.

=== Cold and hot water systems ===
Two deep wells on the property on Potsdamer Straße drew groundwater from 48 meters depth. An electrically operated high-pressure centrifugal pump with a delivery rate of 1200 liters per minute pumped the water, which was heavily iron-containing as in the entire Berlin area, through a de-ironing system in the attic to the two cold water tanks above, each with a capacity of eight cubic meters. From there, distribution took place throughout the house. A second pump served as a reserve and a float contact device interrupted the pump's delivery when both tanks were full. If the self-extracted amount did not cover demand, water from the municipal network supplemented the need.

For generating hot water, as an early example of combined heat and power, the cooling water of the large diesel engine system was used. The water heated to about 80 °C and flowed into two galvanized hot water reservoirs totaling 60 cubic meters in the basement. From there, a high-pressure centrifugal pump pumped the warm water to the hot water tanks in the attic. The cooling water did not cover the entire demand – the rest of the hot water was supplied by a conventional heating boiler in the boiler room under the courtyard on Potsdamer Straße.

=== Drainage ===
The deep location of part of the basement below the level of the municipal sewer required special precautions. On the one hand, discharge via natural gradient was not possible; on the other hand, the canal on Bellevuestraße, which quickly became overloaded during rainy weather, threatened to flood the large kitchen in the underground kitchen floor with backwater.

When the automatic backwater flaps closed due to overload of the municipal sewer on Bellevuestraße, the wastewater generated in the house flowed as overflow via emergency lines higher than the main sewer lines into a street gutter. This simultaneously collected water from the basement areas lower than the sewer, such as overflow water from the hot water tanks or rainwater entering via the basement stairs. A centrifugal pump conveyed the water from the gutter into the less overloaded canal on Potsdamer Straße. The systems were supplied by Allgemeine Städte-Reinigungsgesellschaft mbH in Berlin.

=== Heating and ventilation ===
The boiler room of the low-pressure steam heating was located under the farmyard on Potsdamer Straße. The coal-fired system consisting of six steam boilers was divided into two groups, the larger with four boilers serving exclusively for generating steam for heating. The smaller group with two heating boilers produced the steam for the kitchens Gill and laundry but could be switched to heating if needed.

The heating system was dimensioned to produce only about 80 percent of the heat required for an indoor temperature of 20 °C. The ventilation supplemented the remaining heat demand. Through this coupling of heating with ventilation, the ventilation system also had to be kept in permanent operation. This in turn ensured sufficient air exchange in the rooms of the Weinhaus Rheingold.

The restaurant rooms had pressure ventilation, where fresh and, if necessary, pre-warmed air was forced into the room – 20 cubic meters per guest and hour. In the kitchens and sanitary facilities, where the air was renewed five times per hour, suction ventilation prevented the spread of bad odors. Three fans in the basement under the farmyard on Potsdamer Straße drew in fresh outside air. A 40 square meter coke filter built into the courtyard floor freed the fresh air from dust and vermin. In three heating chambers, one per fan and with different temperatures, the air could be warmed via finned radiators. By mixing warm air of different temperatures, and if necessary with cold air, the air could be set to the desired temperature before flowing through the ventilation ducts into the rooms. Schmitz skillfully integrated the openings of the ventilation ducts into the architecture of the individual rooms. The entire heating and ventilation system, supplied by the company David Grove in Berlin, could be centrally controlled from the control center in the basement.

== Criticism ==
Contemporary German architectural press reported largely positively, sometimes almost enthusiastically, about the new building. The Deutsche Bauzeitung, for example, saw the Weinhaus Rheingold as "one of the most significant architectural creations of the present, a work of the greatest scope and victorious design power". The Berliner Architekturwelt ranked the building alongside Alfred Messel's nearby Wertheim department store at Leipziger Platz as "the best buildings of our time". The journal Der Profanbau also saw the Weinhaus Rheingold as the "full-weight counterpart" to Messel's department store, which would achieve for the term "Aschinger" what the Messel building did for "the term Wertheim and generally for the ennoblement of the department store". While the Deutschen Bauzeitung knew "no recent foreign creation that comes close to the Rheingold", conversely the building received no appreciation in contemporary foreign architectural press. The Vossische Zeitung honored the new building in 1907 as a "splendid New Year's gift that the Aschinger Company presents to the imperial capital", the Weinhaus Rheingold standing "unique and incomparable on the whole earth."

Recognition also went to the cultural commitment of the Aschinger joint stock company – partly with digs at the "beer sources" from which "suddenly fabulous streams of gold for the highest art" flowed – and their choice of Bruno Schmitz as architect, who "would never have gone along with the tastelessness of a gold-mosaic-strutting, Romanizing-Byzantinizing imperial hall for the consumption of Munich beer and bockwurst, as we once had in Berlin."

Criticism, however, arose from the discord between the ambitious artistic design of the Weinhaus Rheingold and its rather profane use as a large restaurant. The French journalist Jules Huret visited the newly opened house in Berlin during his trip to Germany and asked in his 1909 travel report:

Where am I? In what Teutonic fortress, in what giant cloister? In what Buddhist crypt or what Valhalla? I am in a restaurant where the cuisine is bad and where I can eat at reduced prices.

—, in Jules Huret, fr, Wo bin ich? In welcher teutonischen Burg, in welchem riesigen Klosterkreuzgang? In welcher buddhistischen Krypta oder in welcher Walhalla? Ich bin in einem Restaurant, wo die Küche schlecht ist und wo ich zu verbilligten Preisen essen kann.

He praised the design efforts with the words:

Nevertheless, one cannot deny that there is an enormous effort here to escape the conventional and the insipid, an effort that I could not help admiring when I did not think that 4000 people come within these walls of legend and dream to fill their bellies.

— , in Jules Huret, fr, Gleichwohl, man kann nicht leugnen, dass es hier eine gewaltige Anstrengung gibt, vom Herkömmlichen und Faden wegzukommen. Eine Anstrengung, die zu bewundern ich mir nicht verwehren konnte, wenn ich nicht gerade daran dachte, dass 4000 Personen in diese Mauern der Legenden und Träume kommen, um sich den Bauch vollzuschlagen.

The art critic Max Osborn already mentioned in 1909 in volume 43 of the series Berühmte Kunststätten with the overall presentation of Berlin's art history the Weinhaus Rheingold, "whose solemn facade (with relief figures by Franz Metzner) and over-splendid, if distinguished by excellent treatment in genuine materials, interior fittings are not in harmony with the purpose of the house".

Some contemporaries were disturbed by Franz Metzner's non-naturalistic, ornamental treatment of the human body. The Deutsche Bauzeitung, for example, reported that "his artistic conception met with the strongest opposition from traditional taste". While the Zentralblatt der Bauverwaltung showed understanding for "a certain uneasy feeling" caused by the "violated bodies", the other specialist critics distanced themselves from it. Thus wrote Theodor Heuss, the later first President of Germany and at the time critic for the Neudeutschen Bauzeitung: "I am not bothered by the fact that the men formed in wood or other material on the pillars and wall paneling are headless and have received at best fragmentary and questionable replacement." He praised Schmitz's efforts to revive "plastic in architecture" in the external design of the building and in the large rooms of the Weinhaus Rheingold, especially the "Kaisersaal". For the smaller cabinets and halls, however, "the monumental plastic acts violently and as a burden" and the "too large scale of the plastic" oppresses the room.

The architectural historian Julius Posener also compared in 1977 in his publication Berlin auf dem Weg zu einer neuen Architektur 1889–1918 the Weinhaus Rheingold with Messel's Wertheim department store. He attested the Rheingold facade superior quality and greater modernity – "Only Messel's Leipziger street front was on the path that led further. The Rheingold front represents the most beautiful expression of an achieved state of art, thus standing rather at the end of a path."

== Lack of profitability of Aschinger's prestige object ==
The euphoria of the group after the opening on February 6, 1907, quickly gave way to concerns due to problems in operations and the lack of cost coverage of the Weinhaus Rheingold. As early as July 1907, Carl Aschinger therefore asked his brother August to re-enter the operational business, although as supervisory board of the Aschinger joint stock company he was only supposed to perform supervisory and representative functions. August Aschinger noted in a memo that the "financial side of the Rheingold [...] was economically simply impossible" and "would indeed have devoured the other businesses". "Making this house operational was the greatest task of my life." Problems were caused, for example, by the oversized expansion of the Weinhaus Rheingold. Thus, the food cooled on its way to the guests despite the electrically heated food elevators. If more than 3000 guests visited the establishment, the kitchens reached their capacity limits. Long waiting times as well as lukewarm or even cold food were not good advertising for the Aschinger group's showpiece and not a good basis for building a customer base. By installing additional kitchens and utility rooms still in 1907, probably coupled with improvements in service, August Aschinger succeeded in solving the operational problems.

The earnings situation remained poor, however, with revenues barely covering ongoing costs. With this poor earnings situation, the high investment costs for the property and building were also not amortized. The original calculation of the catering operation was already obsolete at the opening of the Weinhaus Rheingold as a result of the building authority-ordered change of use and the cost overrun of one million marks. There Aschinger had calculated "with slightly increased wine prices" "cheap and good food portions at base prices of M. 0.80 and M. 1.30" and 3800 seats. The weak return on sales of the Weinhaus Rheingold within the Aschinger group is exemplified by the figures from January 1911. The 30 "beer sources" achieved sales of 1.1 million marks with a profit of 160,000 marks and thus a return on sales of 14.6 percent. The Weinhaus Rheingold, on the other hand, achieved sales of 300,000 marks with a profit of 15,000 marks and thus only five percent return on sales, about one third. The group had invested better in the nearby Hotel Fürstenhof at Potsdamer Platz, where profitability reached 22.2 percent based on a profit of 30,000 marks on sales of 135,000 marks.

The obituary for Carl Aschinger in the Deutsche Gastwirthe-Zeitung of May 8, 1909 gives a picture of the continued lack of success of the Weinhaus Rheingold. Evenly high guest numbers remained absent and occupancy was only reasonably satisfactory on Sundays, so that most halls remained closed during the week. Kitchen and cellar were "not up to standard" and lagged behind the competition. The locale built with such high standards could neither permanently win the Berlin middle nor upper class as regular guests and became a tourist spot. Griebens Reiseführer Berlin und Umgebung recommended the Weinhaus Rheingold in 1909 as a "highly elegant wine and beer restaurant". Somewhat more critically, Baedekers Berlin und Umgebung ranked the locale in 1910 among the "not so pretentious" wine restaurants, but mentioned in the city tour at Potsdamer Platz "the splendidly equipped Weinhaus Rheingold, built by Bruno Schmitz, with sculptures by F. Metzner". As a tourist attraction with lacking profitability, the Weinhaus Rheingold remained an economic misstep for the otherwise so successful Aschinger group.

== Interwar period ==
In the economically difficult times after the First World War, the group considered selling the Weinhaus Rheingold in 1919. However, the sales plans already approved by the supervisory board, which were to bring in 15 million marks, fell through. The modern equipment of the Weinhaus Rheingold from the imperial era with its Art Nouveau touches was considered outdated after the end of the First World War. At the beginning of the 1920s, Griebens Reiseführer noted evening concert events, in addition, from 1922 dance and cabaret events were to increase the attractiveness of the locale. Success continued to elude, and in 1928 the group management resignedly stated that the Weinhaus Rheingold "does not nearly cover its costs, let alone speak of earnings." With the Great Depression, the situation worsened in 1930, as the cross-subsidization of the Weinhaus Rheingold by other Aschinger operations ceased due to collapsed earnings, and the group got into serious financial difficulties in 1931. The Weinhaus Rheingold remained completely closed in the years 1931/1932 and was no longer mentioned in Baedekers Berlin und Umgebung in 1933. From 1935, catering to the numerous tour groups traveling to Berlin with the "Strength Through Joy" organization and events of patriotic associations brought somewhat better occupancy. In World War II, the Weinhaus Rheingold served as troop accommodation, though operations had to be discontinued in the winter of 1940 due to coal shortage.

== Sale and destruction ==
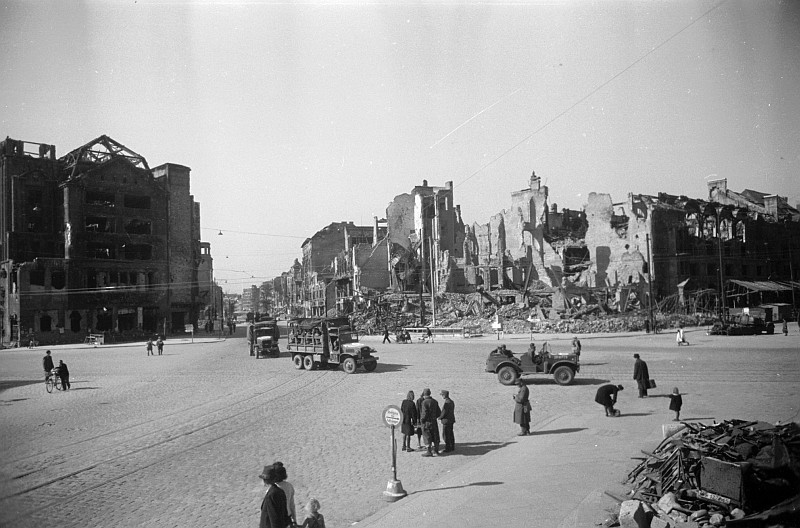
The ruin of the Weinhaus on the right edge of the picture in October 1945

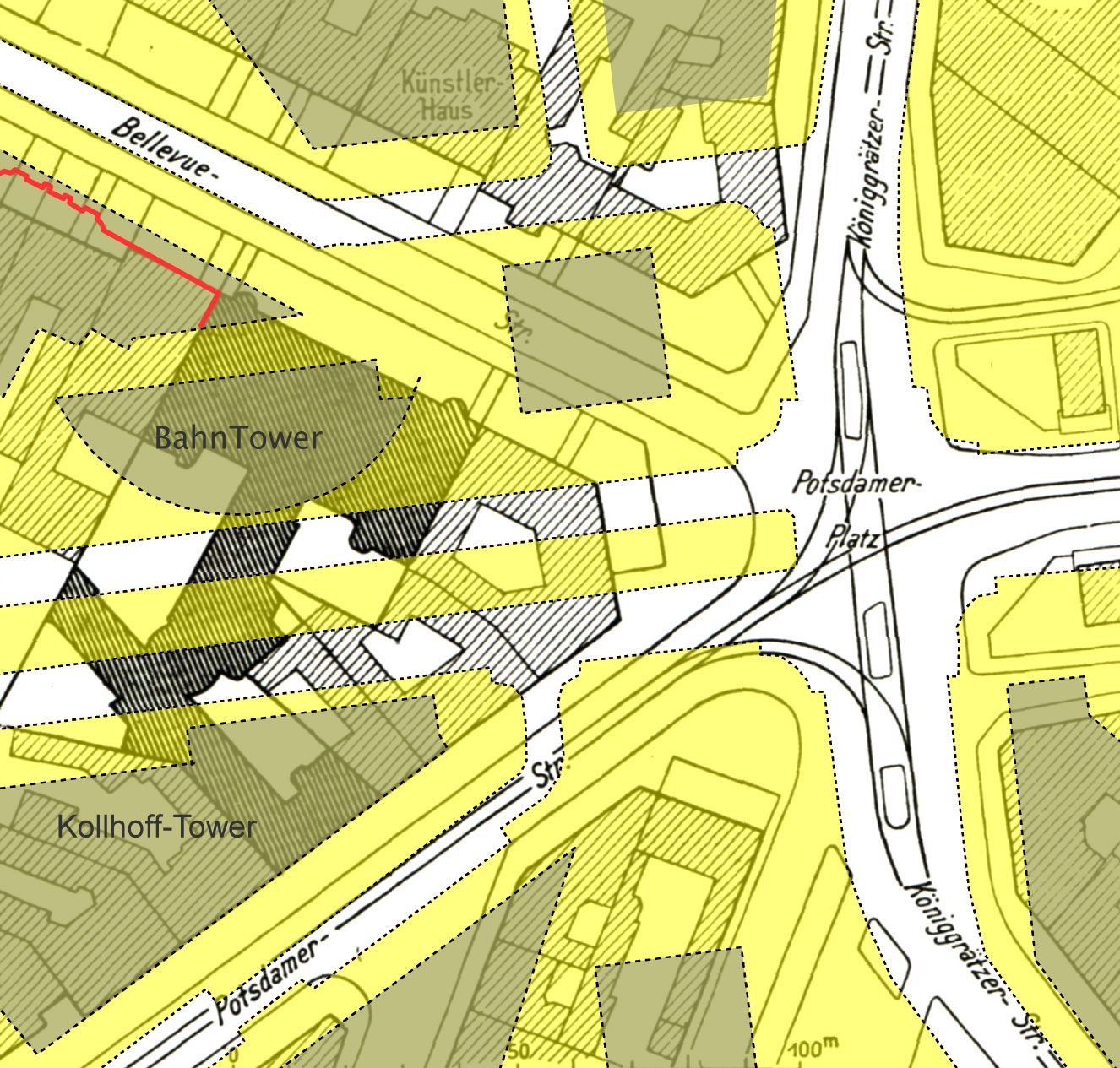
Historical site plan, overlaid with today's development, red marking the facade of the former Grand Hôtel Esplanade

In January 1943, a report in the Berliner Börsen-Zeitung about the sales intentions of the Aschinger company for the Weinhaus Rheingold aroused the interest of several Reich ministries. The property was near the new, prestigious north–south axis in Albert Speer's plans for the Welthauptstadt Germania. In the files of the former Aschinger group, kept in the Landesarchiv Berlin, there is a preliminary contract with the Finance Ministry setting the sale price at six million Reichsmarks. The contract was ultimately awarded in 1943 to the Deutsche Reichspost. In a bombing raid the same year, the building suffered severe damage, and the inventory stored at the sale, worth 250,000 Reichsmarks, burned in an attack in spring 1944.

The 1945 building damage map marked the building as "damaged but rebuildable", yet the ruins of the Weinhaus Rheingold were quickly cleared in the first postwar years. Photographs show the cleared site already at the beginning of the 1950s. After the construction of the Berlin Wall in 1961, the Linkstraße extended as a bypass around the no longer accessible Potsdamer Platz to Bellevuestraße ran over the building rubble. The Potsdamer Straße, rerouted in 1966 for the new building of the West Berlin State Library, also ran over the site of the former Weinhaus Rheingold.

With the redevelopment of Potsdamer Platz after German reunification, the situation changed again. While the extension of Linkstraße was reversed, the Potsdamer Straße extended to Potsdamer Platz divides the property. Approximately at the site of the hall building on Bellevuestraße today stands the BahnTower, while the opposite Kollhoff-Tower occupies, among other things, the area of the former front building on Potsdamer Straße.

== Bibliography ==
- Alexander Koch: Professor Bruno Schmitz’ Haus Rheingold Berlin. Verlagsanstalt Alexander Koch, Darmstadt, no year [1907] (Kochs Monographien XIII).
- Brüstlein: Das Weinhaus Rheingold in Berlin. In: Zentralblatt der Bauverwaltung. Nr. 29, 1907, S. 198–202 (zlb.de – 1. Teil). (2. Teil). In: Zentralblatt der Bauverwaltung. Nr. 31, 1907, S. 210–213 (zlb.de).
- Karl-Heinz Glaser: Aschingers „Bierquellen“ erobern Berlin. Aus dem Weinort Oberderdingen in die aufstrebende Hauptstadt. Verlag Regionalkultur, Heidelberg 2004, ISBN 3-89735-291-5, pp. 83–99.
- Hermann Hinderer: Weinhaus Rheingold. In: Der Baumeister, 1907, 5th year, issue 7, pp. 73–84, pp. 87–91.
- Karl-Heinz Hüter: Architektur in Berlin. Kohlhammer, Stuttgart 1988, ISBN 3-17-009732-6, pp. 46–48.
- Theodor Heuss: Rheingold von Bruno Schmitz. In: Neudeutsche Bauzeitung, 1907, vol. 3, pp. 145–148.
- Leo Nachtlicht: Weinhaus Rheingold in Berlin. In: Berliner Architekturwelt. Nr. 1, April 1907, pp. 5–40 (zlb.de).
- Julius Posener: Berlin auf dem Wege zu einer neuen Architektur: das Zeitalter Wilhelms II. Prestel, München 1979, ISBN 3-7913-0419-4, pp. 85, 100–105.
- Maximilian Rapsilber: Das Weinhaus Rheingold. In: Der Profanbau, 1907, vol. 3, pp. 94–100, 105–108, 117–119, 138–143.
- Hans Schliepmann: Bruno Schmitz. Ernst Wasmuth, Berlin 1913, p. VIII (= XIII. Sonderheft der Berliner Architekturwelt).
- Hans Schliepmann: „Haus Rheingold“ in Berlin. Eine Meisterschöpfung von Bruno Schmitz. In: Deutsche Kunst und Dekoration. Illustrierte Monatshefte für moderne Malerei, Plastik, Architektur, Wohnungskunst und künstlerische Frauenarbeiten, 1907, pp. 1–60.
- Der Neubau des Weinhauses „Rheingold“ der Aktien-Gesellschaft Aschinger in der Bellevue- und der Potsdamer Straße zu Berlin. In: Deutsche Bauzeitung, 1907, vol. 41, pp. 85–89, 111–112, 121–125, 257–259, 261–265, 269–273.
- Die Metallarbeiten im Weinrestaurant Rheingold, Bellevue und Potsdamer Straße in Berlin. In: Bautechnische Zeitschrift, 1908, vol. 23, pp. 107, 196–200.
