= Franz Metzner =

German sculptor

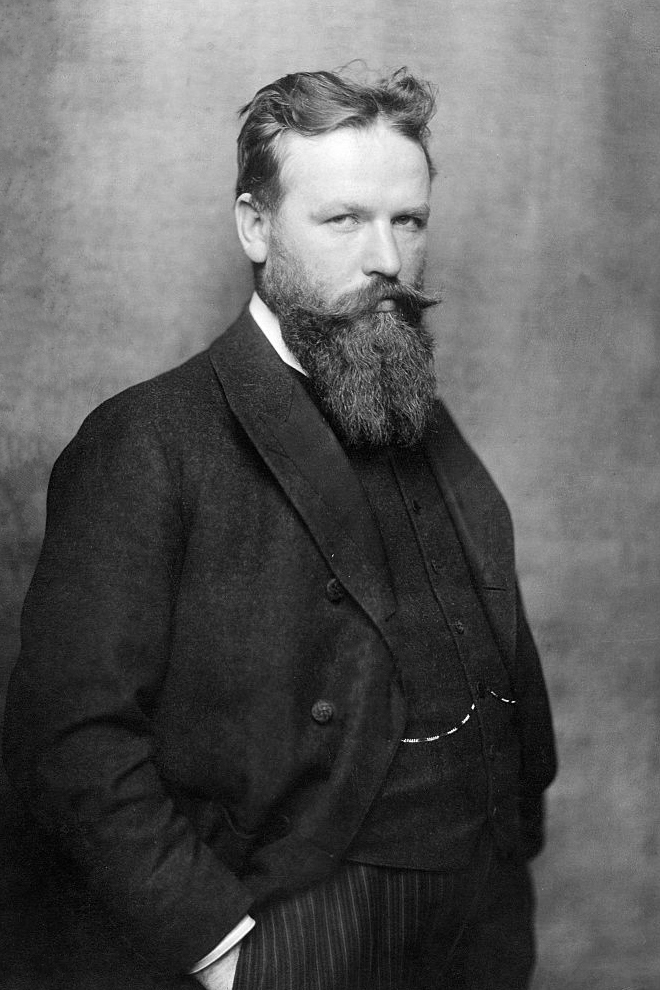
Franz Metzner by Nicola Perscheid

Franz Metzner (18 November 1870, Wscherau, near Plzeň – 24 March 1919, Berlin) was an influential German sculptor, particularly his sculptural figures integrated into the architecture of Central European public buildings in the Art Nouveau / Jugendstil / Vienna Secession period. His style is difficult to classify.

== Biography ==
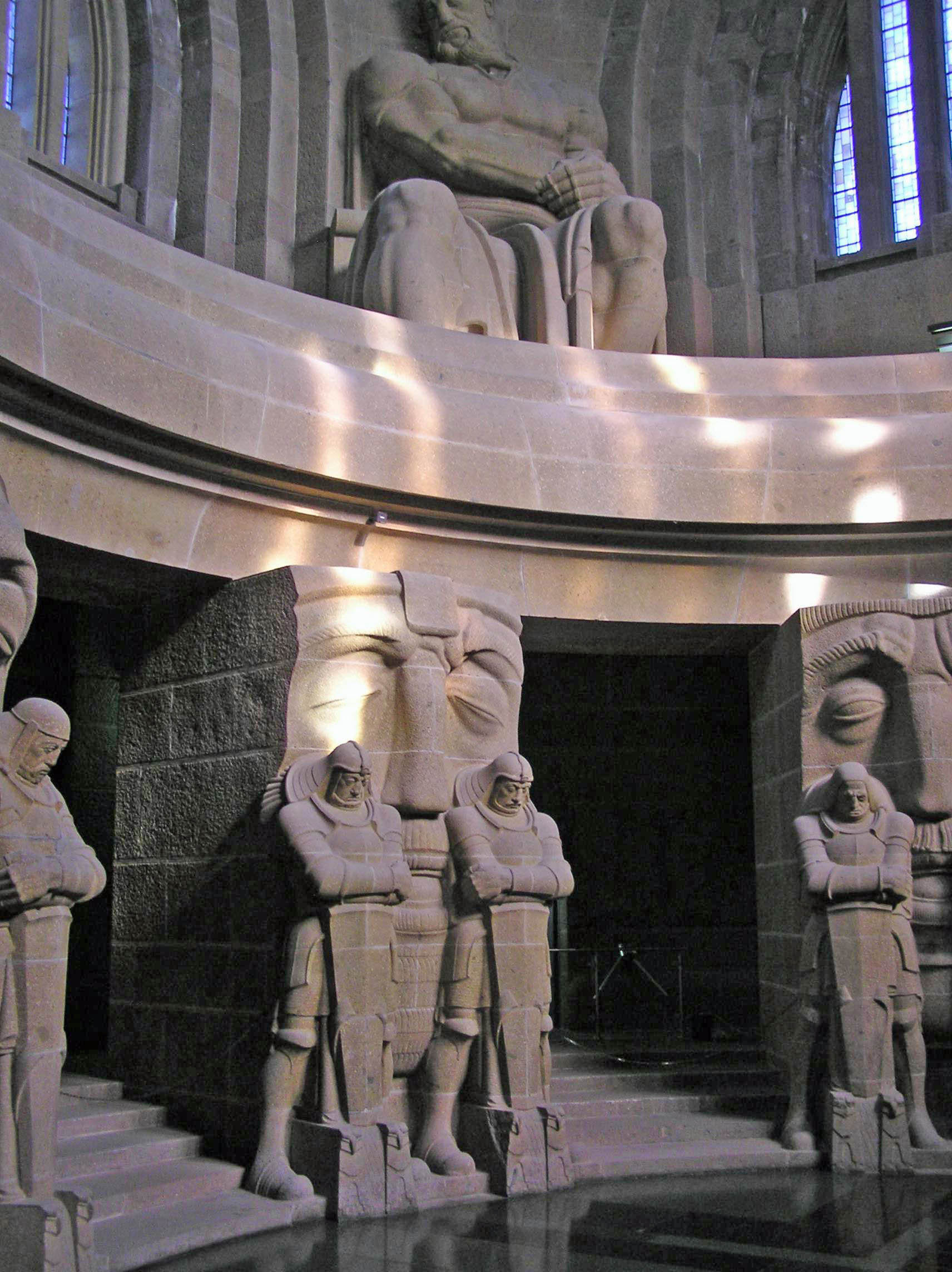
Franz Metzner's sculptural figures within the Völkerschlachtdenkmal in Leipzig

Metzer learned the craft of stone-cutting in Breslau with Christian Behrens and did apprenticeships in Saxony through 1894. He founded his own studio in Berlin in 1896 and worked predominantly for the royal porcelain factory until 1903, and became a professor at the Vienna college of arts and sciences. Metzner achieved fame by winning a gold medal at the Paris Exposition Universelle (1900).

Among his important works are the sculptures for Josef Hoffmann's 1904–1911 landmark Vienna Secession Stoclet Palace in Brussels, including the eccentric four green male nudes at the summit of the building. The Stoclet Palace is an example of Gesamtkunstwerk, the integration of art and architecture, one of the goals of Jugendstil, and it had notable influence on birth of Art Deco.

In 1910 Metzner met the vacationing Frank Lloyd Wright and, according to the scholarship of Anthony Alofsin, Metzer affected Wright's "conventionalization" of the human figure and its incorporation into buildings like the Larkin Building and Midway Gardens. Around the same time, Metzner's designs influenced Czech artists working in Prague, Stanislav Sucharda among them.

In 1913, he, alongside his teacher Behrens, created sculptures of strangely scaled interior figures for the "Hecker Tomb" of the Völkerschlachtdenkmal (People's Battle Monument), designed by the architect Bruno Schmitz in Leipzig. The monument was inaugurated by Kaiser Wilhelm II. It is a combination of Wilhelmine and Jugendstil styles.

Much of Metzner's work in Germany was lost in World War II.

== Other work ==
- Atlas figures, Zacherl House, Vienna, Austria, 1905, Jože Plečnik, architect
- Tomb for the paper manufacturer Max Krause in the Jerusalem Cemetery in Berlin, 1907, Bruno Schmitz architect
- Franz Stelzhamer Monument, Linz, Austria, 1908
- sculpture for the Ufa-Pavillon am Nollendorfplatz in Berlin, 1913, for architect Oskar Kaufmann
- Der Rüdigerbrunnen (the Rudiger well) in the Bavarian city of Kaufbeuren
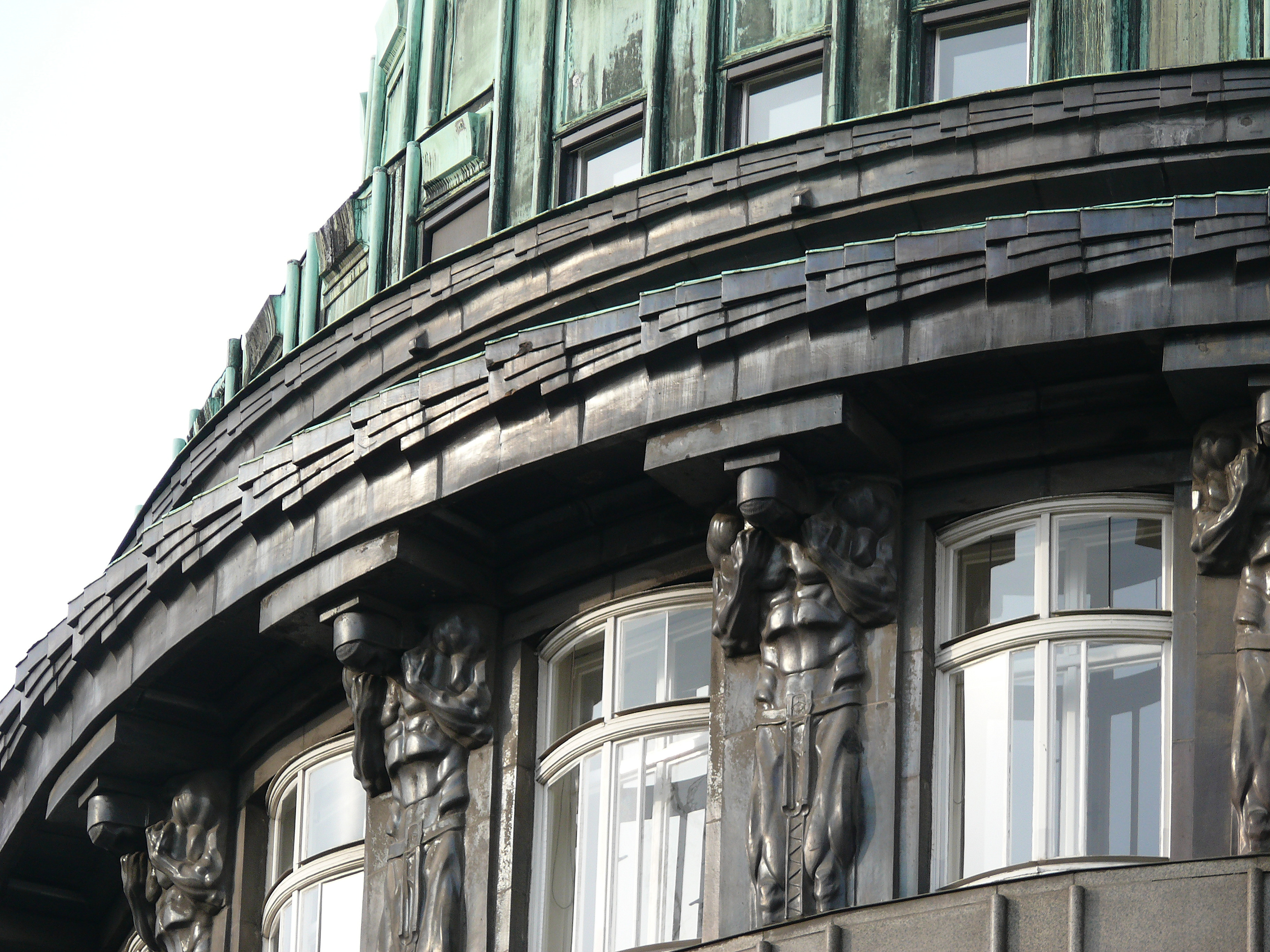
Atlas figures (1905), Zacherl House, Vienna, Austria, Jože Plečnik, architect.

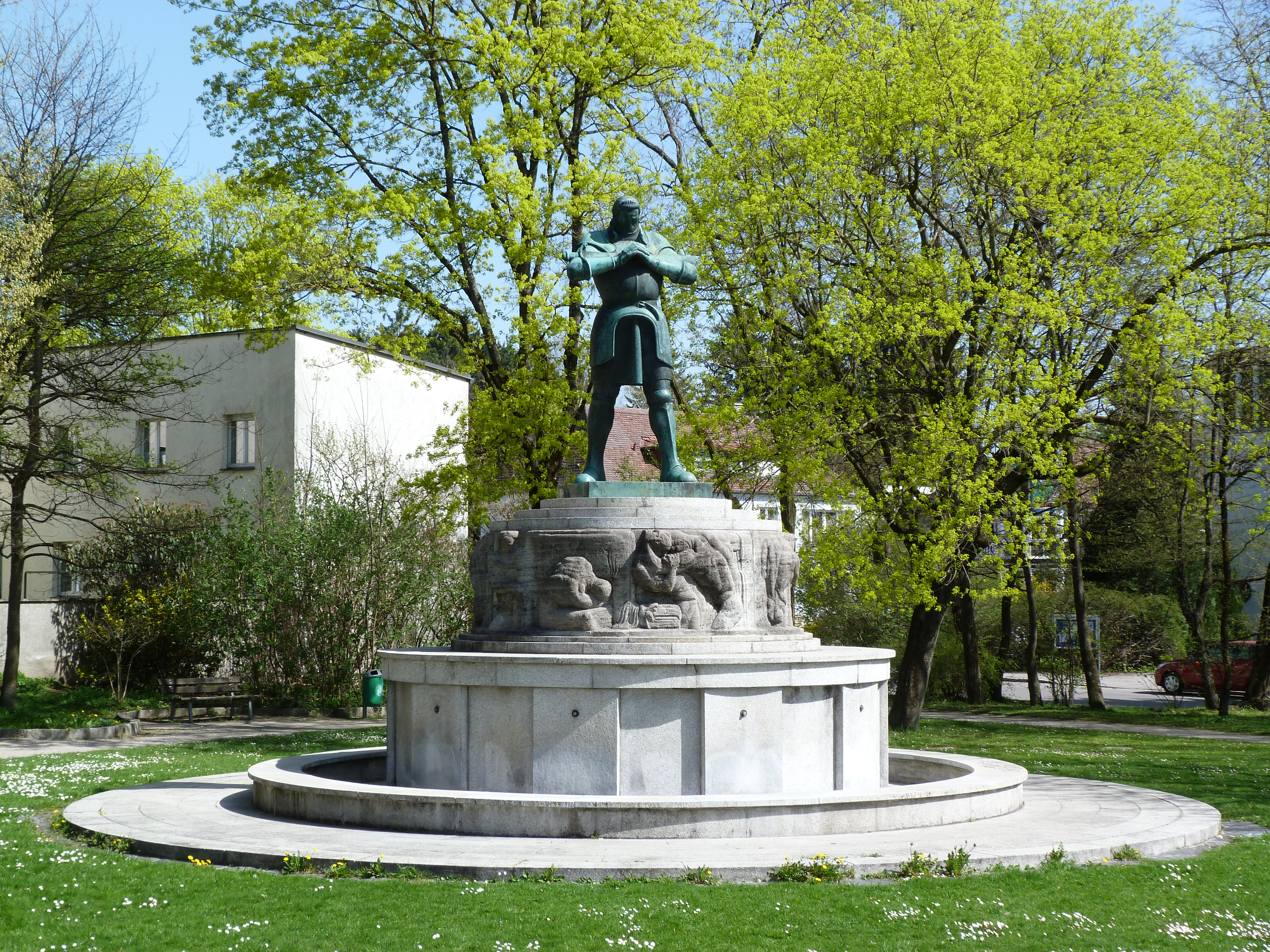
Der Rüdigerbrunnen (the Rudiger well), Kaufbeuren, Germany.

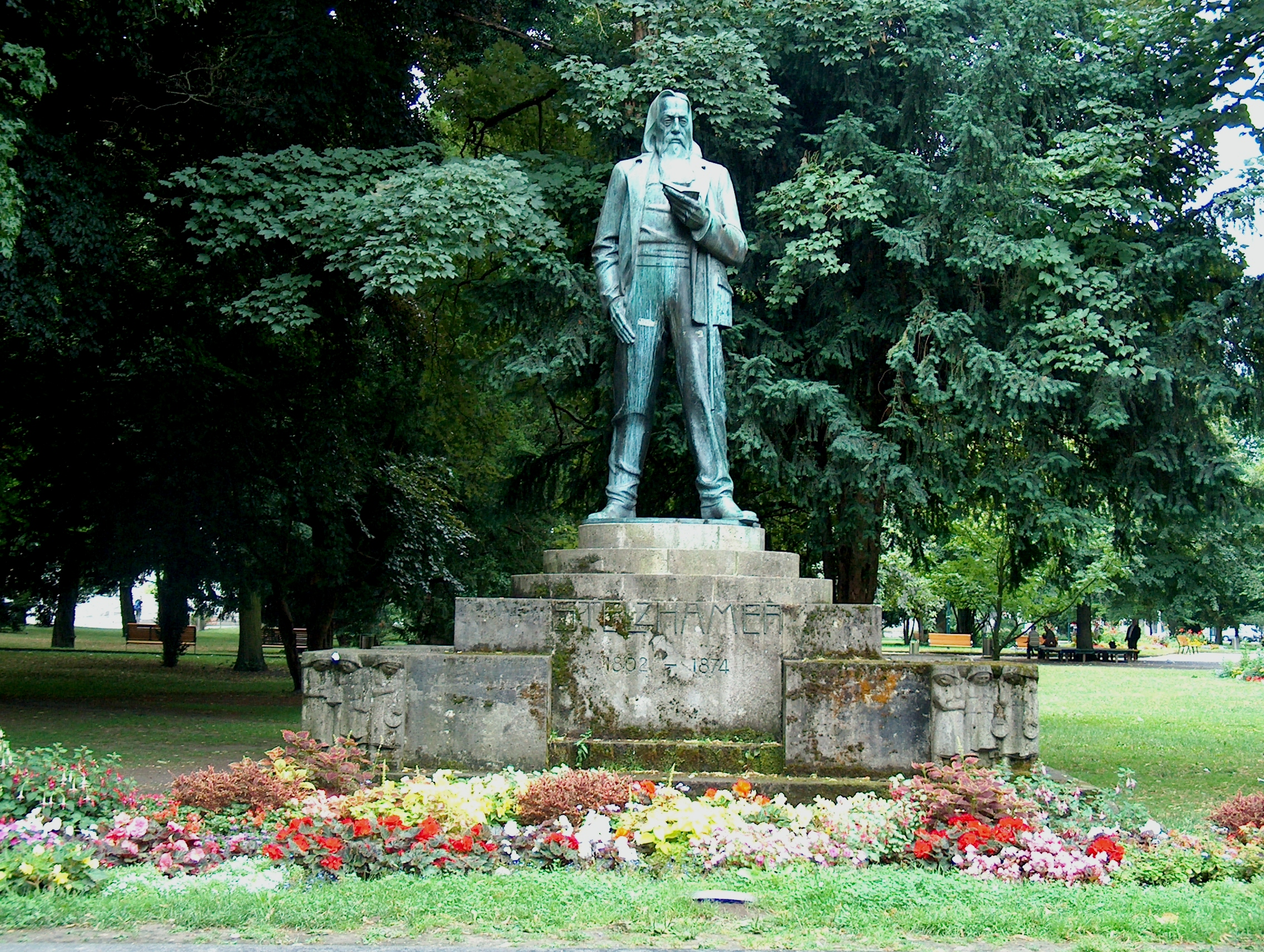
Franz Stelzhamer Monument (1908), Linz, Austria.

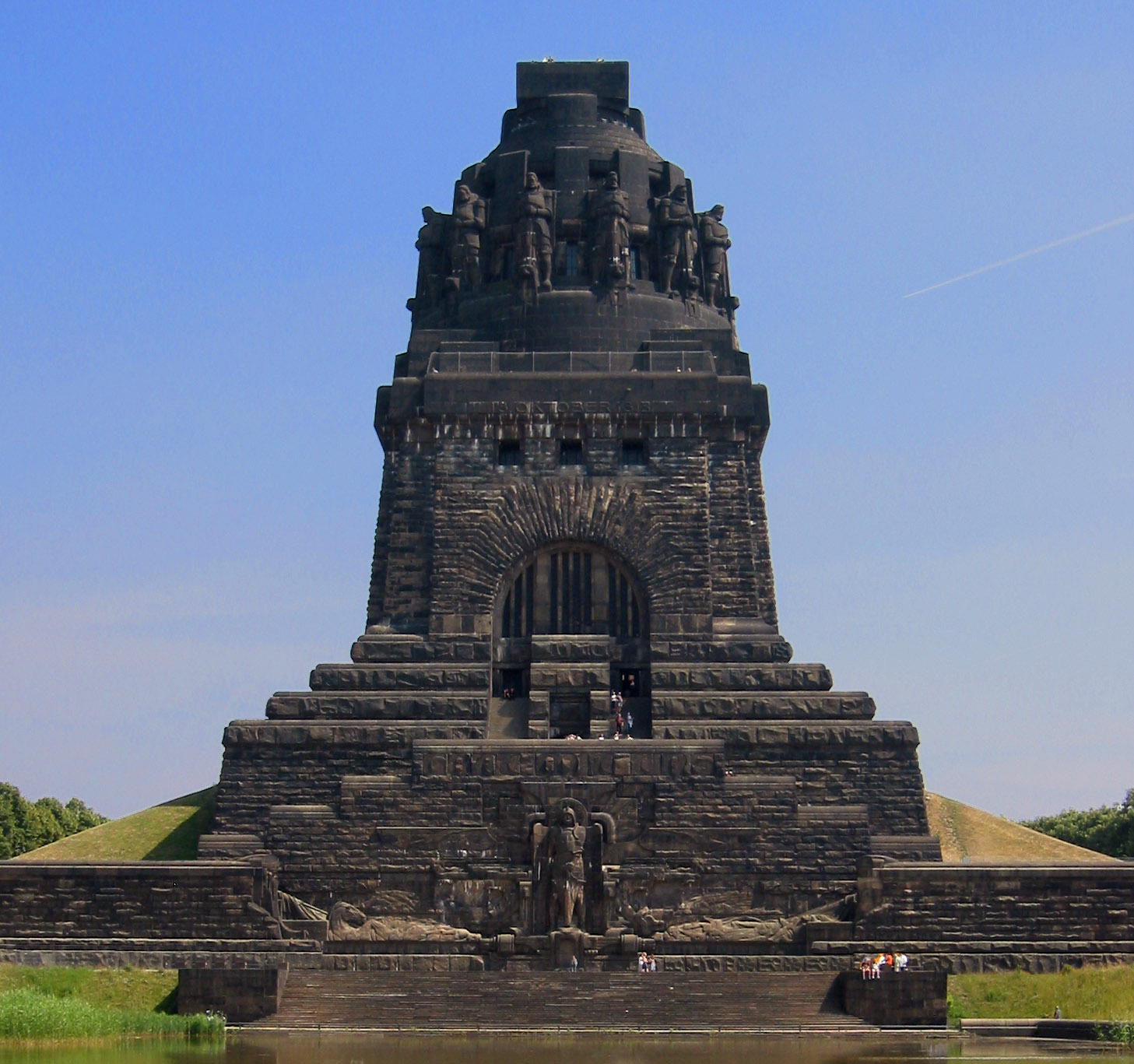
Voelkerschlachtdenkmal (1898-1913), Leipzig, Germany, Bruno Schmitz, architect.

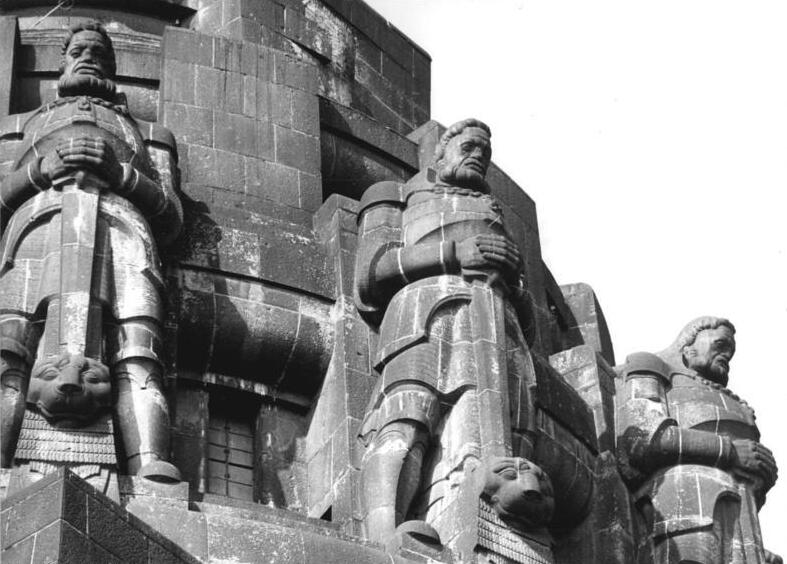
Wächterfiguren (Guards), encircling the dome of the Völkerschlachtdenkmal.

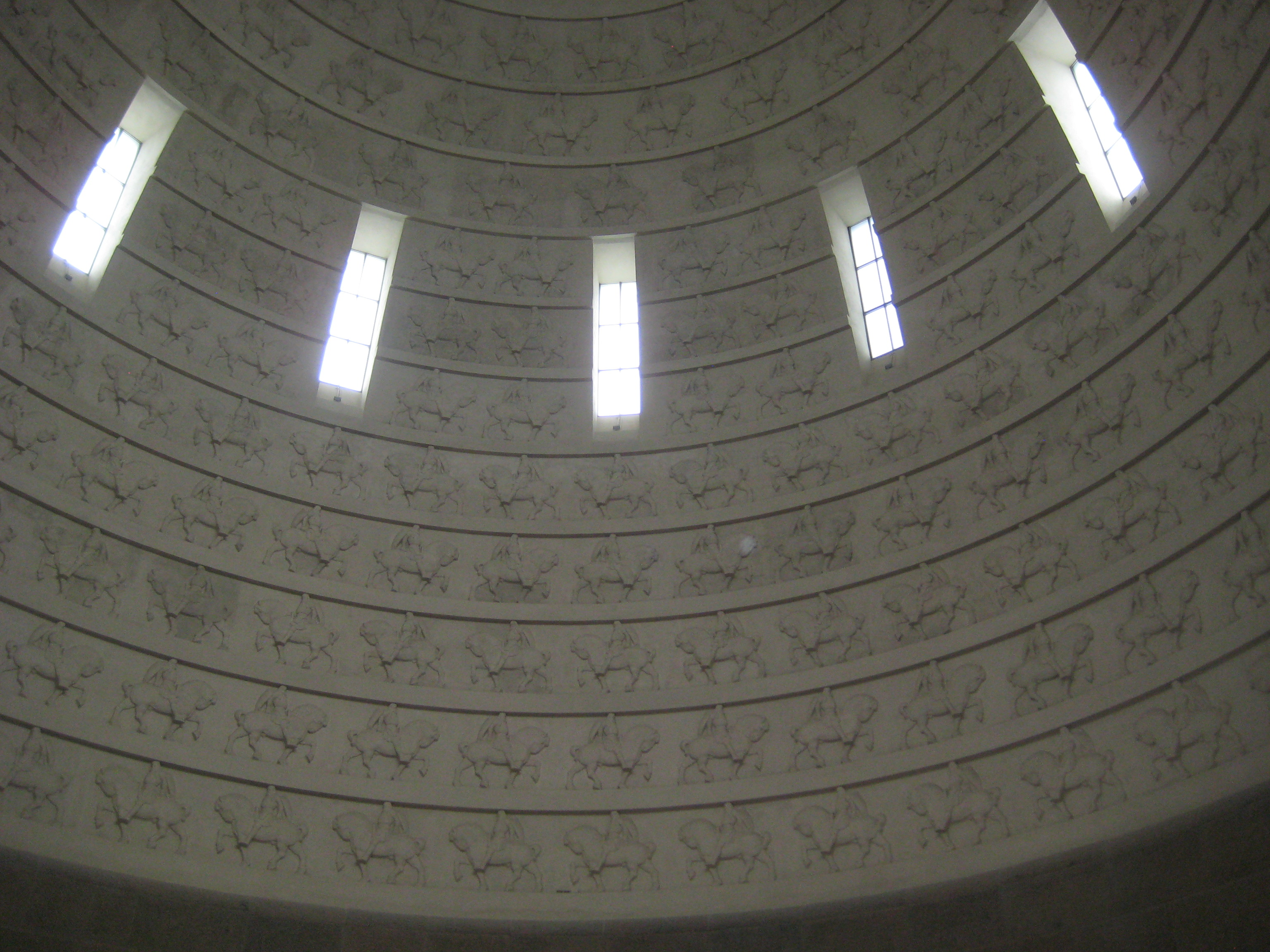
Interior of the dome of the Völkerschlachtdenkmal.

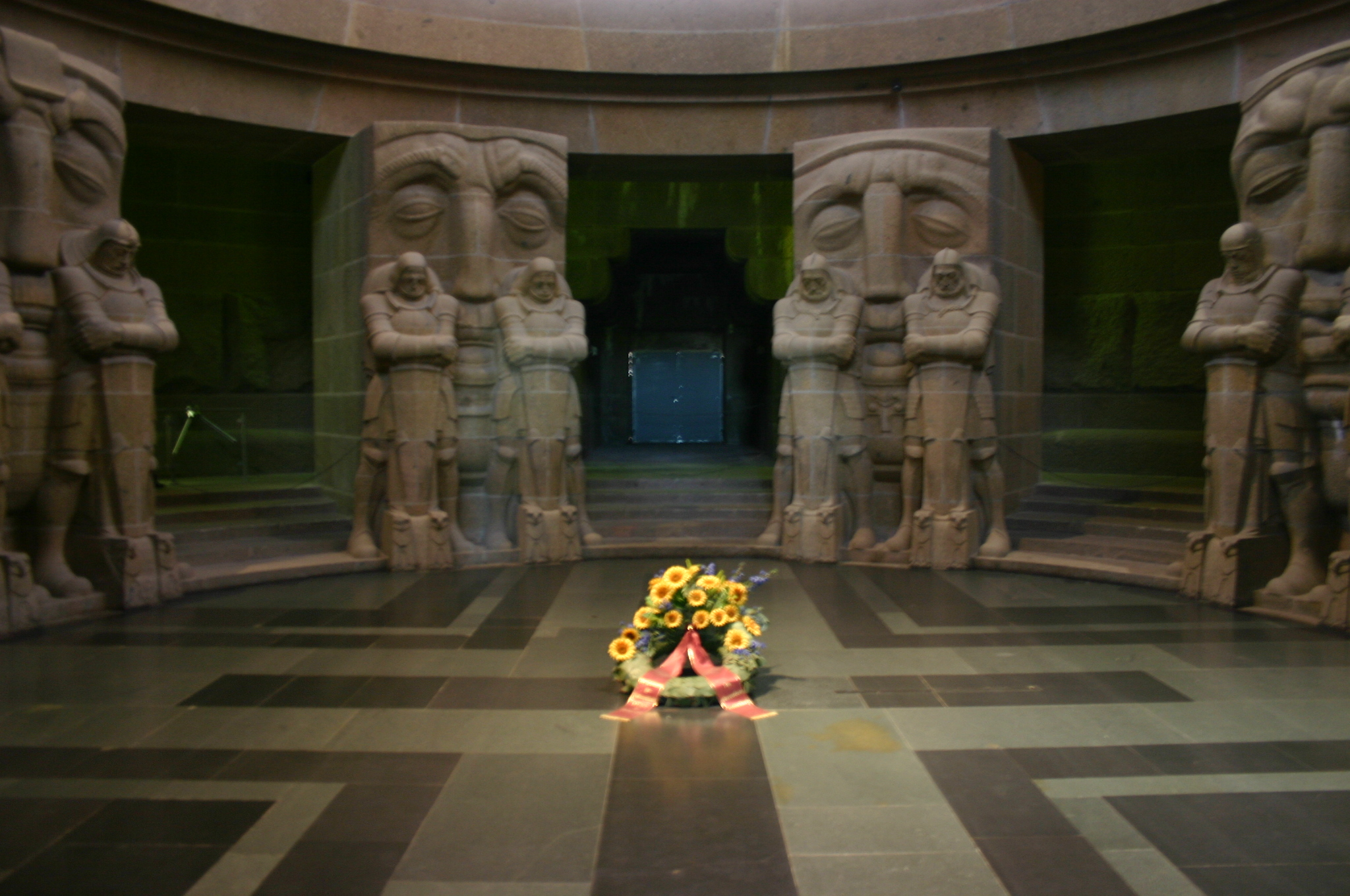
Masks of Fate, crypt of the Völkerschlachtdenkmal.
