= Oskar Kaufmann =

Hungarian architect (1873–1956)

- Born: Oskar Kaufmann; 2 February 1873; Újszentanna, Austria-Hungary
- Died: 22 June 1956; Budapest, Hungary
- Education: University of Karlsruhe, Karlsruhe
- Occupation: Architect

Oskar Kaufmann (2 February 1873 – 8 September 1956) was a Hungarian architect. He was an expert in construction and design and was active in Berlin beginning in 1900.

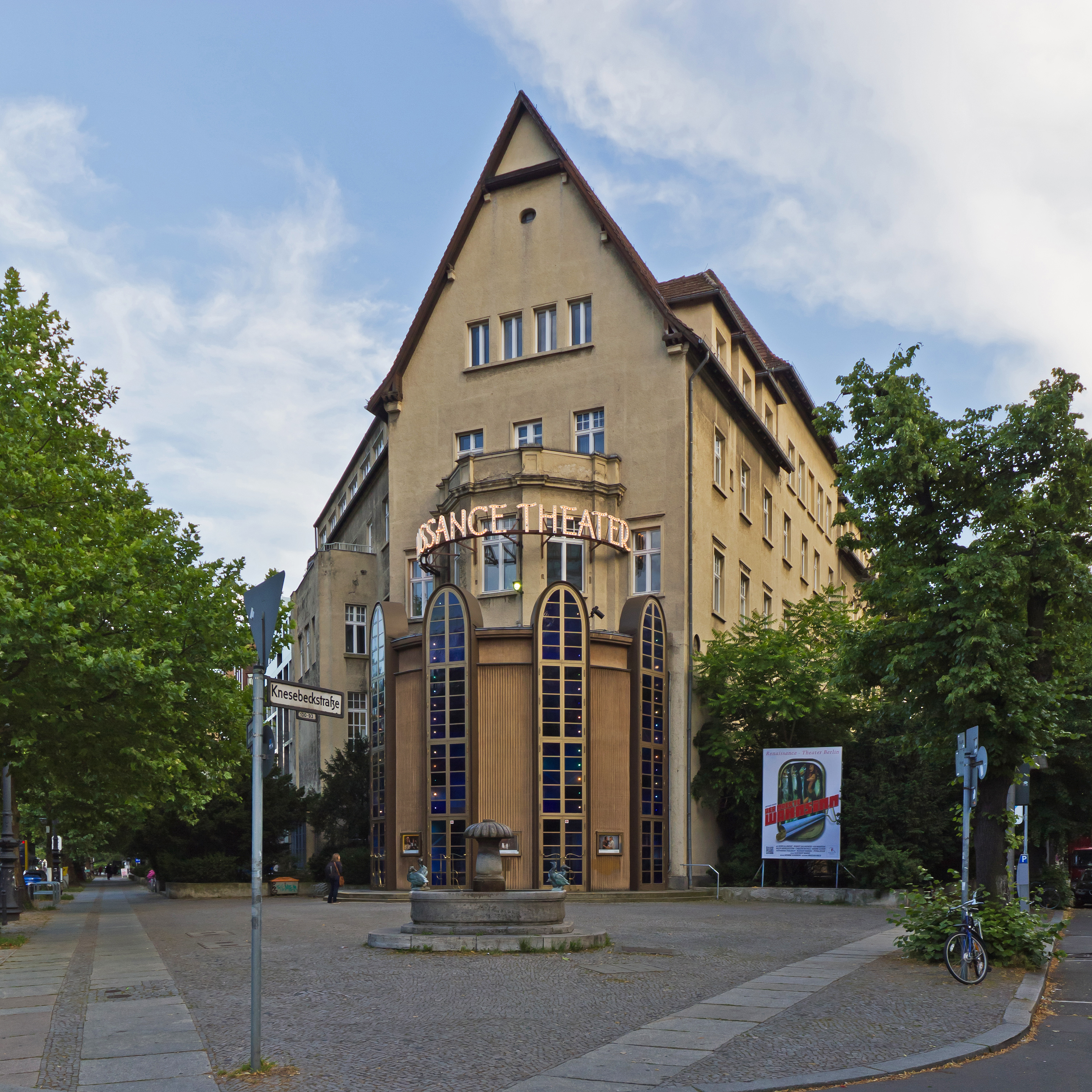
Renaissance Theater, Berlin

Among his best-known works are the Krolloper, the Hebbel Theater and the Renaissance Theater, all in Berlin, the Neue Stadttheater in Vienna, and the Habima Theater in Tel Aviv.

== Youth and Education ==
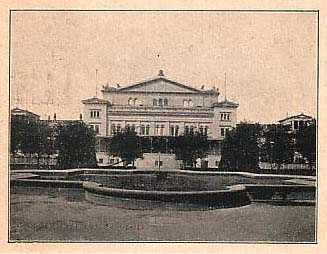
Krolloper, Berlin

Kaufmann was born in Újszentanna/Neu Sankt Anna (today Sântana), near Arad, Romania), the son of a wealthy and prestigious Jewish family in Hungary. After completing the Abitur, he began to study architecture at a university in Budapest. This created tension with his parents, who wished him to become a pianist. The tension was so great that Kaufmann's parents refused to support him financially, so that he had to leave Hungary and continue his education in Germany, at the Großherzogliche Technische Hochschule (English: Grand Ducal Technical College) in Karlsruhe. Ironically, he supported himself by working as a pianist. This placed him in contact with many people from the local opera scene, among them the then-director of the Karlsruhe Hofoper (Court Opera), composer Felix Mottl. Mottl appreciated Kaufmann's skills as a pianist, and he and other musical contacts of Kaufmann's would prove to be important influences on his later architectural work.

Among Kaufmann's teachers during his studies were Josef Durm, Otto Warth, Carl Schäfer, and Max Laeuger. Kaufmann graduated with his engineering diploma on 14 December 1899, with a grade of "good".

Also during his education in Karlsruhe, Kaufmann met his future bride, Emma Gönner, daughter of the mayor of the town of Baden-Baden. They married in 1903, at which point Kaufmann converted to Christianity at his father-in-law's behest.

== Early Berlin years ==
In Berlin, Kaufmann got a job in the architectural firm of the well-known theater construction firm of Bernhard Sehring. He was assigned to construct a new theater in the city of Bielefeld. It was his first solo project, and was influenced by the work of another Karlsruhe architect, Hermann Billings, whom Kaufmann never actually met in person, although they lived in Karlsruhe at the same time. The influence of Alfred Messel's works can also be seen in the building's design.

== Self-establishment ==
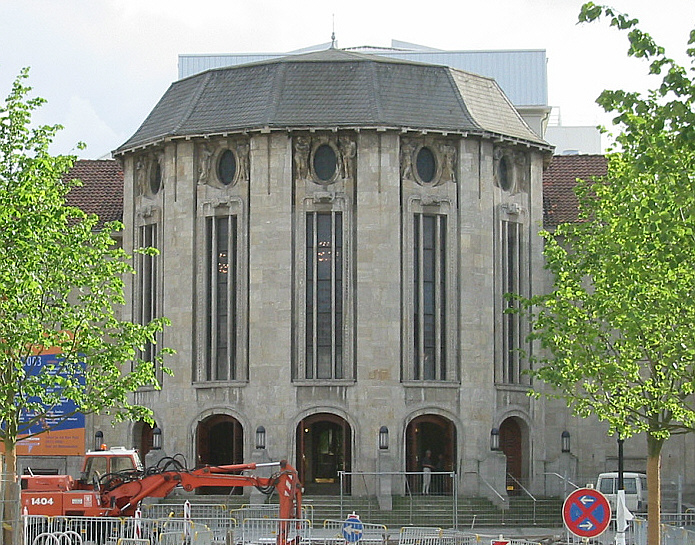
Stadttheater Bremerhaven

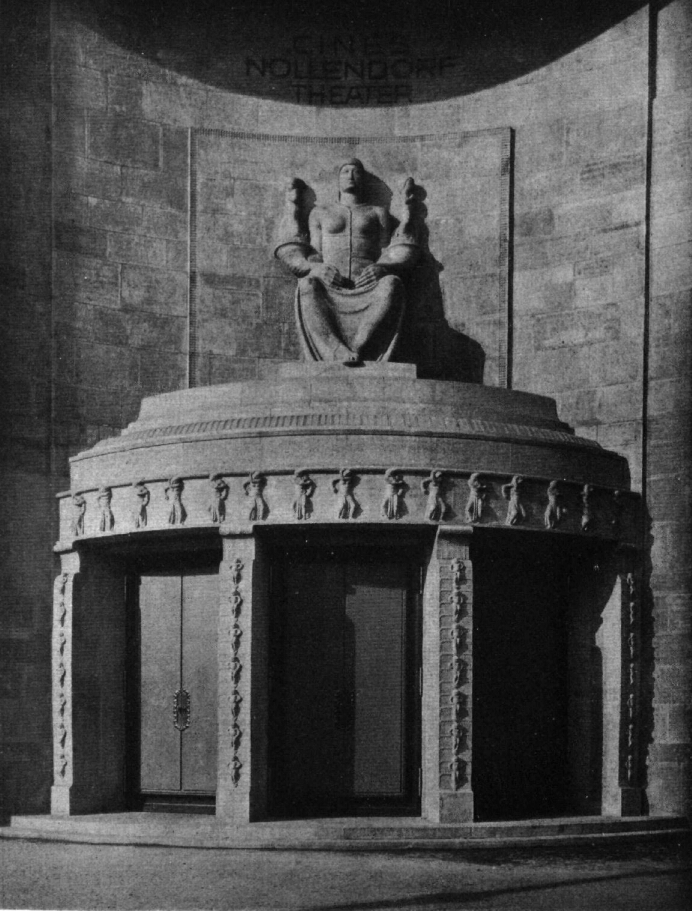
Main entrance to the Ufa-Pavillon am Nollendorfplatz, with sculpture by Franz Metzner

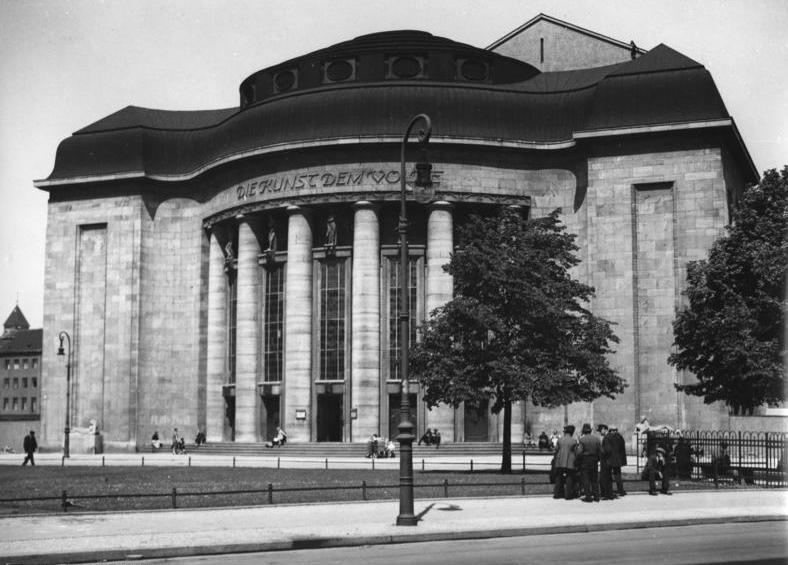
Volksbühne theater on Rosa-Luxemburg-Platz in Berlin

From 1905 until 1908, Kaufmann worked on small projects in Sehring's office, such as a bed and breakfast in Berlin that would later be destroyed in World War II. He was also contacted to coordinate the décor for a bedroom used by the Wertheim company. This job put Kaufmann into contact with theater entrepreneur and director Eugen Robert. Robert commissioned Kaufmann to help him in the construction of a new theater he was planning, as Robert had been deeply impressed with the theater Kaufmann had built in Bielefeld. In connection with this and other works Kaufmann constructed while in Sehring's office, Kaufmann established his own architecture firm in 1908, on Luitpoldstraße in the Schöneberg section of Berlin. The firm later moved to Ansbacherstraße in Charlottenburg. The theater that Robert commissioned Kaufmann to build, the Hebbel Theater, gained Kaufmann his first widespread recognition. However, his perceived inexperience still counted against him, as he was not invited to make a bid on the renovation of the Stadttheater Bremerhaven. Only after one of the three architects invited to make a bid, Max Littmann, bowed out of the running, was Kaufmann invited to take his place.

It was therefore significant when Kaufmann was selected, by a jury including such notable architects as Max Liebermann and Otto March, to design a new building for the Charlottenburg opera. However, for various reasons this never came to fruition. Nonetheless, his work on the Bremerhaven and Hebbel theaters, as well as his selection by the Charlottenburg jury, all served to give Kaufmann a strong reputation as a theater architect. When the decision to exclude Kaufmann from a competition to redesign the Berlin Royal Opera for the technical reason that he had not received German citizenship in his thirty years in Germany, was met with scorn and disagreement in the press and among architectural experts, his newfound reputation was only confirmed.

Kaufmann designed Berlin's first free-standing, purpose-built cinema, the Ufa-Pavillon am Nollendorfplatz in 1912–1913, and the Berlin Volksbühne in 1913–1914; the sculptor Franz Metzner collaborated with him on both these projects.

== Collaboration with Eugen Stolzer ==
During construction of the new City Theater of Bremerhaven, Kaufmann met the young Hungarian architect Eugen Stolzer. Stolzer had studied at the Technical University of Munich from 1904 to 1908 and had won the Hungarian National Architecture award as well as a prize from the École des Beaux-Arts in Paris. Stolzer made blueprints for Kaufmann, who was so impressed with him that in 1916 he made him chief partner in his architectural firm. Stolzer and Kaufmann designed many of their buildings together, and had extremely similar styles.

== World War I and the 20s ==
Because he lacked German citizenship, Kaufmann was not drafted into the German military during World War I. He used this time to further his architectural firm. However, the war had a negative impact on the amount of business Kaufmann's firm received, although he did receive an offer, never executed, from Max Reinhardt, head of the influential Volksbühne (Folk Stage), to build a new ballet theater. It is not clear whether Reinhardt seriously wanted Kaufmann to build the new theater or not. From then on, Kaufmann decided to take private commissions.

== Private commissions ==
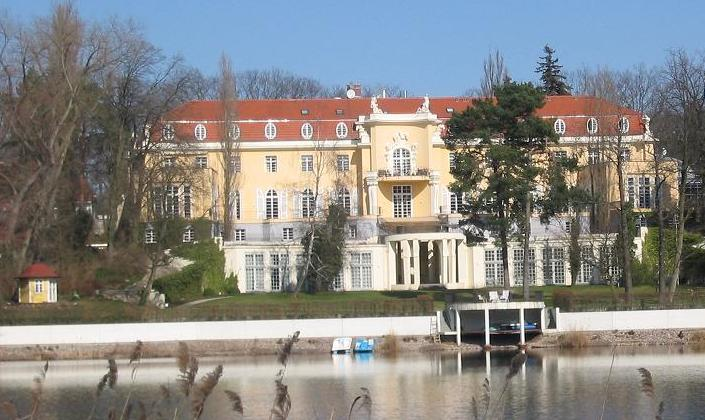
Villa Konschewski Berlin, designed for Pommeranian paper manufacturer Dr. Moritz Konschewski

Kaufmann also worked on private projects. In 1917 he accepted the commission by Leo Lewin for the interior of his villa in Breslau. Some of Kaufmann's first private commissions consisted of a series of villas built in and around Berlin, many of which still survive. Kaufmann, however, soon grew to dislike designing villas and other single-family dwellings, as they did not prove financially profitable enough for his firm. He returned to theater building and constructed two notable theaters during this time, the Theater am Kurfürstendamm and the Krolloper. The latter took nine years to build, from 1920 to 1929.

== Interior design ==
Especially Kaufmann's style of his interiors can be described as non puristic. In 1928 art critic Max Osborn invented the term Expressionist Rococo to describe Kaufmann's work. Some furniture designed by Kaufmann was exhibited for the first time after World War II in 2015 by Markus Winter at Lampedo Gallery, New York. In 2016 the Bröhan Museum showed his furniture in the exhibition Deutschland gegen Frankreich – Der Kampf um den Stil.

== Crisis and emigration ==
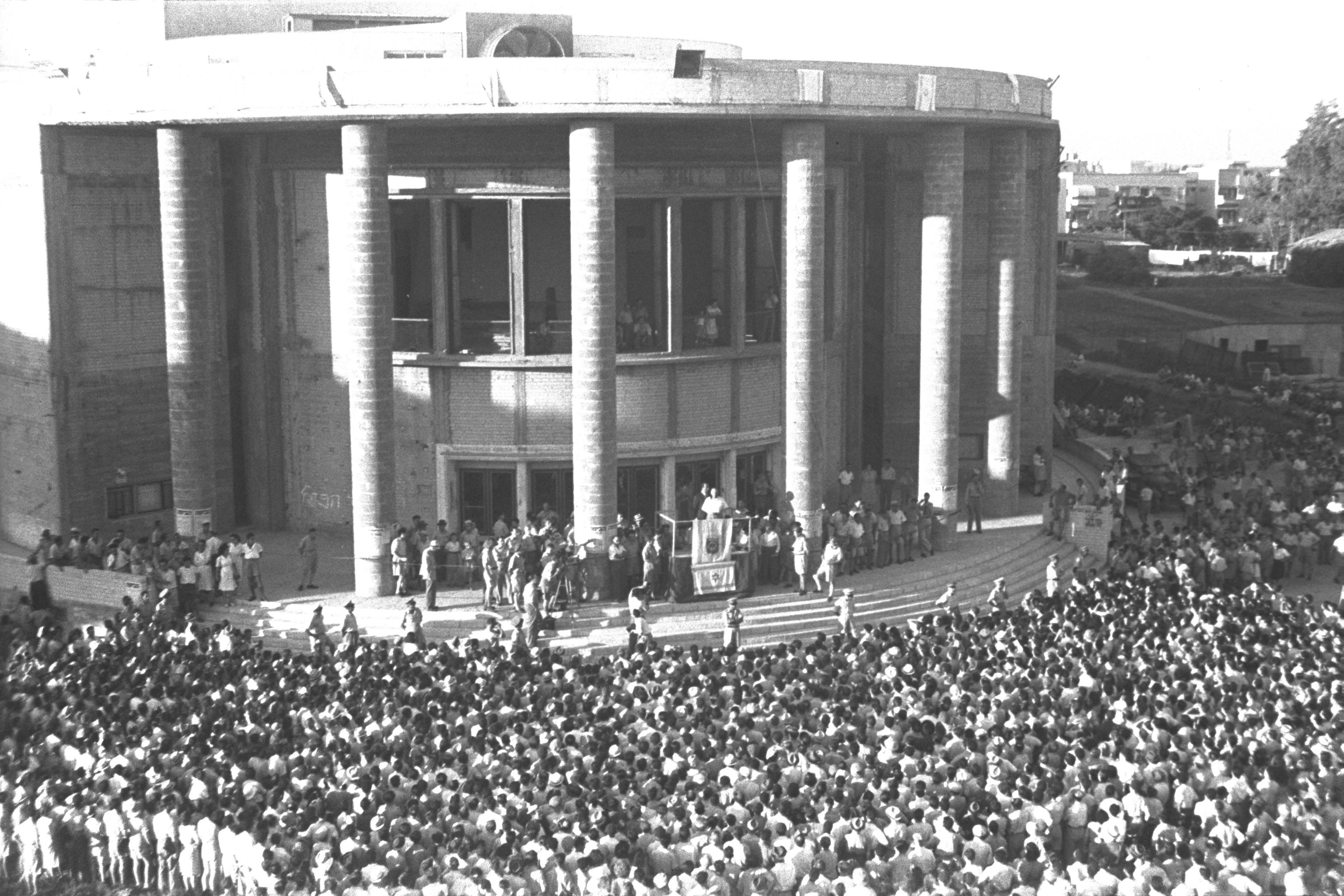
Habima Theater, Tel Aviv

The Great Depression, although it did not affect Kaufmann's firm as strongly as many of his business contacts, caused a marked decline in the number of commissions his firm received. The Machtergreifung, or seizure of power by the Nazi Party in January 1933, caused Kaufmann's partner Stolzer to flee to Palestine in May of that year, and Kaufmann himself followed Stolzer to Palestine in September.

A Moscow-based theater group, the Habima group, wished to build a new theater in the city of Tel Aviv. The project was first given to another German architect, Erich Mendelsohn, but the bid was withdrawn after Mendelsohn showed too little interest in the project. It was then offered to Kaufmann, who soon accepted, and moved his family to Palestine. In addition to this theater, he built a cinema for the city of Haifa, and a row of private apartments. However, in Palestine Kaufmann was unable to attain the same success and reputation that he had attained in Berlin. On top of that, the economic situation in Palestine was quite poor, so much so that Kaufmann received no more commissions after 1937.

== Return to Europe ==
Because of the Palestinian economic situation, Kaufmann was forced to return to Europe in 1939. His many contacts helped him on his journey, but the outbreak of World War II kept him from reaching his intended final destination, England. The new, restrictive travel laws also made it impossible for Kaufmann to travel back to Palestine, as it was a British protectorate at the time. After September 1940, Kaufmann and his wife settled in Bucharest. However, the rising pressure put on the Romanian Jewish community by the fascist government of Ion Antonescu and Horia Sima forced them to move once again, to Hungary. The situation for Jewish war refugees in Hungary was better than in surrounding countries, but still grim. Kaufmann's wife was not able to survive the harsh conditions and died in Hungary in 1942. Kaufmann avoided the mass deportation of Jews that took place in Hungary in 1944, but he was without income and found his financial situation worsening.

== Final years ==
In 1947, the new Hungarian government, under President Zoltán Tildy, decreed that any artist over the age of 60, which included the then 74-year-old Kaufmann, would receive a state pension. Kaufmann was also able to continue his architectural work through government commissions. When Kaufmann died in Budapest at the age of 83 in 1956, he had produced two more theaters. His final work, which was completed four years after his death, was the renovation of the Madách Theater in Budapest.

== Literature ==
- Berkovich, Gary. Reclaiming a History. Jewish Architects in Imperial Russia and the USSR. Volume 2. Soviet Avant-garde: 1917–1933. Weimar und Rostock: Grunberg Verlag. 2021. P. 193. ISBN 978-3-933713-63-6
