= Expressionist Rococo =

Architectural style

The term "Expressionist Rococo" was first used in 1928 by Max Osborn to describe the Theater am Kurfürstendamm in Berlin designed by Oskar Kaufmann. As a difference from the original Rococo design, Kaufmann emphasizes on the dynamic and movement as a whole concept. Asymmetrical details are subordinated to a large symmetrical frame. Other protagonists of this style were Hans Poelzig, Leo Nachtlicht and Gerhard Schliepstein.
