= Bruno Schmitz =

German architect

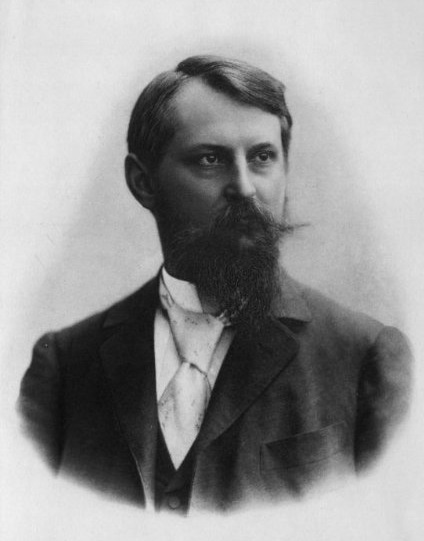
- Schmitz c. 1900
- Born: Georg Bruno Schmitz; 21 November 1858; Düsseldorf, Kingdom of Prussia
- Died: 27 April 1916 (aged 57); Berlin, German Empire
- Education: Königliches Gymnasium; Kunstakademie Düsseldorf
- Occupation: Architect
- Practice: Historicism; Modern architecture
- Buildings: See Selected works

Bruno Schmitz (21 November 1858 – 27 April 1916) was a German architect born in Düsseldorf who was among the architects favored by Emperor Wilhelm II during the German Empire. He designed several monumental national memorials in Germany, including the Kyffhäuser Monument and major memorials in Leipzig, Koblenz, and at Porta Westfalica. Schmitz also undertook international work, including the design of a pavilion for the St. Louis World’s Fair and the Soldiers' and Sailors' Monument in Indianapolis, and died in Berlin in 1916 as a professor of architecture.

== Career ==
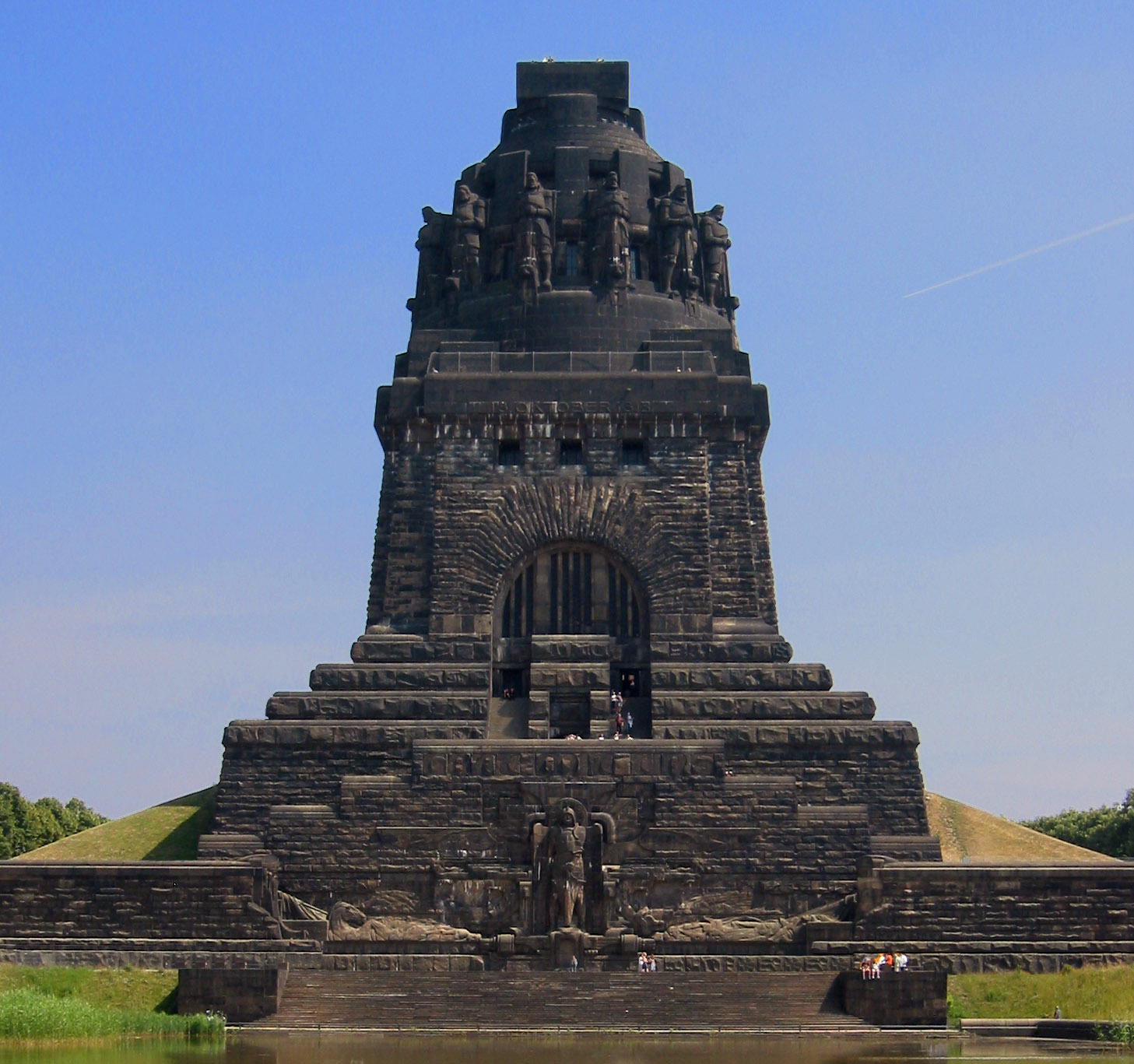
Völkerschlachtdenkmal (Monument to the Battle of the Nations) (1898–1913), Leipzig.

Bruno Schmitz was the architect of the Kyffhäuser Monument, which was constructed between 1891 and 1897 on the initiative of German veterans’ and soldiers’ association. In addition to the Kyffhäuser Monument, he designed several large national monuments in Germany, including the Völkerschlachtdenkmal (Monument to the Battle of the Nations) in Leipzig and monuments dedicated to Emperor Wilhelm I at the Deutsches Eck in Koblenz and at Porta Westfalica.

Schmitz also worked internationally. His projects outside Germany included the design of the German Pavilion (“Das Deutsche Haus”) for the 1904 St. Louis World’s Fair in the United States.

== Selected works ==
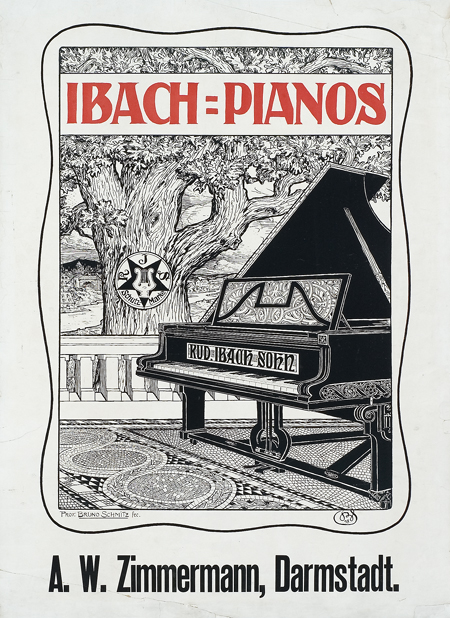
Poster "Ibach-Pianos", 1898 by Bruno Schmitz

- Geschäftshaus (commercial building) (1883), Düsseldorf.
- Kyffhäuser Monument (1889–96), Porta Westfalica, with Emil Hundrieser and Nikolaus Geiger, sculptors.
- Kaiser Wilhelm Monument (1890–96), Teutoburg Forest, Porta Westfalica, with Caspar von Zumbusch, sculptor.
- Deutsches Eck Monument (1894–97), Koblenz, with Emil Hundrieser, sculptor.
- Kaiserin Augusta Monument (1896), Koblenz, with Karl Friedrich Moest, sculptor.
- Völkerschlachtdenkmal (Monument to the Battle of the Nations) (1898–1913), Leipzig, with Clemens Thieme, architect, and Franz Metzner, sculptor.
- Bismarckturm (Bismark Tower) (1899–1900), Unna.
- Villa Stockwerk (1899–1902), Cologne.
- Mannheimer Rosengarten (1899–1903), Friedrichsplatz, Mannheim.
- Kaiser Wilhelm Monument (1901), Halle.
- Automat Commercial Building (1904–05), Berlin.
- Weinhaus Rheingold (Rheingold Wine House) (1905–06), Berlin (destroyed).
- Carl Hoffman Tomb, Old St. Matthew's Church, Berlin, with Nikolaus Geiger, sculptor.
- A number of the Bismarck towers.

=== United States ===
- Indiana Soldiers and Sailors' Monument (1888–1902), Monument Circle, Indianapolis, Indiana.
- German Pavilion (1904), Saint Louis World's Fair, Saint Louis, Missouri.
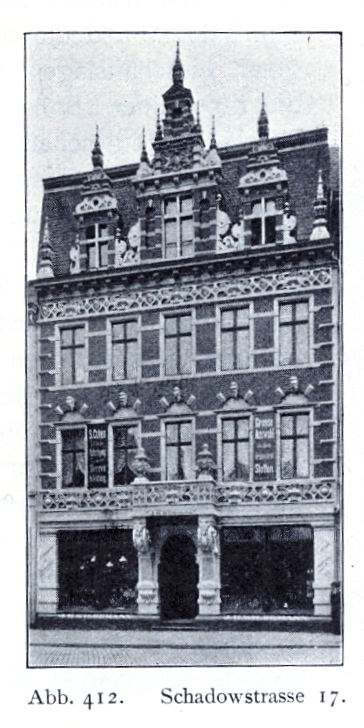
Geschäftshaus (commercial building) (1883), Düsseldorf.

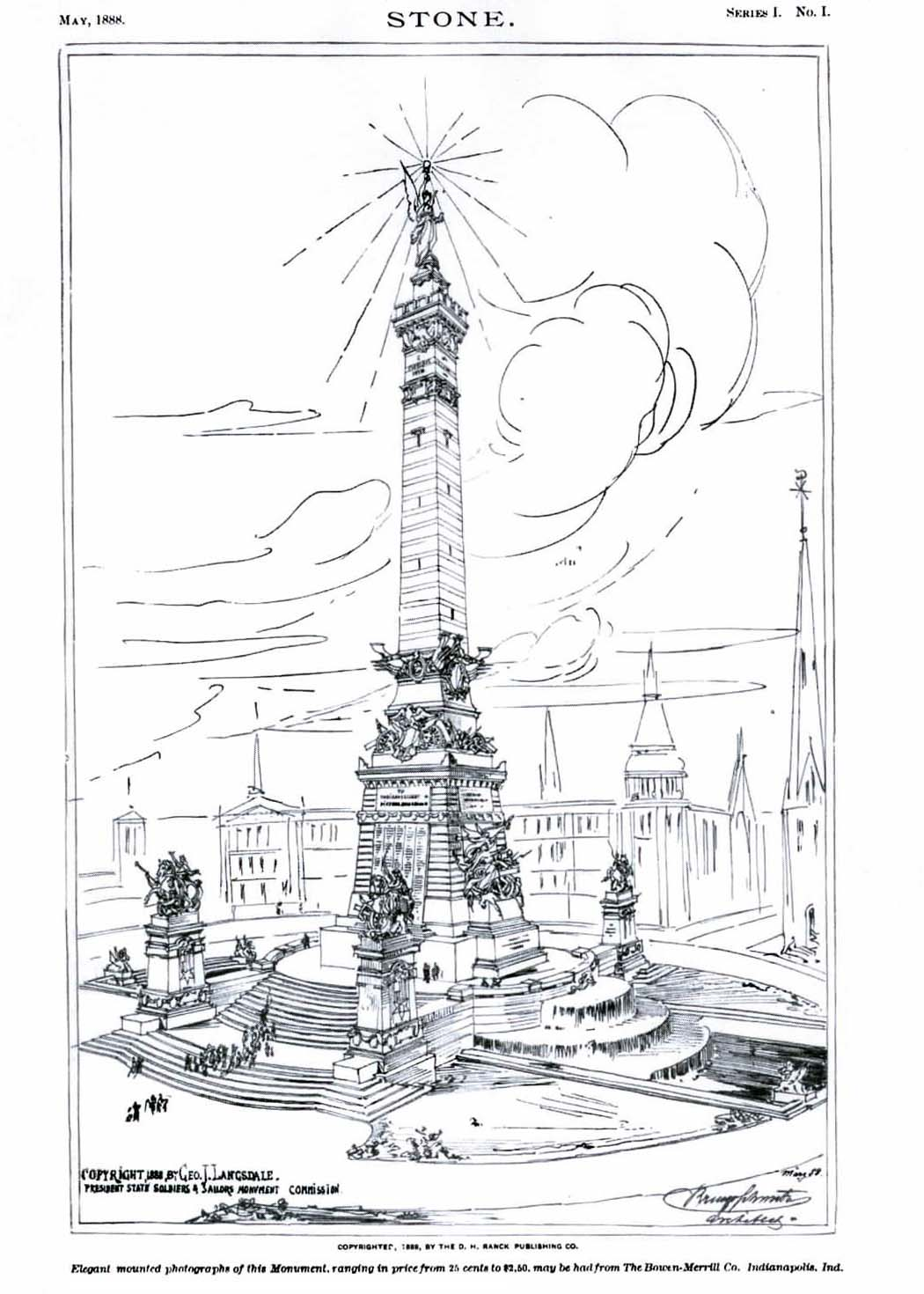
The Symbol of Indiana. Schmitz's 1888 rendering for the Soldiers' and Sailors' Monument in Indianapolis, Indiana.

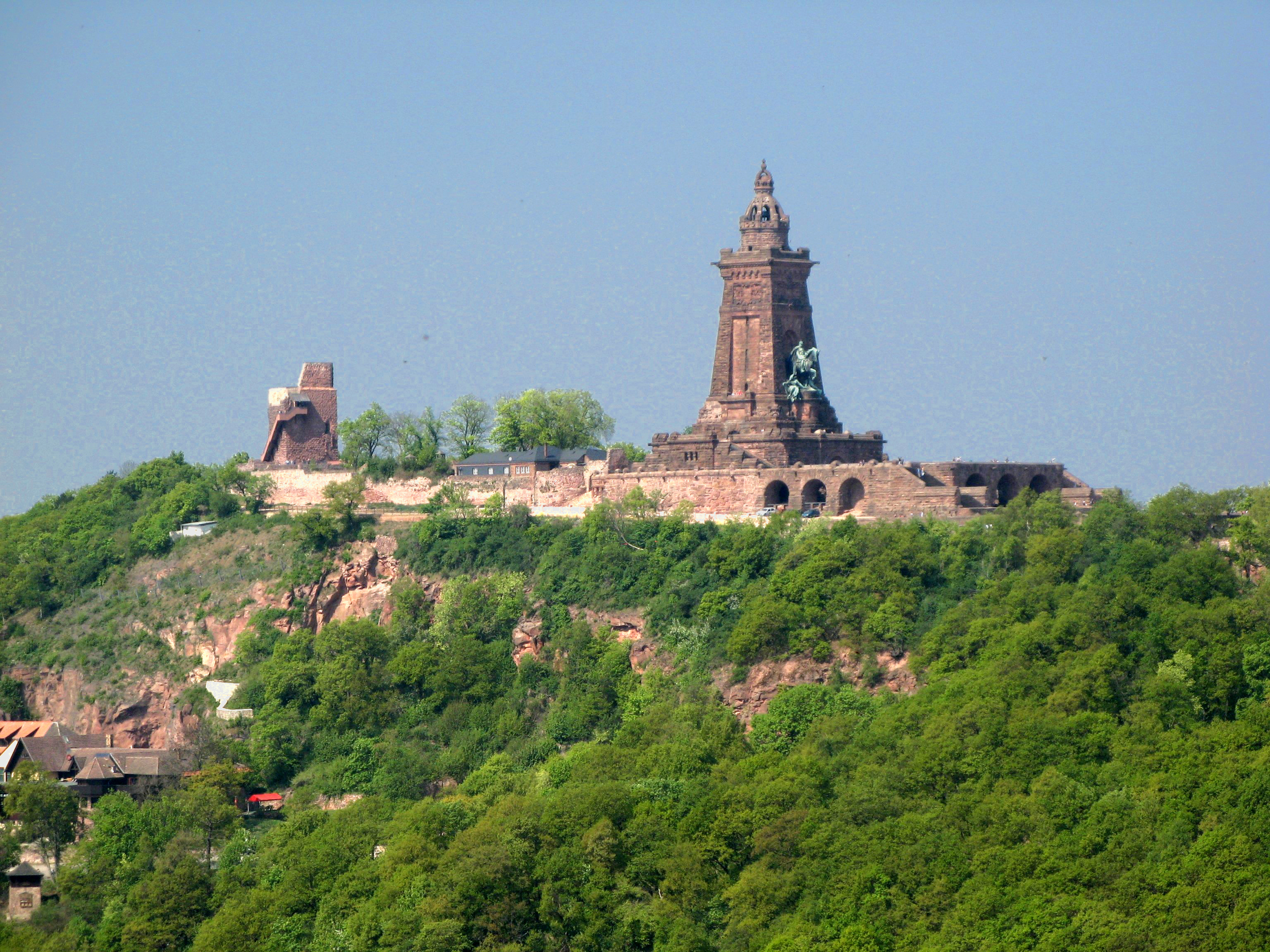
Kyffhäuser Monument (1889–96).

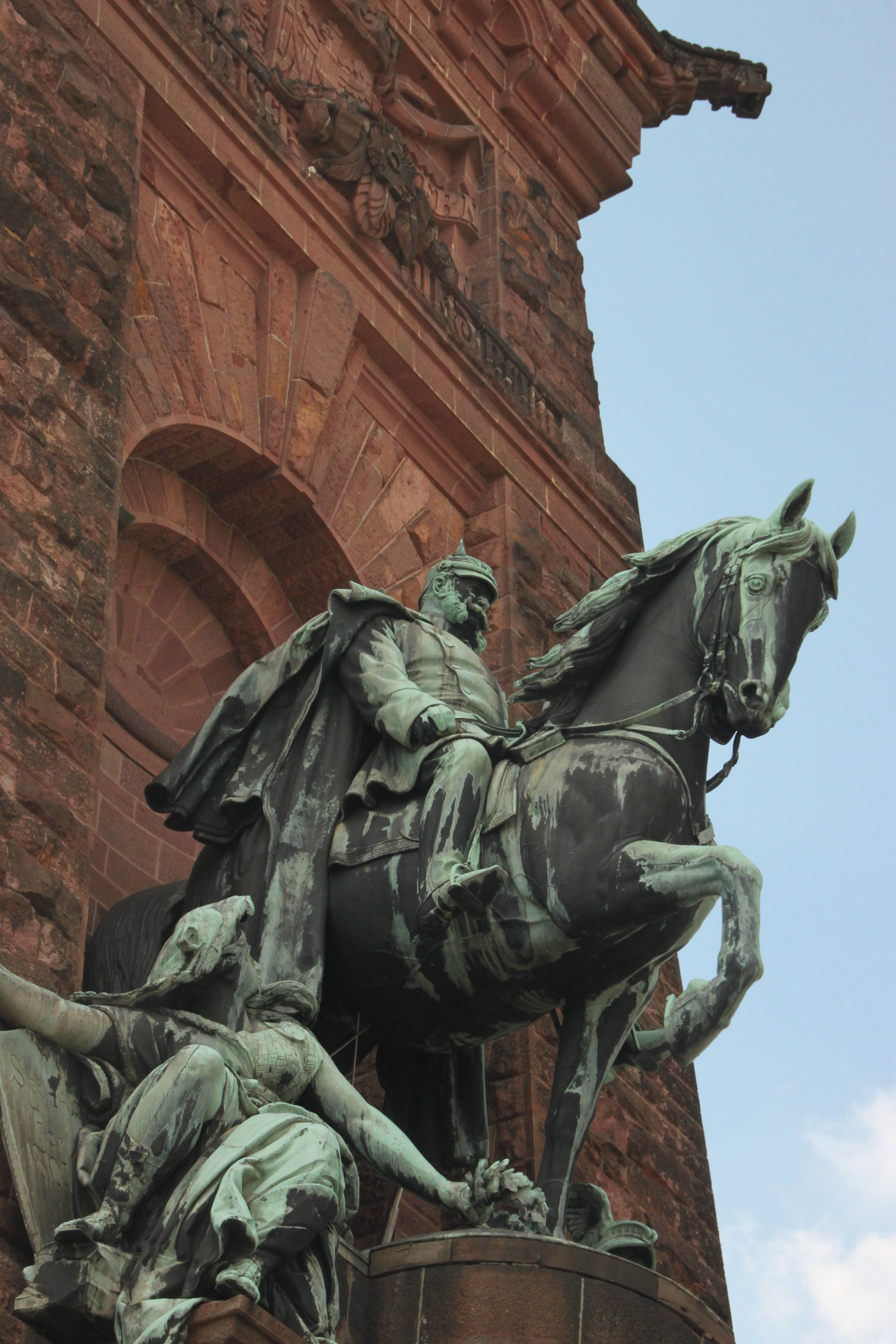
Equestrian statue of Kaiser Wilhelm I by Emil Hundrieser, Kyffhäuser Monument].

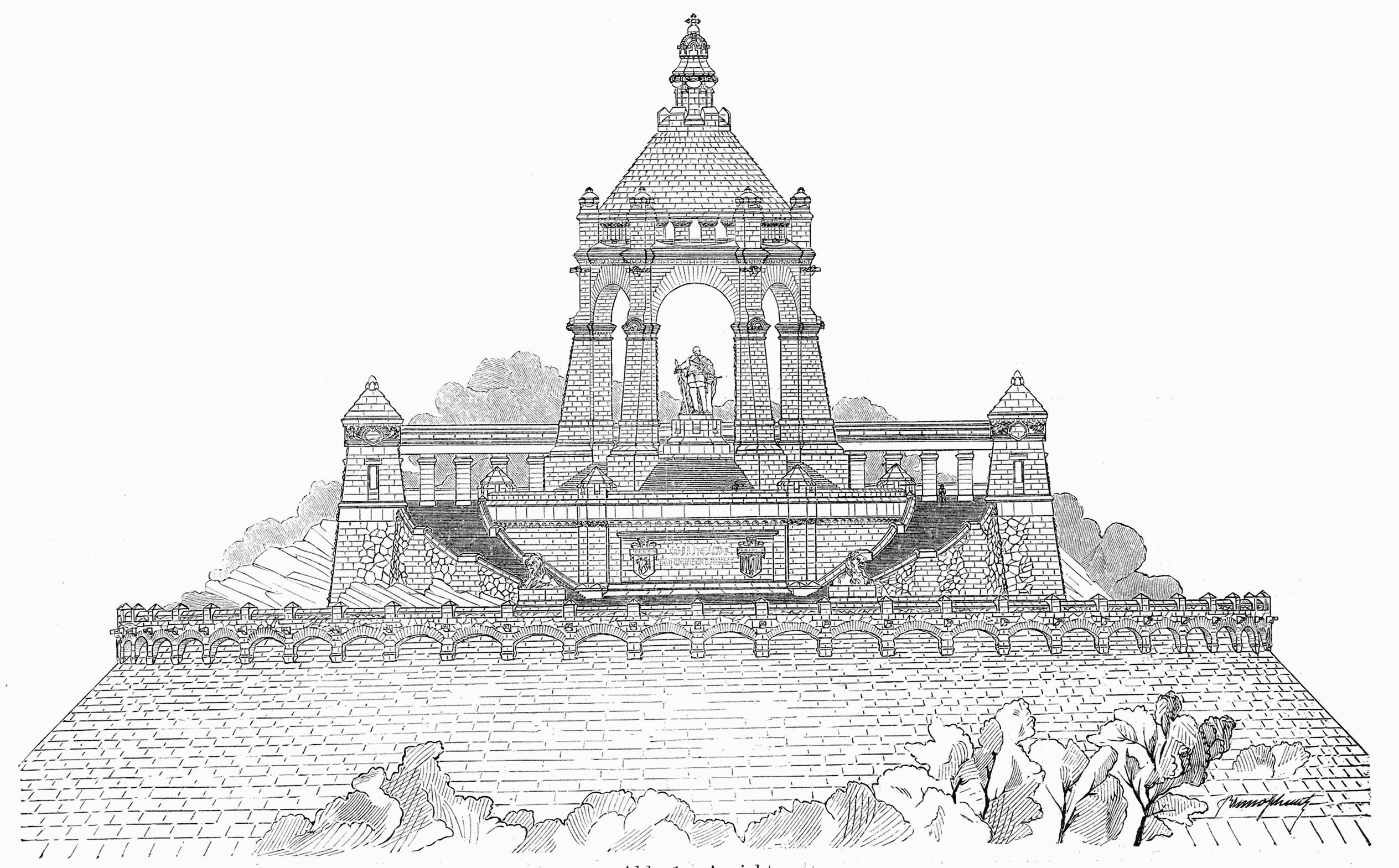
Schmitz's ca. 1890 rendering for the Kaiser Wilhelm Monument in Porta Westfalica.

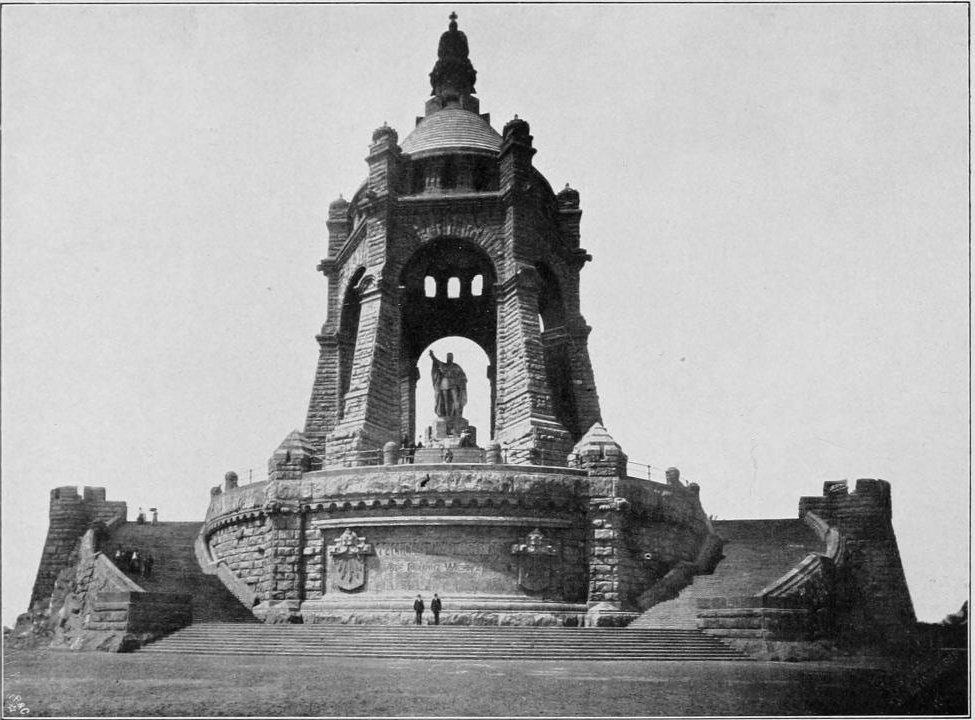
Kaiser Wilhelm Monument (1890–96), Teutoburg Forest, Porta Westfalica, Caspar von Zumbusch, sculptor.

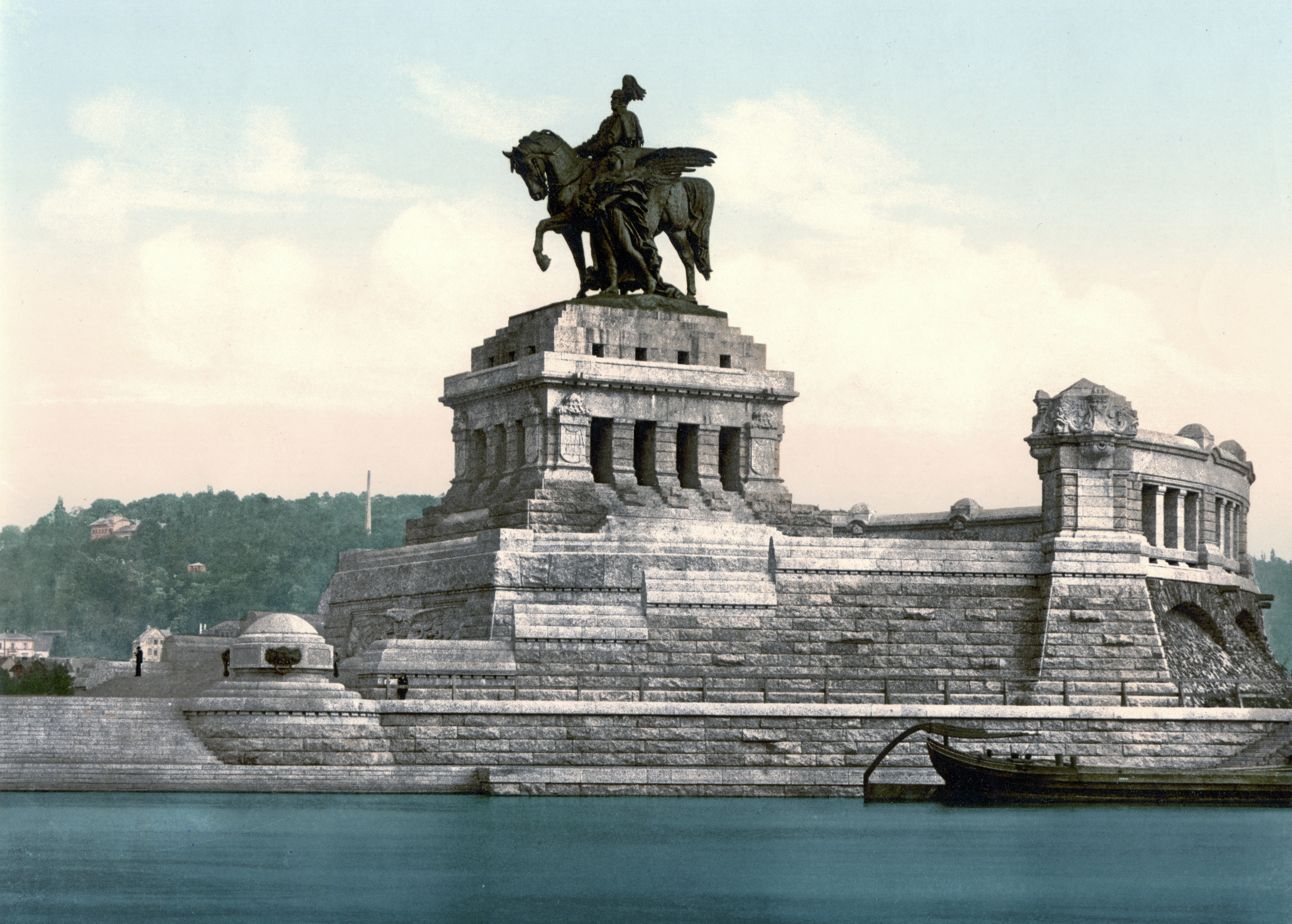
Deutsches Eck Monument (1894–97), Koblenz.

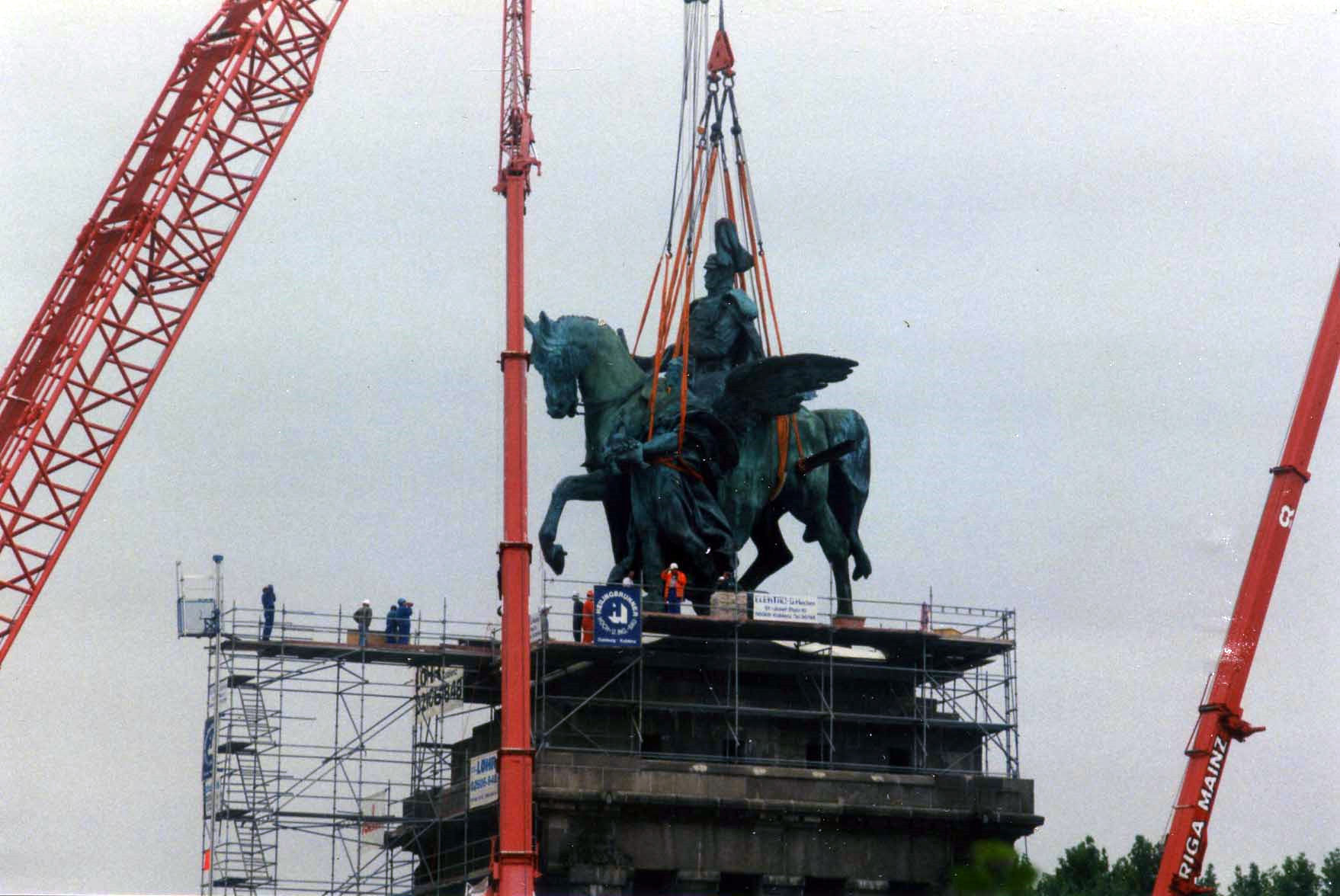
Emil Hundrieser's colossal Equestrian statue of Kaiser Wilhelm I atop the Deutsches Eck was severely damaged in World War II. A copy by Raymond Kittl was installed in 1993.

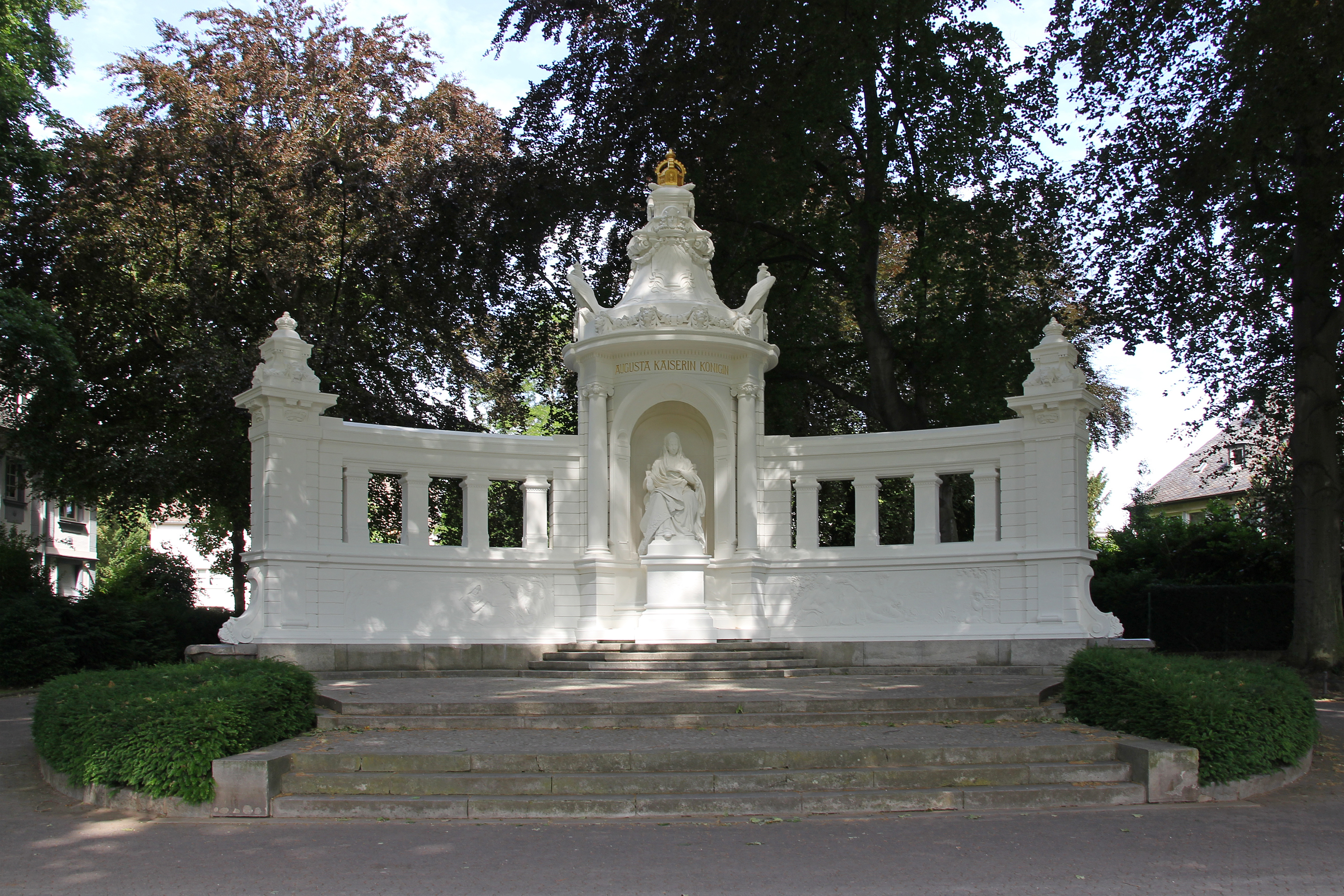
Kaiserin Augusta Monument (1896), Koblenz, Karl Friedrich Moest, sculptor.

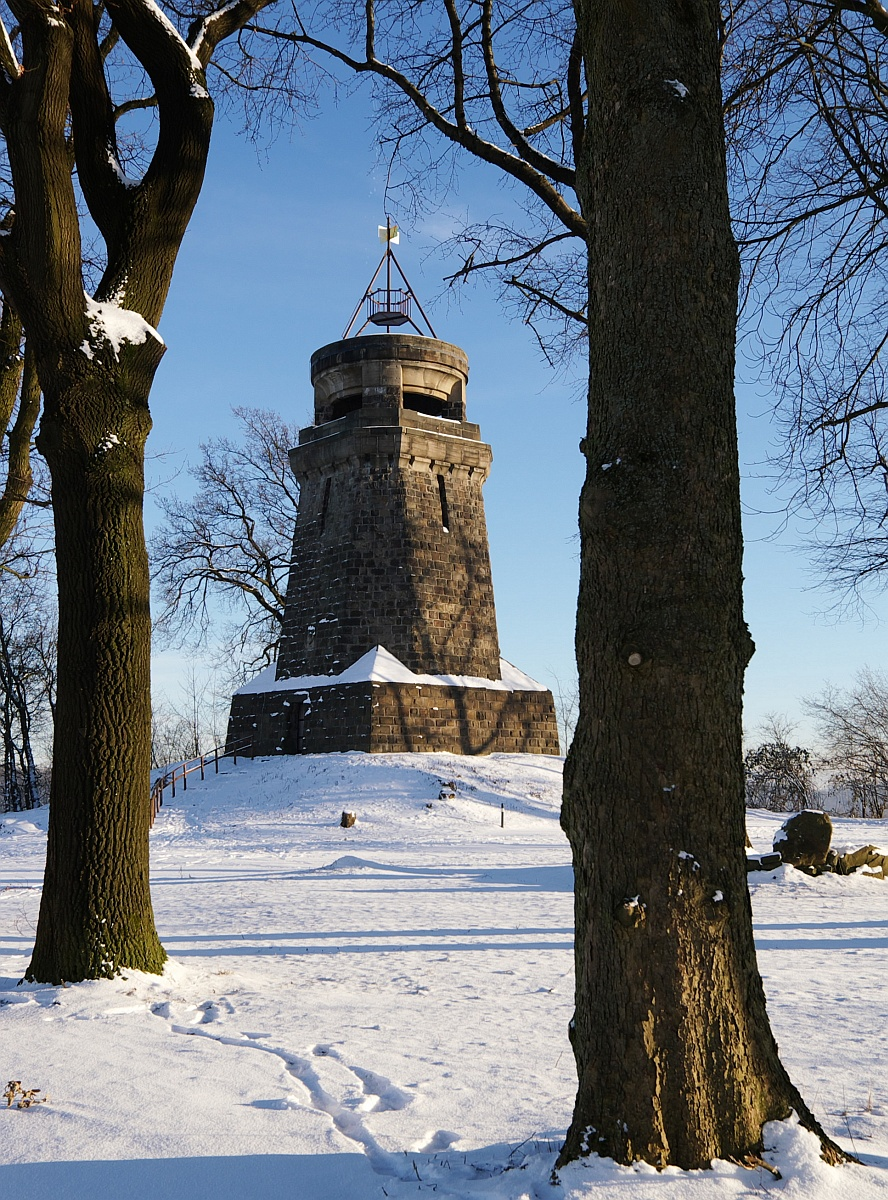
Bismarckturm (Bismark Tower) (1899–1900), Unna.

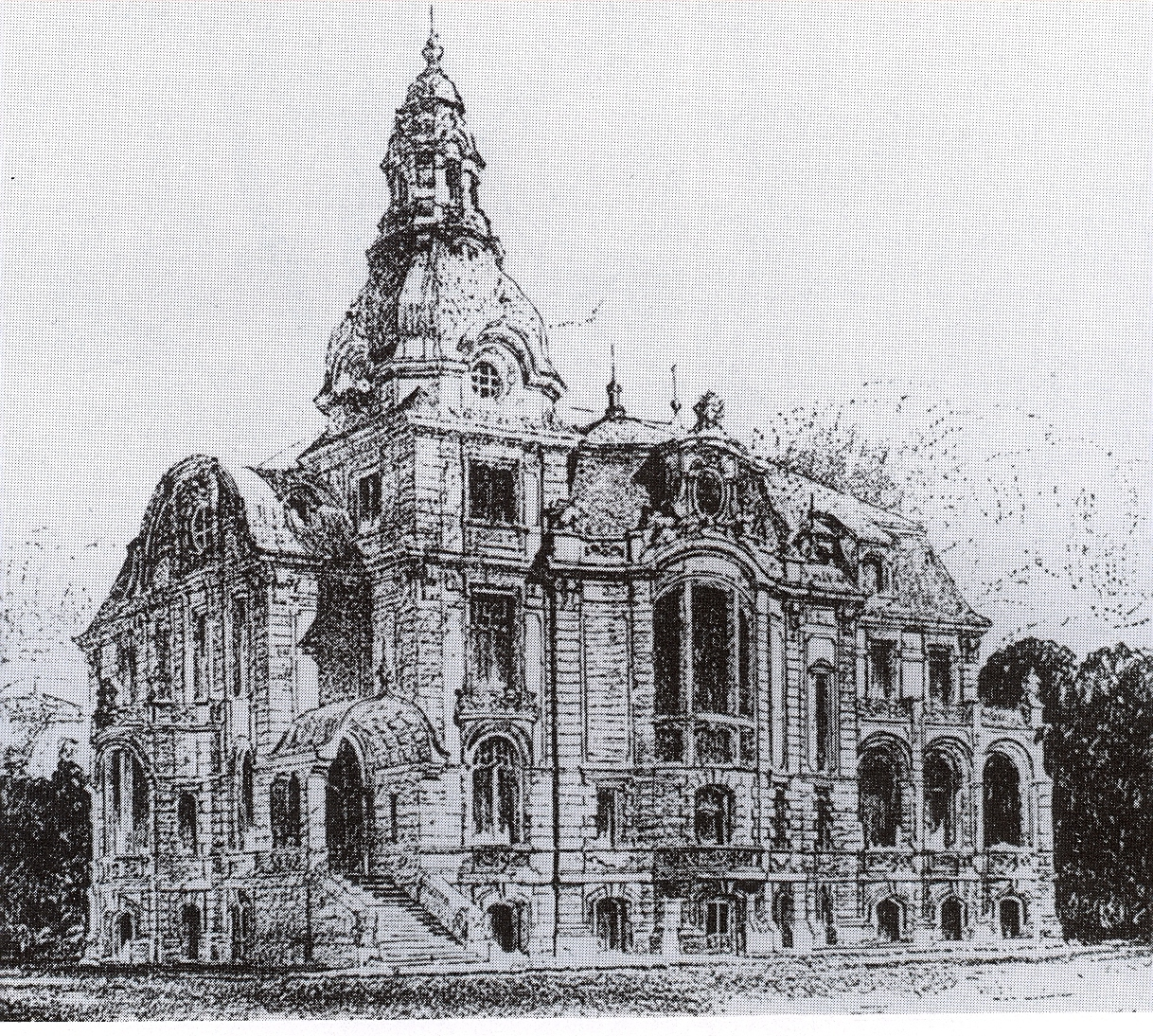
Schmitz's 1899 rendering for the Villa Stockwerk in Cologne.

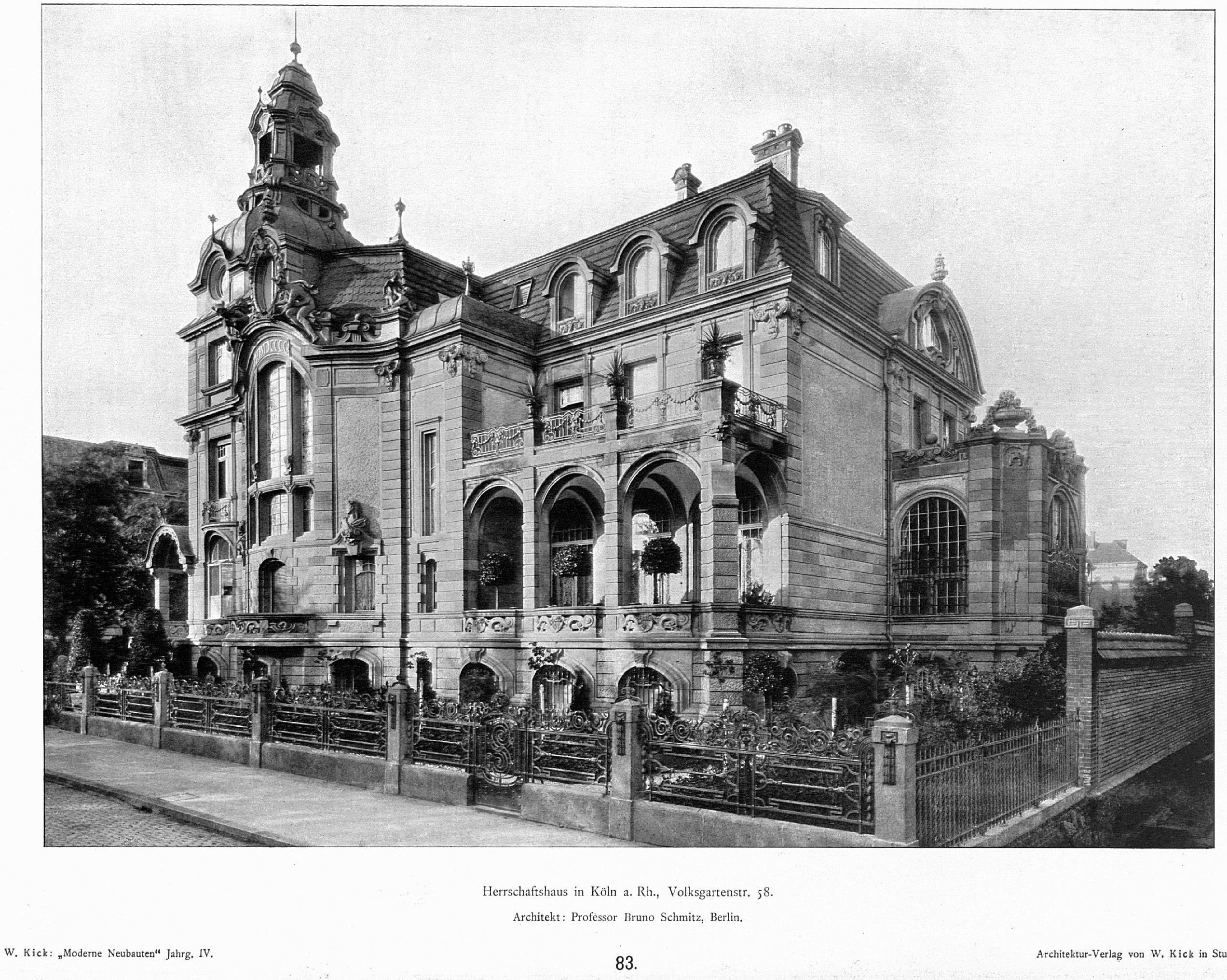
Villa Stockwerk (1899–1902), Cologne.

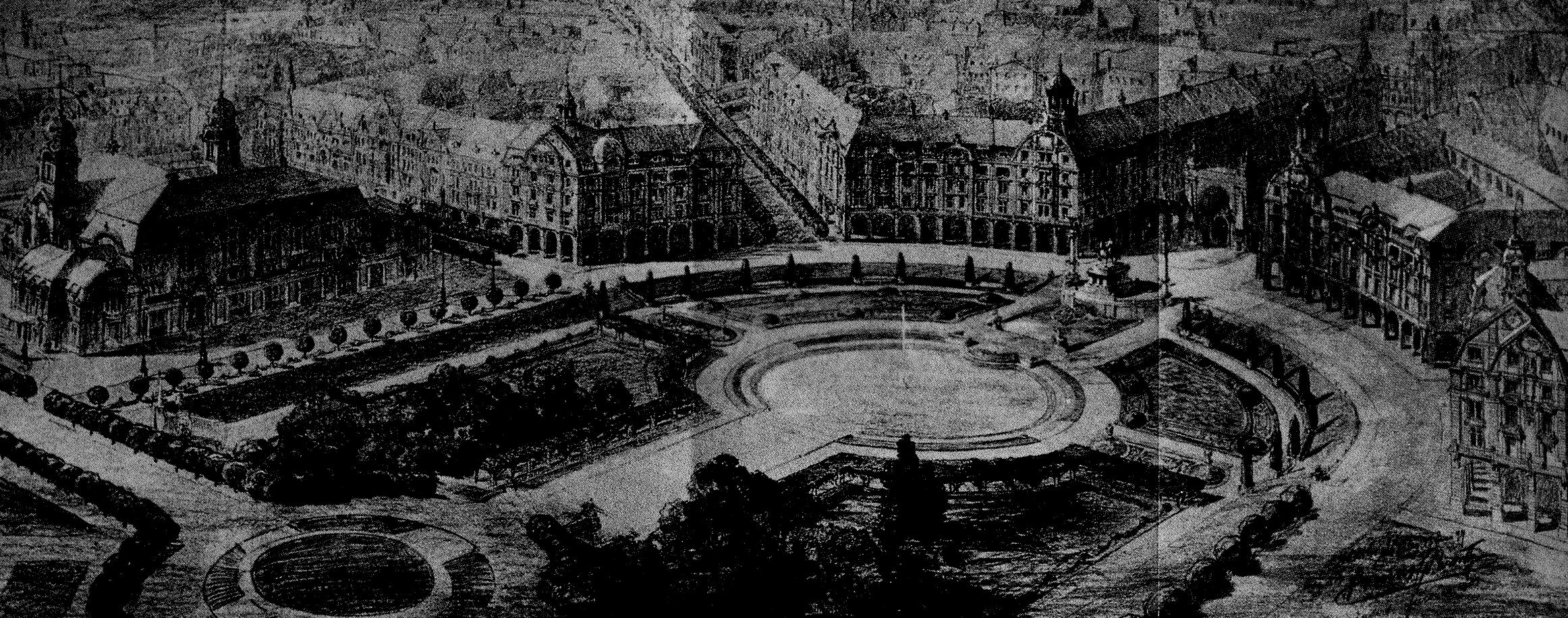
Schmitz's 1901 rendering of Friedrichsplatz, Mannheim.

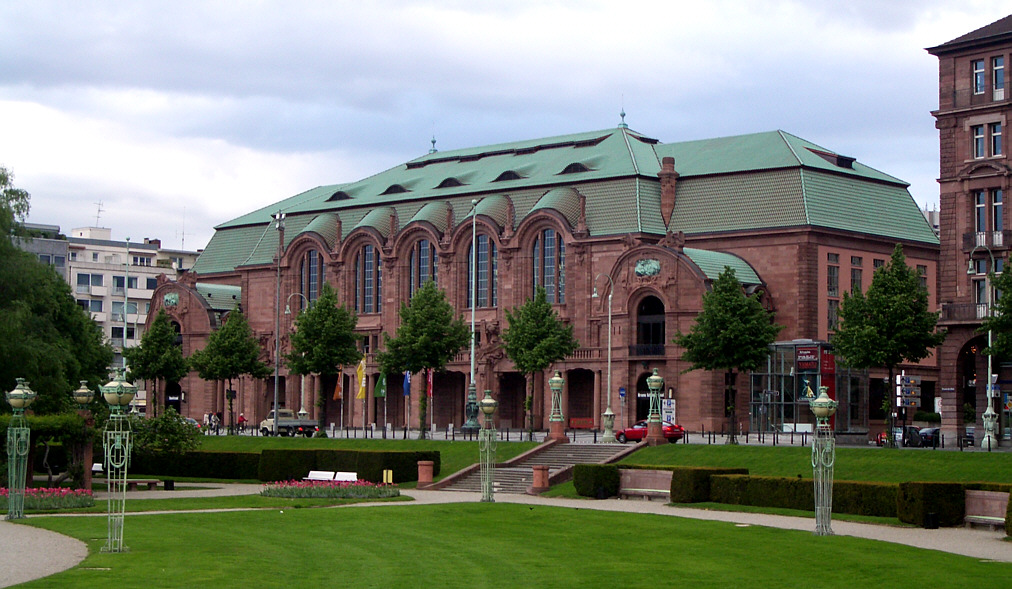
Rosengarten Concert Hall (1899–1903), Friedrichsplatz, Mannheim.

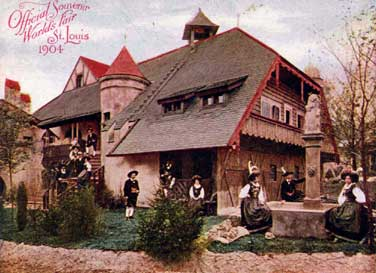
German Pavilion (1904), Saint Louis World's Fair, Saint Louis, Missouri.

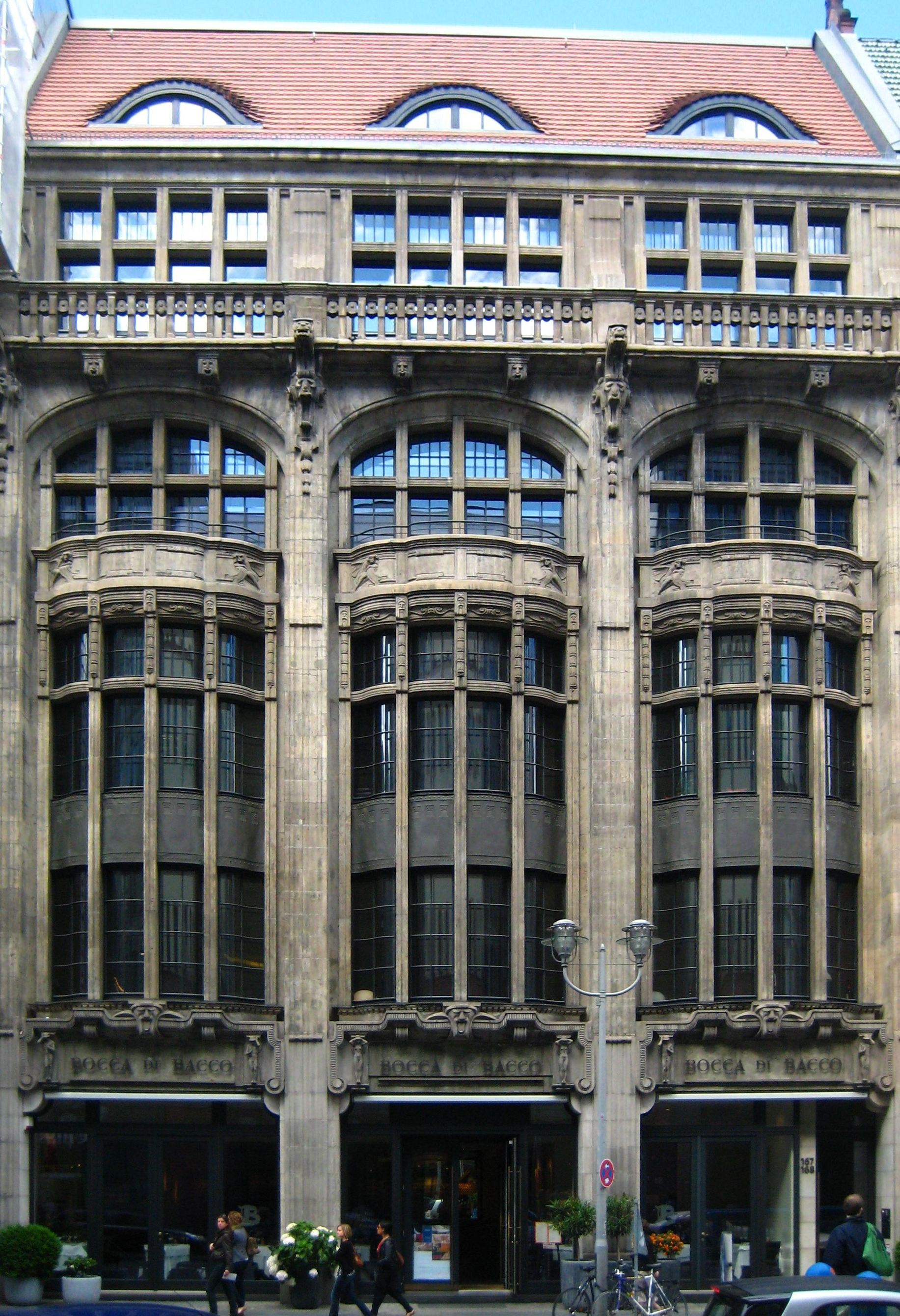
Automat Commercial Building (1904–05), Berlin.

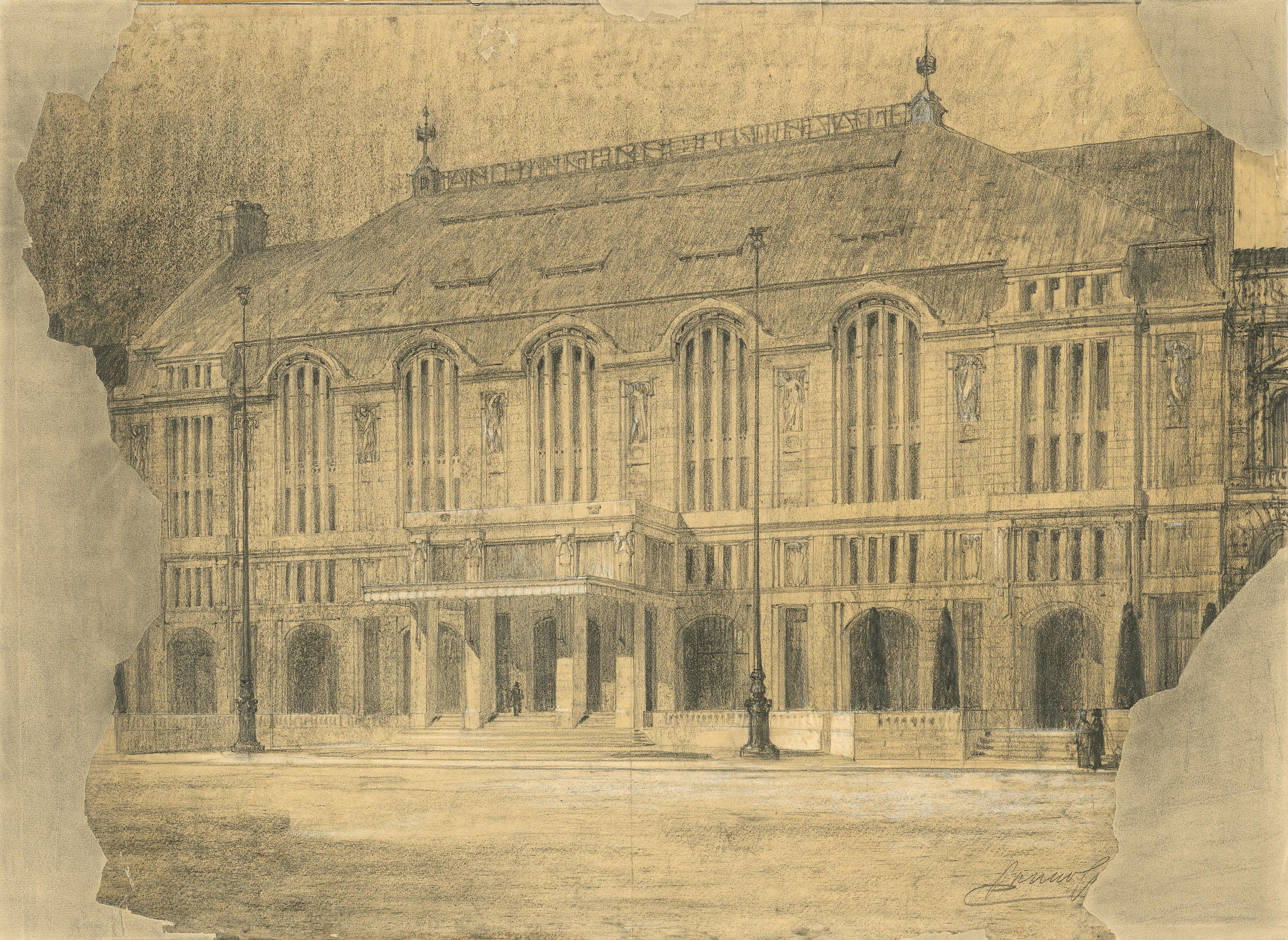
Schmitz's 1905 rendering for the Weinhaus Rheingold (Rheingold Wine House) in Berlin.

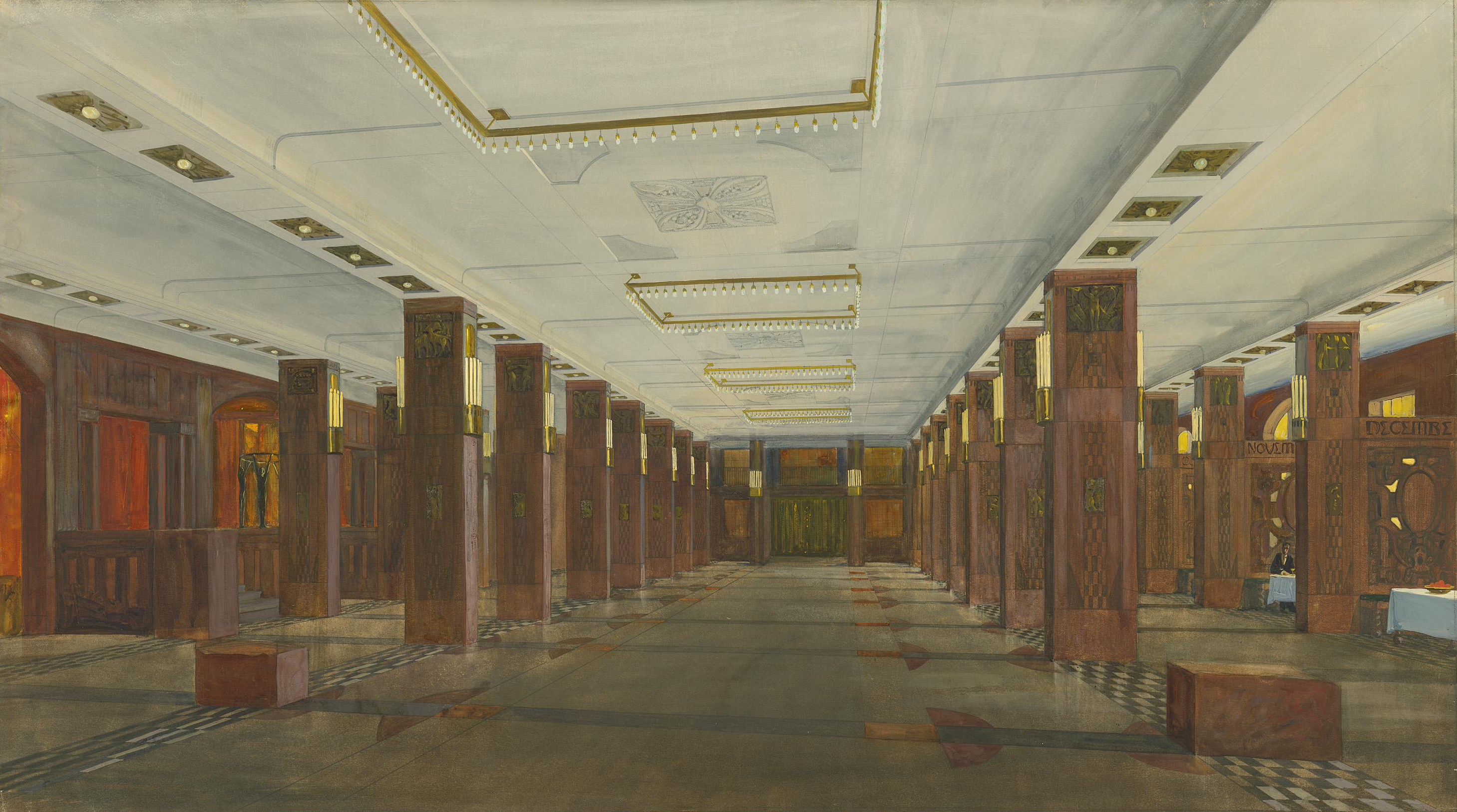
Weinhaus Rheingold (Rheingold Wine House) interior, 1906 (destroyed).

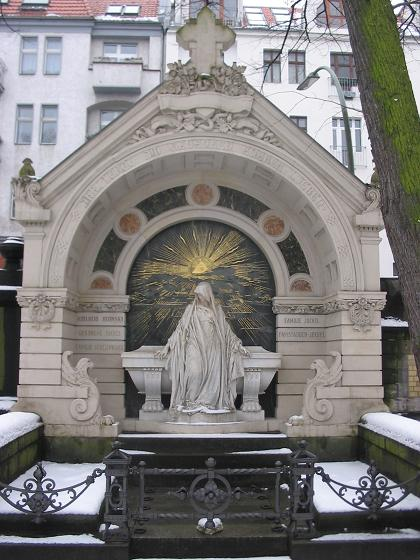
Carl Hoffmann Tomb, Old St. Matthew's Church, Berlin. Weeping Woman by Nikolaus Geiger.

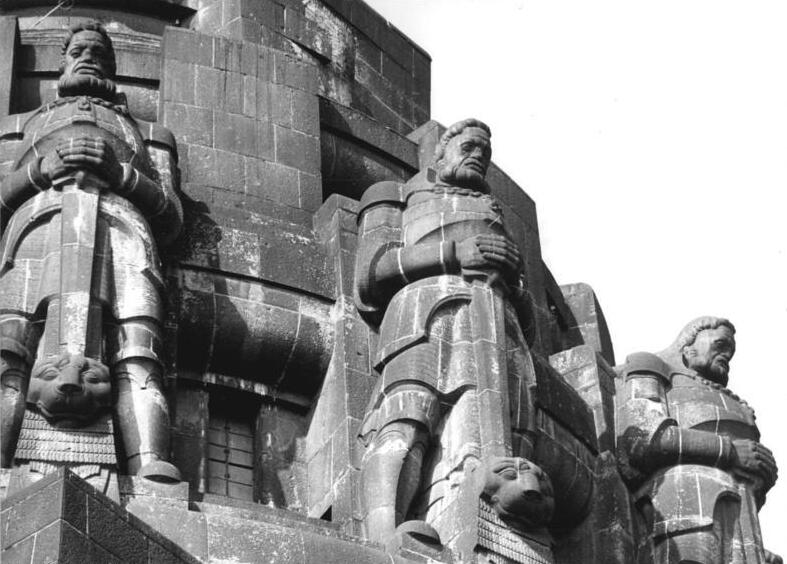
Wächterfiguren (Guards), by Franz Metzner, encircling the dome of the Völkerschlachtdenkmal.

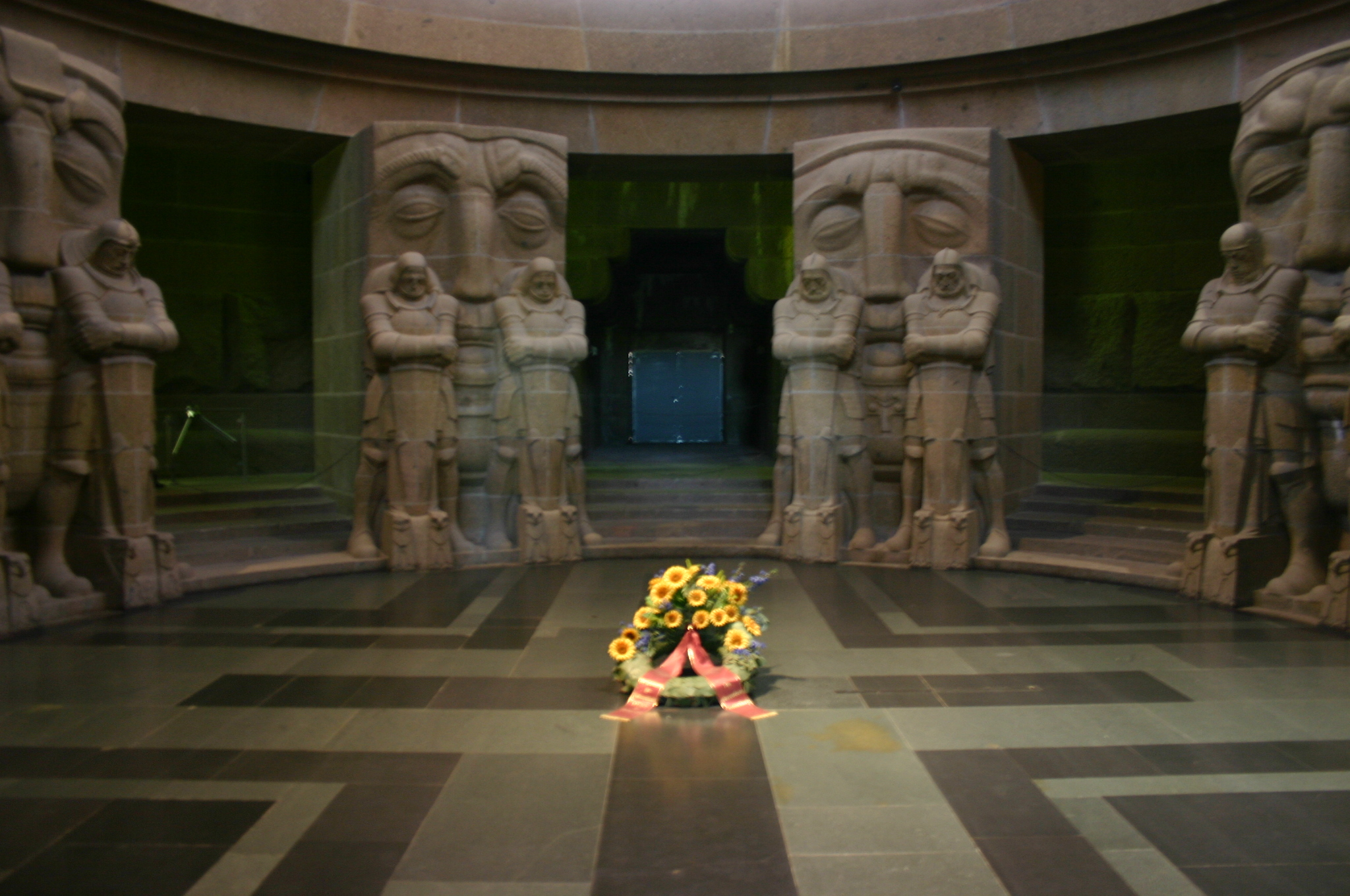
Masks of Fate, by Franz Metzner, crypt of the Völkerschlachtdenkmal.
