= Nikolaus Geiger =

German artist

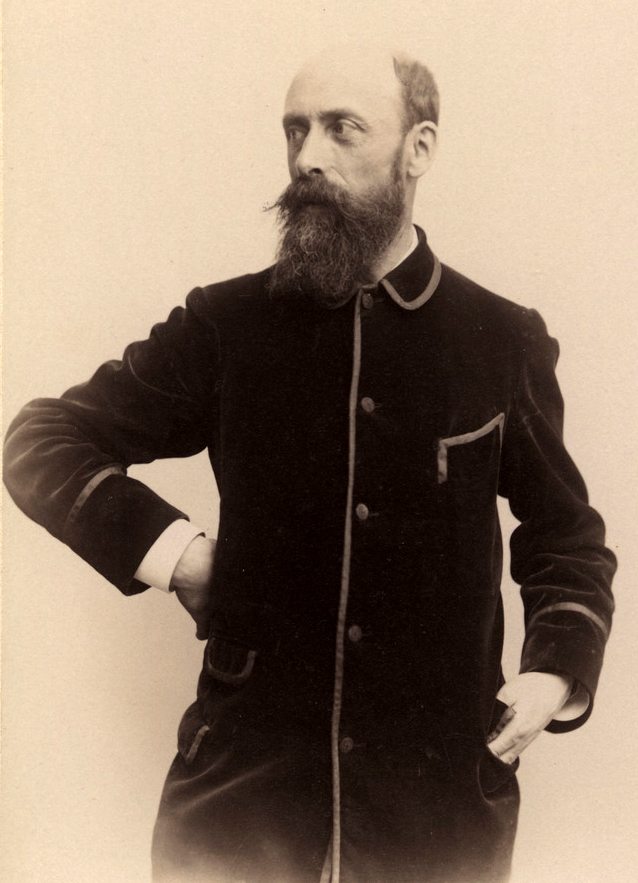
Nikolaus Geiger

Nikolaus Geiger (6 December 1849 – 27 November 1897) was a German sculptor and painter.

== Life ==
Born at Lauingen in the Kingdom of Bavaria, he began an apprenticeship as a stonemason. At the age of 16, he went to Munich, to study with Joseph Knabl at the Academy of Fine Arts. After the Franco-Prussian War and the unification of Germany in 1871, he moved to Berlin and after some time achieved recognition for his ornamental work in the Tiele-Winckler Palace. After a visit to Italy he again studied painting in Munich and in 1884 returned to Berlin, where he was awarded a gold medal in 1886, was elected member of the academy in 1893, and was made professor in 1896.

St. Hedwig's Cathedral in Berlin contains examples of his work. Geiger produced the high-relief Adoration of the Magi (1894). His The Communion of the Saints on the ceiling of St. Hedwig's is his most noteworthy painting. He sculpted Frederick Barbarossa for the Kyffhäuser Monument; a statue of Labor for the Reichsbank building in Berlin; and Centaur with Dancing Nymph for the National Gallery. He produced a tall relief frieze for the Soldiers' and Sailors' Monument in Indianapolis, Indiana.

Geiger died in Wilmersdorf (today part of Berlin), after suffering an internal bleeding.

== Sculptures ==
- Centaur with Dancing Nymph (before 1897), bronze, in the collection of the National Gallery (Berlin)
- Head of an Old Woman (before 1897), bronze, in the collection of National Gallery (Berlin)
- Head of a Young Girl (before 1897), bronze, in the collection of the National Gallery (Berlin)
- After the Fall from Grace" (1896), bronze, in the collection of the National Gallery (Berlin)
- Tall frieze The Army for the Soldiers' and Sailors' Monument in Indianapolis, Indiana.
- Tympanum of St. Hedwig's Cathedral, Berlin
- Numerous other works by Geiger were destroyed during World War II, including sculptures in "Villa Saloschin" (Berlin), the lifesize statue Labor for the Reichsbank in Berlin, and figural decorations in the building of the Dresdner Bank (Berlin).
- Kaiser Barbarossa (for the Kyffhäuser monument)
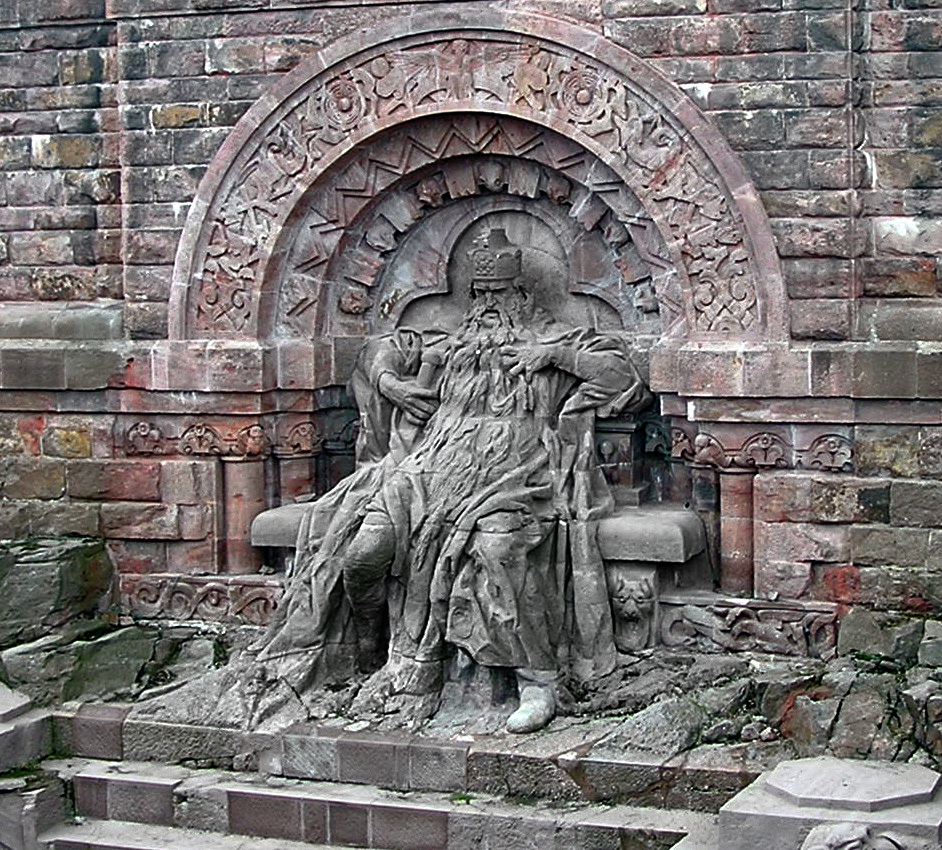
Barbarossa at the Kyffhäuser Monument

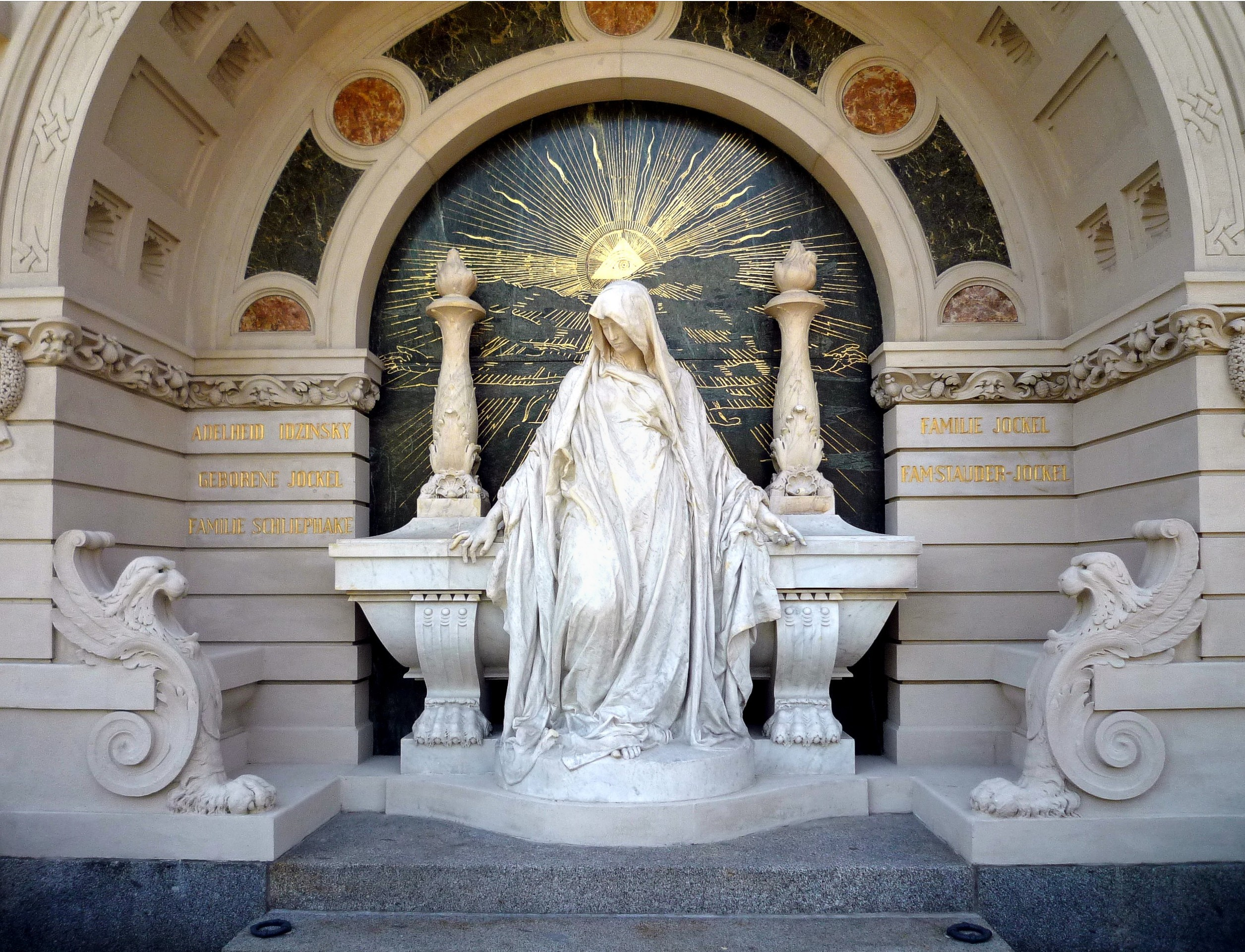
Weeping Woman, gravesite of Carl Hofmann at the Alter St.-Matthäus-Kirchhof Berlin, architect: Bruno Schmitz

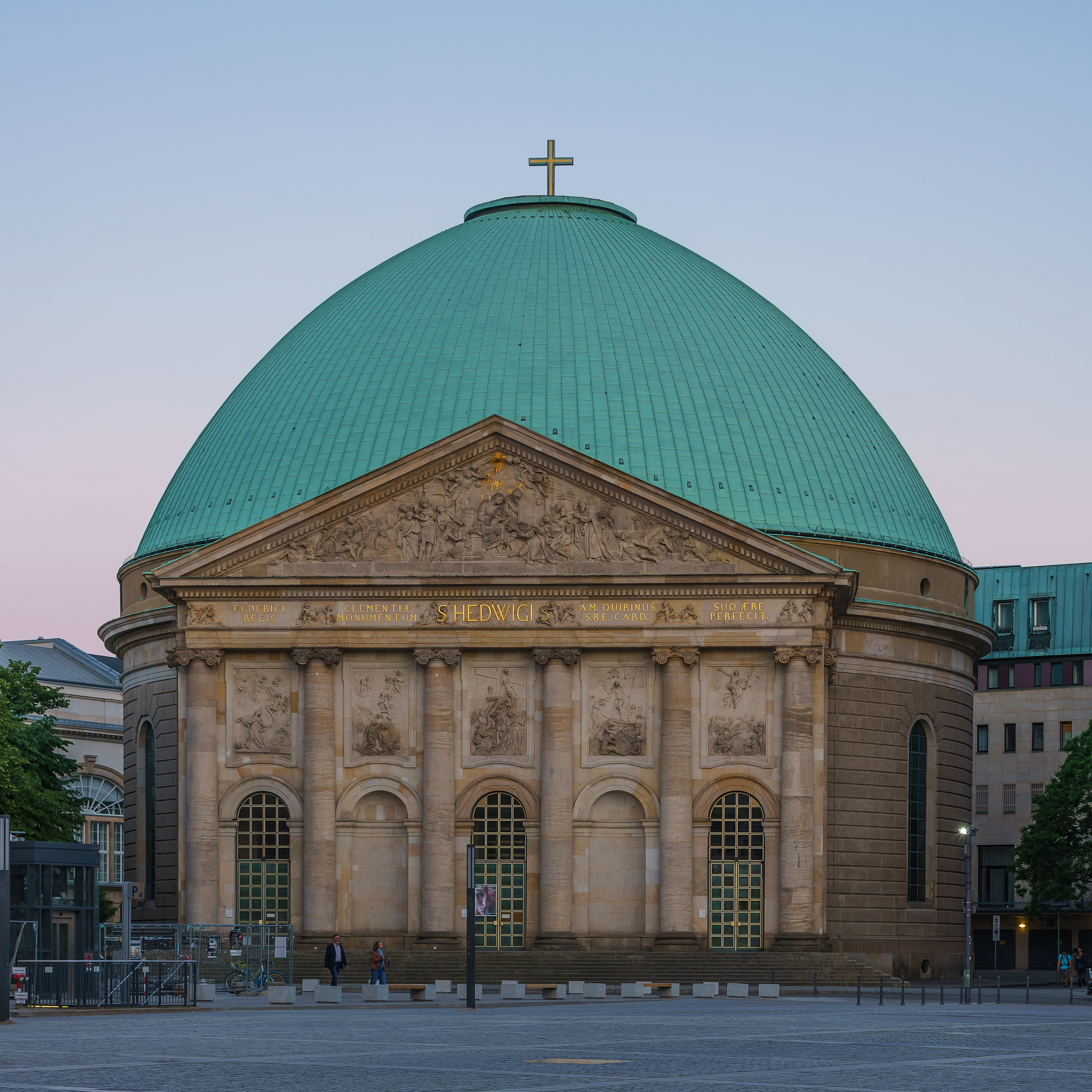
Tympanum frieze, St. Hedwig's Cathedral, Berlin

== Paintings ==
- The Sinner (1884), purchased in 1898 by the Alte Nationalgalerie Berlin
- Ceiling painting Adoration of the Christ Child in St. Hedwig's Cathedral Berlin

== See also ==
- List of German painters
