= Anthony Alofsin =

American architect (born 1949)

- Born: June 22, 1949 (age 76) Memphis, Tennessee, U.S.
- Occupation: Architect; artist; art historian; writer; professor
- Education: Memphis Academy of Art; Phillips Academy; Harvard College (BA); Harvard Graduate School of Design (MArch); Columbia University (PhD)

Anthony Alofsin (born June 22, 1949 in Memphis, Tennessee) is an American architect, artist, art historian, writer, and professor. Educated at Memphis Academy of Art and Phillips Academy, Andover, he received from Harvard College and the Harvard Graduate School of Design, respectively, a Bachelor of Arts (1971) and Master of Architecture (1981). From Columbia University, he obtained a Ph.D. in Art History and Archaeology (1987).

Alofsin has written books on modern architecture and published numerous essays on architecture, art, and culture that have appeared in a variety of journals and reviews including The Times Literary Supplement, the Burlington Magazine, the New Criterion, and American Art. He was named Roland Gommel Roessner Centennial Professor Emeritus in Architecture in 2020 in recognition of his scholarship and teaching over thirty-three years at the University of Texas at Austin where he founded and directed the Ph.D. program in architectural history.

In 2017 he began donating material to establish the Anthony Alofsin Archive at the University of Texas in Austin. The vast collection contains research materials, his teaching collection, and professional papers.

== Publications ==
His most recent book is Frank Lloyd Wright's Bogk House; A Bold Experiment, co-authored with Richard Cleary. He is the author of Wright and New York: the Making of America's Architect. The Journal of the Society of Architectural Historians described it “as an exciting story, a cultural drama about power and intrigue, featuring Wright’s ambiguous love/hate relationship with New York City." He wrote Dream Home, What You Need to Know Before You Buy, a guide for consumers buying a home in the suburbs. His Frank Lloyd Wright, Art Collector, is the first publication of Wright's unknown collection of German and Austrian art prints. His book When Buildings Speak: Architecture as Language in the Habsburg Empire and its Aftermath, 1867-1933 won the Vasari Award from the Dallas Museum of Art .; a German language edition was published by the Verlag Anton Pustet in 2011. He is editor of A Modernist Museum in Perspective: The East Building, National Gallery of Art. He is the author of The Struggle for Modernism: Architecture, Landscape Architecture, and City Planning at Harvard, the history of the Harvard Graduate School of Design from its beginnings through the 1960s.

Much of his scholarly writing has focused on issues of influence, how ideas are transmitted and transformed, on the concept of artistic transition as well as reception as an index of cultural and social meaning. He conducts a broad range of research activities including American modernism, Central European modern architecture, the history of ornament, the history of design education in architecture, landscape architecture, and city planning as well as ongoing research on Frank Lloyd Wright. He has written on the role of narrative in architecture and on the origins of regionalism in modern architecture.

== International recognition ==
Alofsin is internationally recognized as one of the world's leading authorities on the architecture of Frank Lloyd Wright and as an expert on modern architecture. In 2006, he received the Wright Spirit Award from the Frank Lloyd Wright Building Conservancy. The award honors an individual who, through artistic, architectural, scholarly, professional or other endeavors embodies the spirit of Frank Lloyd Wright. ' His pioneering study, Frank Lloyd Wright: the Lost Years, 1910-1922, is acknowledged to be one of the most important books on Wright in the last forty years; the book was a winner in the monograph category in the American Institute of Architects International Book Awards. Alofsin's other publications include the five-volume reference work, Frank Lloyd Wright: An Index to the Taliesin Correspondence, which won the Vasari Award of the Dallas Museum of Art.

Alofsin was ranked “Best of the Best” and in the 90th percentile of research professors, academics, and dons among an international evaluation of schools of architecture by the Key Centre for Architectural Sociology.

Alofsin has been named a Fellow of the Society of Architectural Historians, Fellow, Helen Riaboff Whiteley Center; Fellow, Bogliasco Foundation, Liguria Study Center for the Arts and Humanities; Ailsa Mellon Bruce Senior Fellow, Center for Advanced Studies in the Visual Arts, National Gallery of Art, Washington, D.C; Fellow, MacDowell Colony; Fellow, the Internationales Forschungszentrum Kulturwissenschaften, Vienna; Visiting Scholar, the Frank Lloyd Wright Foundation; Visiting Fellow, Harvard Graduate School of Design; and Fulbright Professor, Academy of Fine Arts Vienna. In 2015 Alofsin was the recipient of the Wilder Green Fellowship in Architecture, and in 2017 he was elected a Fellow of the American Institute of Architects, one of the highest honors given by the profession.

== Advice and practice ==
He has been active as a curator and adviser to several architectural exhibitions. He was consulting curator for the major retrospective Frank Lloyd Wright, Architect at the Museum of Modern Art in New York. He curated Prairie Skyscraper on Wright's Price Tower in Bartlesville, Oklahoma, and the exhibition Wright's Wasmuth Folios: Representing the Ideal, at the Ross Gallery, Columbia University.

Alofsin maintains an architectural practice and his projects, which range in scale and style, have been frequently published. The sites of his projects include New Mexico, New York, and Texas. He also lectures internationally.

== Books ==
- Alofsin, Anthony Wright's Bogk House: A Bold Experiment, Milwaukee: Burnham Block Foundation; distributed by Yale University Press, 2025.ISBN 9780300282375.
- Alofsin, Anthony Wright and New York: The Making of America's Architect, New Haven and London: Yale University Press, 2019.ISBN 9780300238853.
- Alofsin, Anthony Dream Home: What You Need to Know Before You Buy, Austin:InnerformsLtd.com, 2013. ISBN 978-0982063033.
- Alofsin, Anthony Frank Lloyd Wright, Art Collector, Austin: University of Texas Press, 2012. ISBN 978-0292737211
- Alofsin, Anthony Architektur beim Wort nehmen. Bildhaft sprechende Baukunst des Habsburgerreiches und seiner Nachfolgestaaten 1867-1933, Salzburg: Verlag Anton Pustet, 2011. ISBN 978-3-7025-0630-8.
- Alofsin, Anthony Halflife, A Fictive Memoir. Austin, TX: InnerformsLtd.com, 2009. ISBN 978-0-9820630-0-2.
- Alofsin, Anthony, editor and essayist, A Modernist Museum in Perspective: The East Building, National Gallery of Art (Studies in the History of Art Series). Editor and essayist. New Haven: Yale University Press and National Gallery of Art, 2009.
- Alofsin, Anthony, When Buildings Speak: Architecture As Language in the Habsburg Empire and Its Aftermath, 1867-1933, University of Chicago Press, Chicago and London 2006, ISBN 0-226-01506-8
- Alofsin, Anthony, editor/co-author Prairie skyscraper: Frank Lloyd Wright's Price Tower, Price Tower Arts Center, Bartlesville OK; Rizzoli, New York 2005, ISBN 0-8478-2754-2
- Alofsin, Anthony, The Struggle for Modernism: Architecture, Landscape Architecture, and City Planning at Harvard, W. W. Norton, New York and London 2002, ISBN 0-393-73048-4
- Alofsin, Anthony, editor, Frank Lloyd Wright: An Index to the Taliesin Correspondence, Garland Publishing, New York 1988 [five volumes]
- Alofsin, Anthony, editor, Frank Lloyd Wright: Europe and Beyond, University of California Press, Berkeley CA 1999, ISBN 0-520-21116-2
- Alofsin, Anthony, Frank Lloyd Wright--The Lost Years, 1910-1922: A Study of Influence, University of Chicago Press, Chicago 1993, ISBN 0-226-01366-9
