= Świdnicka Cellar =

Polish Restaurant Company based in Poland

Coordinates: 51.1095°N 17.0320°E

Świdnicka Cellar Piwnica Świdnicka
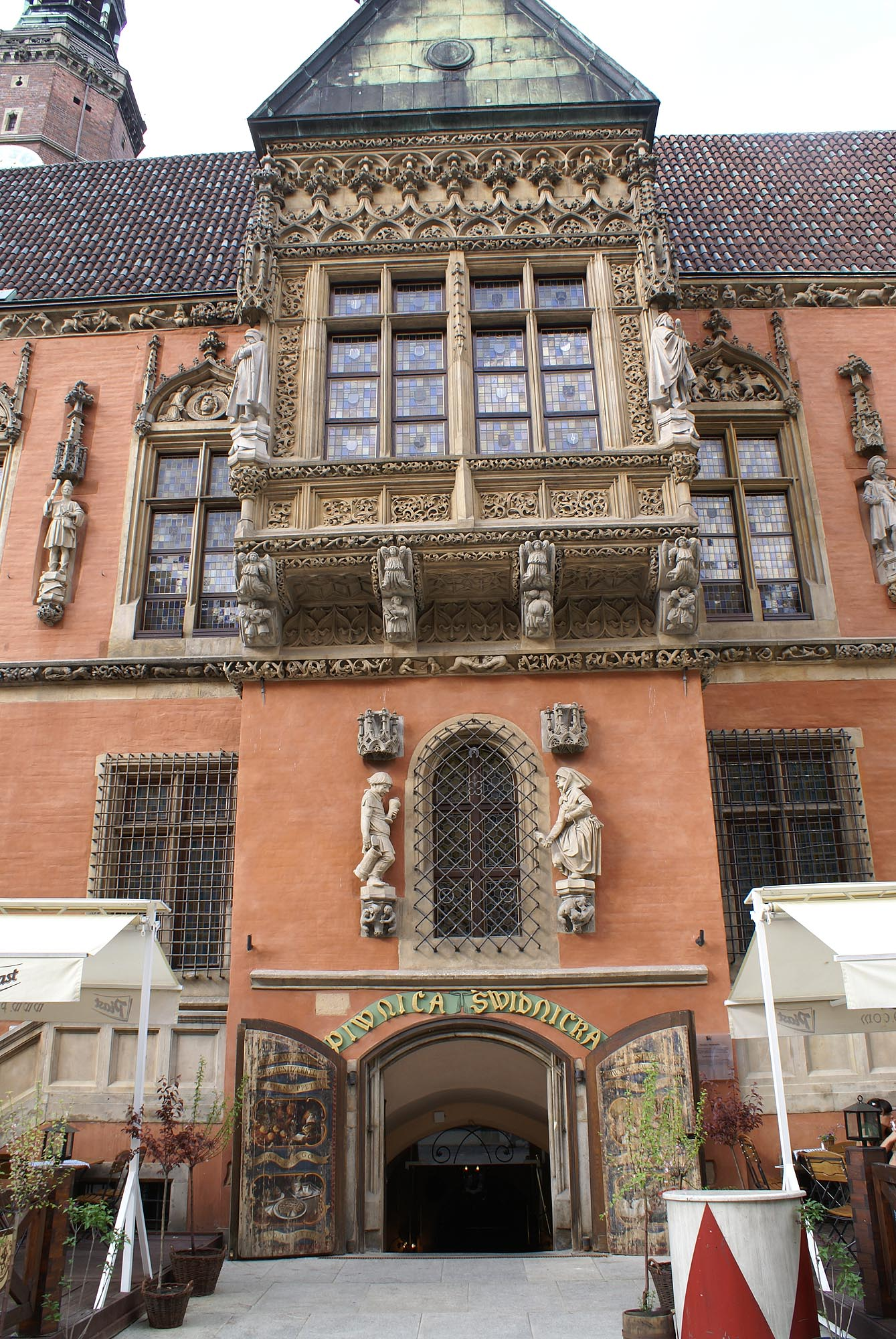
- South facade of the Old Town Hall with the entrance to the restaurant
- Industry: Restaurant
- Founded: 1273
- Headquarters: Rynek Ratusz 1, Wrocław, Poland

The Świdnicka Cellar (Polish: Piwnica Świdnicka, [pivˈɲit͡sa ɕfidˈɲit͡ska], German: Schweidnitzer Keller) is a restaurant based in the medieval cellars of the Old Town Hall in Wrocław, Poland. It was established in 1273, within medieval Poland.

The name comes from the nearby city of Świdnica, from which dark strong beer was delivered to the restaurant in the Middle Ages. Świdnica was a renowned brewing centre, and its beer was served in restaurants called "Świdnicka Cellars," which existed in large cities such as Kraków (Piwnica Świdnicka w Krakowie), Toruń, and Wrocław, the last of which still operates to this day.

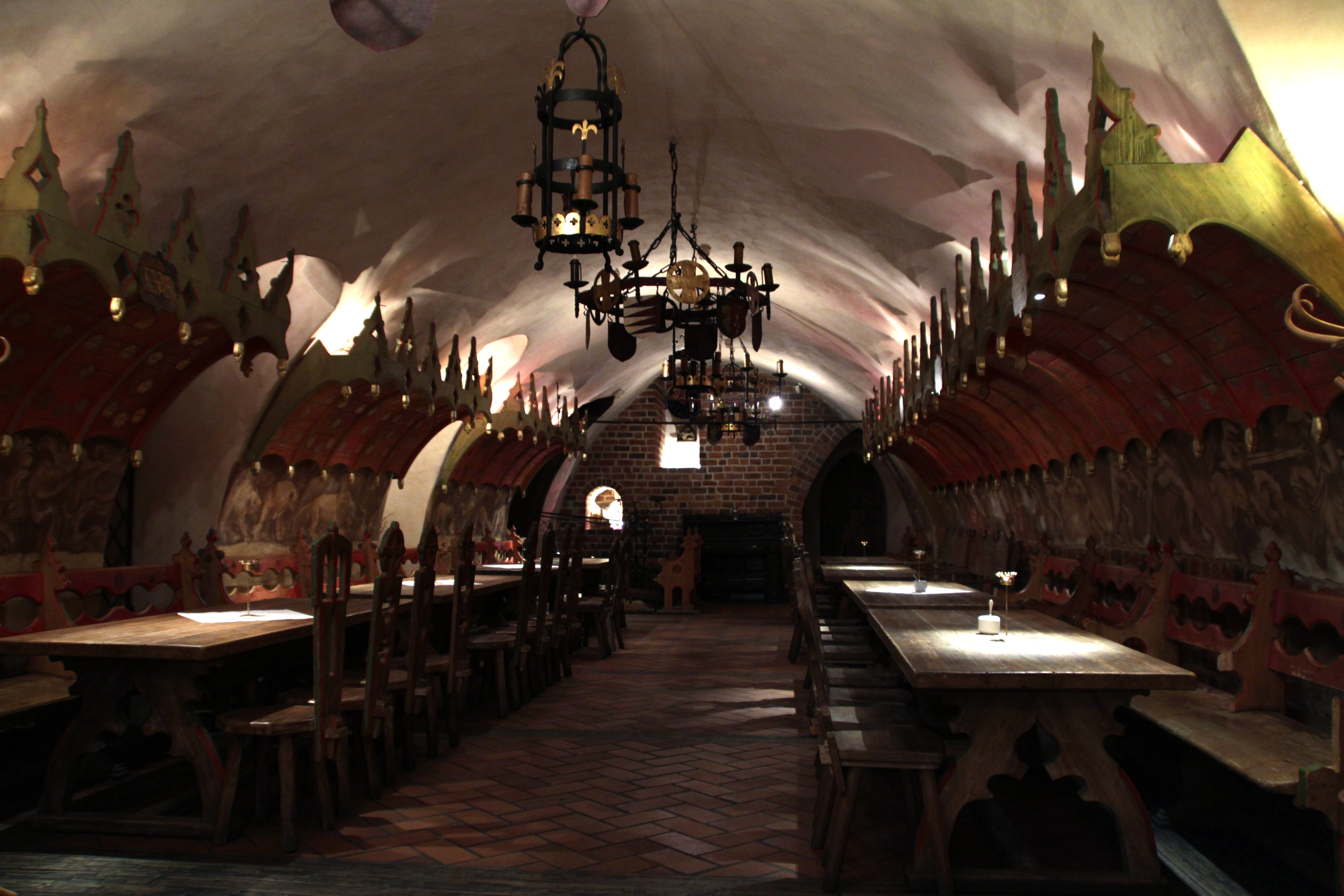
Interior

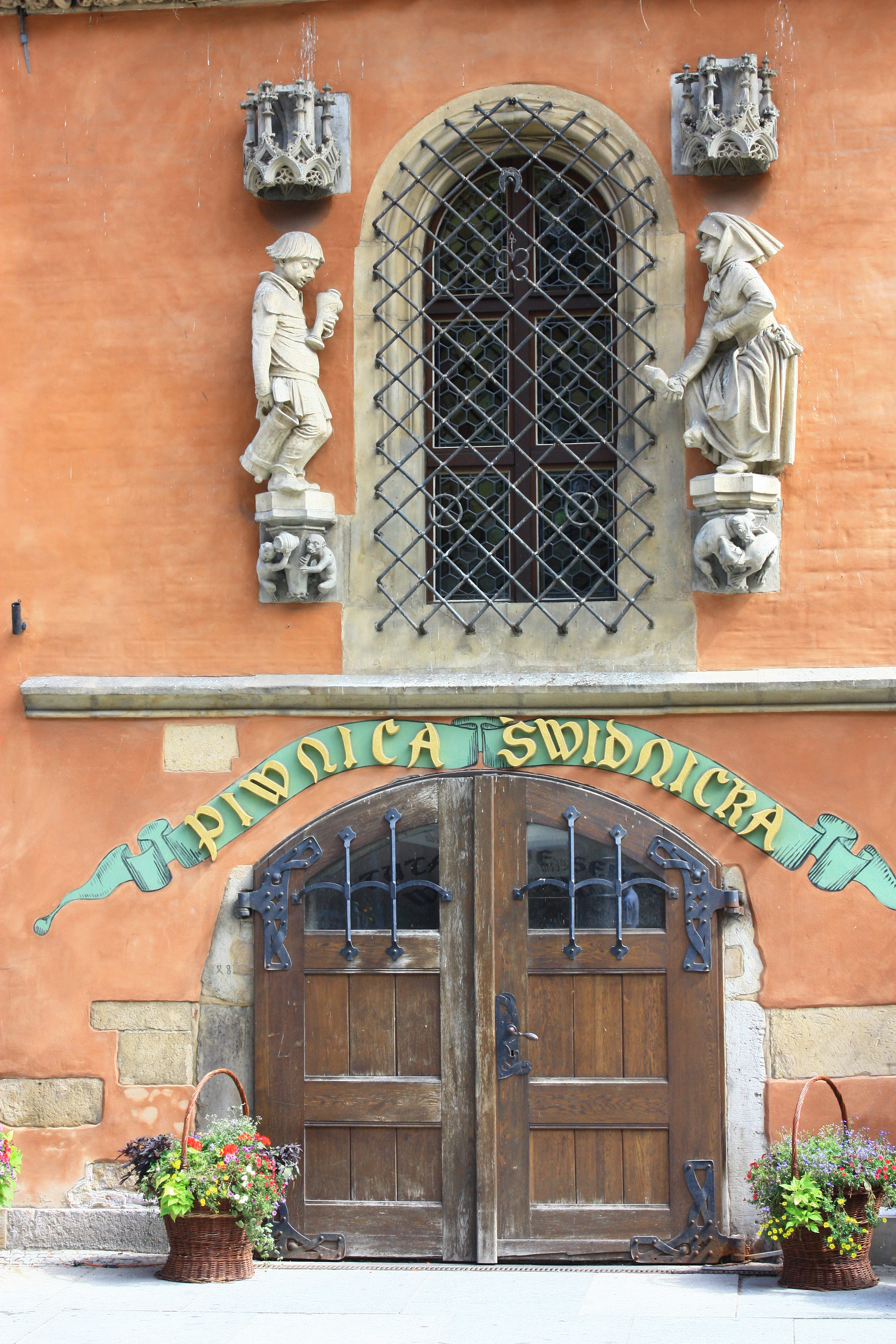
Entrance

Above the entrance to the Świdnicka Cellar there is a sculpture by Christian Behrens depicting a drunken reveler with a jug and a mug of beer and his furious wife with a shoe in her hand to punish him.

== Notable visitors ==
On the wall is a table with the names of notable visitors including:

- Sigismund, Holy Roman Emperor
- Gotthold Ephraim Lessing
- Joseph von Eichendorff
- Józef Wybicki
- August Heinrich Hoffmann von Fallersleben
- Johann Wolfgang von Goethe
- Frederic Chopin
- Ferdinand Lassalle
- Józef Ignacy Kraszewski
- Juliusz Słowacki
- Karl Eduard von Holtei
- Gustav Freytag
- Gerhart Hauptmann
- Otto Mueller
- Hans Poelzig
- Max Berg
- Oskar Moll
- Alfred Kerr
- Paul Löbe

== See also ==
- New City Hall, Wrocław
- List of oldest companies

== Bibliography ==
- Okólska, Halina; Papenbrock, Cornelia; Wołoszyn, Ewa, eds. (2002). Piwo we Wrocławiu: od średniowiecza po czasy współczesne: wystawa, październik 2002. Wrocław: Muzeum Miejskie. ISBN 978-83-917909-0-8.
