= New City Hall, Wrocław =

- Nowy Ratusz we Wrocławiu
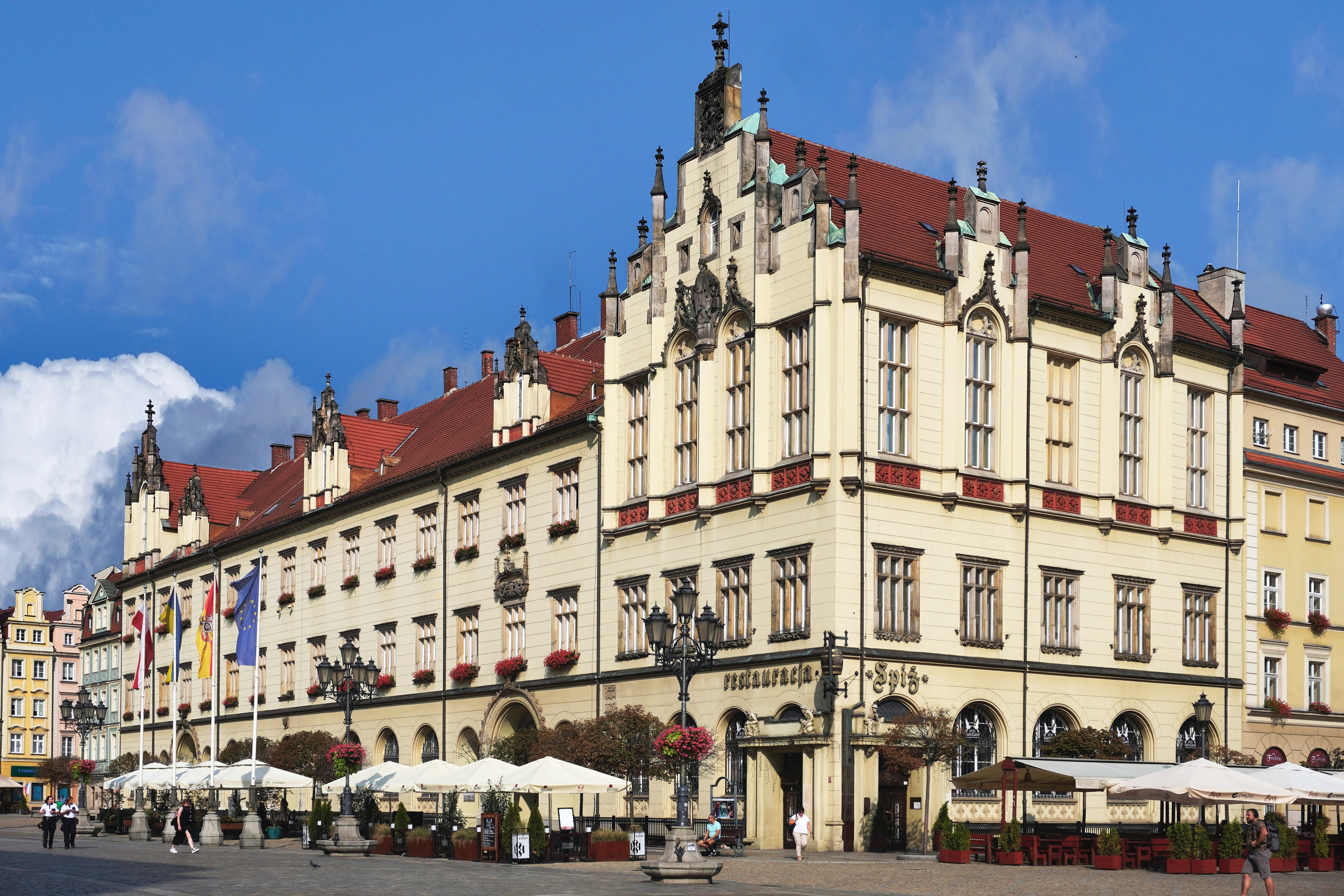
- New City Hall, view from the southwest

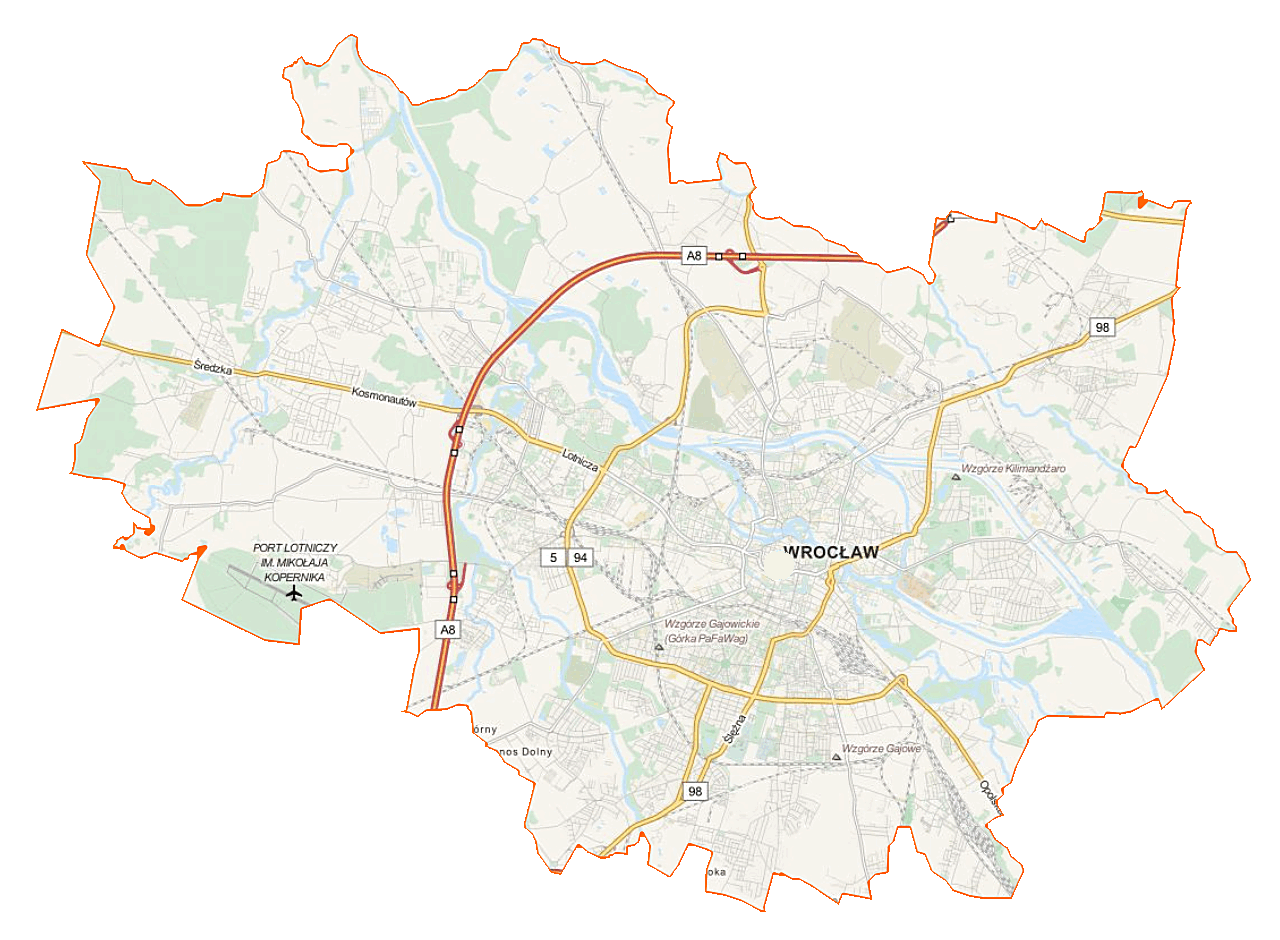
- Location within Wrocław New City Hall, Wrocław (Poland)

General information
- Location: ul. Sukiennice 9 / Rynek Ratusz 3/6, Wrocław, Poland
- Coordinates: 51°6′36.15″N 17°1′53.29″E

The New City Hall of Wrocław, Poland, is in the central block of the Wrocław Market Square. It was built between 1860 and 1864 according to the design of Friedrich August Stüler. It is the seat of the mayor and City Council of Wrocław, and since 1992 its basement has housed the Spiż Brewpub.

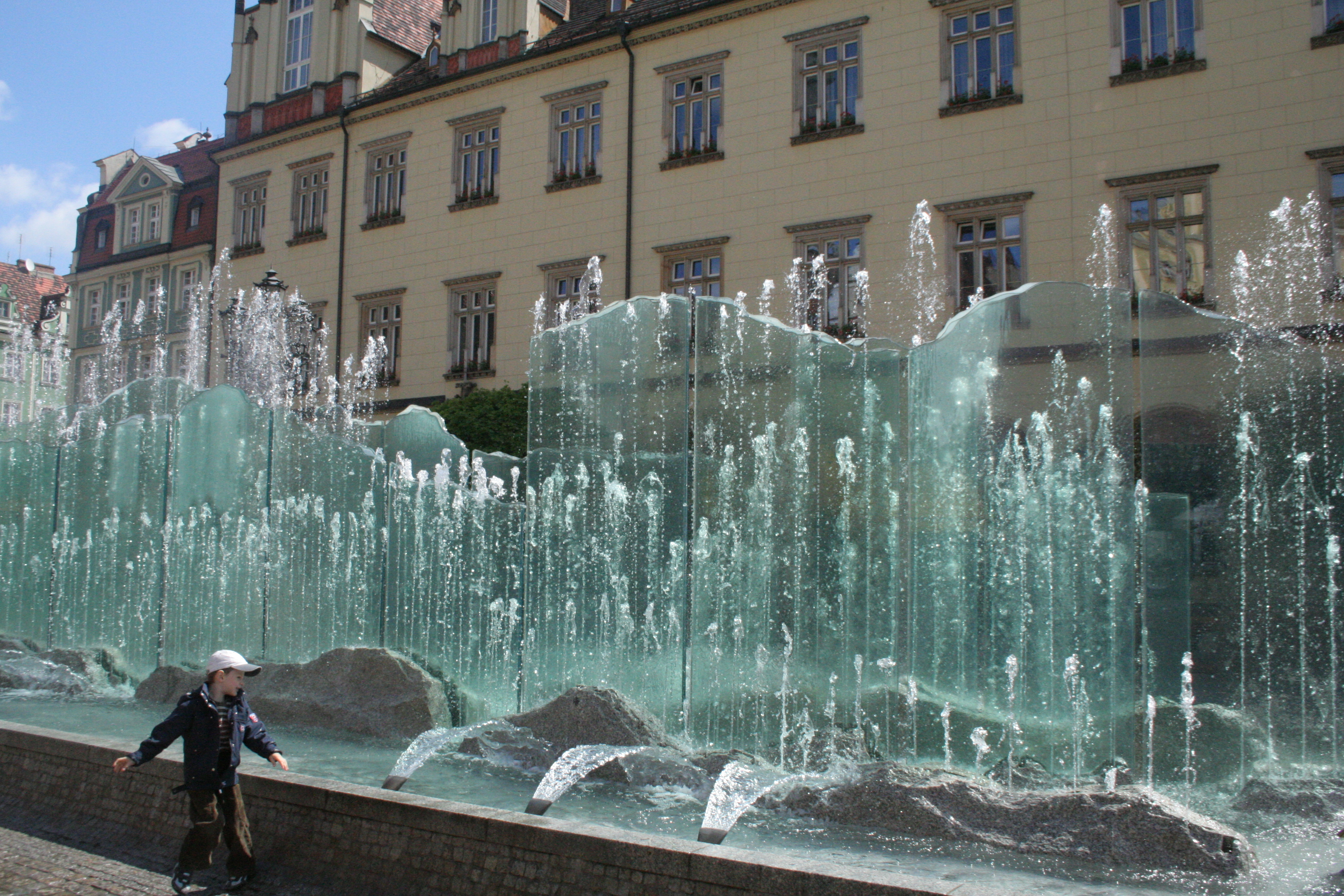
Fountain in Front of the New City Hall

== History ==
=== Reasons for construction ===
In the mid-19th century, as Wrocław developed, the demand for municipal administration space increased. The Old City Hall did not provide enough room and had been divided somewhat haphazardly into numerous office spaces, which were of inadequate quality for the city's needs. The building also required urgent renovations, and there was a lack of space for the expanding municipal archive.

The City Council itself was forced to hold meetings in temporary locations:

- Since 1808, in St. Mary Magdalene Gymnasium,
- Since 1817, in the Berlin House at Świdnicka Street (then No. 51),
- Since 1840, in the St. Elisabeth Gymnasium building.

=== Designs ===
The search for a more suitable building for the municipal administration focused, starting in 1857, on the western side of the central block (Trett) near the Old City Hall, which occupies the southern part of the block. At that time, the House of Linen Merchants (or Leinwandhaus in German), a former trading hall, was located in the southwestern part of the Trett. With the abolition of trade privileges, the building had lost its importance.

This structure had early modern origins, featuring a blend of Renaissance and late Gothic elements on its façade. However, its Fountain in Front of the New City Hall did not meet the city's administrative needs. Initially, plans were considered to add a fourth floor with a City Council meeting hall. A suitable design was prepared by the municipal building councilor, Julius von Roux. However, a technical inspection of the building's condition yielded negative results, leading to the abandonment of the idea.

The plot of the House of Linen Merchants was considered the ideal location, especially since it had a large square in front of it, which had a direct connection to the Prussian kings' castle. It was therefore decided to demolish the House of Linen Merchants and commission a new design that would fully meet the requirements of a modern town hall. The task was assigned to the renowned Berlin architect Friedrich August Stüler, who had previously expanded the Royal Palace in Wrocław several years earlier.

The first preliminary project was created in October 1858 and envisioned a building façade combining Neo-Gothic and Neo-Renaissance styles, with the latter dominating. The architect referred to the style of the building to be demolished, but gave the new design more monumental forms. In the southwestern corner of the block, Stüler designed the City Council hall on the third floor.

At that time, it was possible to enlarge the plot by additionally purchasing the Hop Office (Hopfenamtshaus) and the building adjacent to the House of Linen Merchants on the northern side. The revised project from late 1859 focused on late Gothic forms.

The new building was intended to serve several functions: a gastronomic space in the basement (similar to the Świdnicka Cellar in the old City Hall), commercial use on the ground floor, and administrative offices on the upper floors. The first floor was to house the library and archive, while the second would accommodate offices and the City Council hall. The corner part of the building housing the council hall was given a prominent stepped gable.

=== Construction ===
The House of Linen Merchants was closed on June 24, 1859. The demolition began on November 26 of the same year and was completed during the following winter. However, a relatively detailed drawing inventory of the building was made before the demolition, and several photographs were taken by photographer C. G. Werner. Some of the valuable architectural details were also preserved for later reuse.

By February 1860, the detailed design for the New City Hall was ready, and construction work commenced soon after. Two years later, the southern part of the building was completed and put into use on July 13, 1862. The northern part of the City Hall was finally finished on May 31, 1864. The long construction time was likely due to the decision made after the project had already started to purchase another building and extend the City Hall. However, it was not possible to acquire the last corner building, which now stands out in the New City Hall's dominant façade.

=== Later renovations ===
Numerous adaptations were made to the interior of the building in the 19th and 20th centuries. From 1889 to 1894, based on a design by Richard Plüddemann, with the collaboration of Karl Klimm and J. Nathanson, the interiors were significantly altered. Originally, the single open space on the first floor was divided by walls and repurposed for office use, as the archive was moved to the new building, now the University Library. Additionally, the building adjacent to the southeast of the New City Hall was raised and connected to the City Hall. The added floor in this building housed a gallery for the City Council hall. However, plans to alter the building's façade were abandoned.

In the 1920s, city builder Max Berg proposed demolishing the New City Hall and the remaining part of the central block (excluding the Old City Hall) to build a skyscraper for the city's administration.

More recently, in the 1990s, the building underwent extensive renovation, and the gastronomic function was restored in the basement, now the location of the Spiż Brewery. A glass fountain was added in front of the western façade, designed by Alojzy Gryt, and four flagpoles were erected.

== Architecture ==
The New City Hall is a three-story building, with a basement and a gabled roof, built in the historicist style. It is constructed with brick, plastered, and features sandstone and granite details on the façade. The roof is covered with ceramic tiles. The building's length is 76 meters, with a height of 16.60 meters to the cornice, and 19.30 meters at the corner section.

The building consists of a long wing running along the north-south direction, with a taller corner section whose roof is oriented east-west. Three gateway passages cross under the building, leading to the streets: Sukiennice, Przejście Garncarskie, and Żelaźnicze. The passage to Sukiennice is given a more elaborate architectural treatment; it is three-naved, with vaults resting on columns with granite shafts. The main entrance to the building is located on the north wall of this passage. Above the passage and on the single-arched façade along Sukiennice Street, there are spolia from the House of Linen Merchants.

The ground floor is separated from the upper floors by a cornice. The windows have full arches, and the window niches extend to the level of the surrounding pavement, while the basement is illuminated by light wells. The windows on the first and second floors are three-part, with stonework that mirrors the late Gothic window surrounds on the first floor of the House of Linen Merchants. In the corner section, four windows on the western side and five windows on the southern side on the second floor are part of the City Council hall.

On the western side, there is a tall stepped gable adorned with finials and an allegory of trade, while the southern side is embellished with two single-arched gables. Three smaller gables and one larger, two-arched gable accentuate the roof cornice of the long western wing.

== Bibliography ==
- Jolanta Gromadzka, Ewa Szewczyk, Nowy Ratusz we Wrocławiu (w:) Jerzy Rozpędowski (red.), Architektura Wrocławia. Tom 4. Gmach, Wrocław, Oficyna Wydawnicza Politechniki Wrocławskiej, 1998, ISBN 83-7085-393-5, str. 121–134
- Agnieszka Gryglewska, Architektura Wrocławia XIX-XX wieku w twórczości Richarda Plüddemanna, Oficyna Wydawnicza PWr, Wrocław 1999, ISBN 83-7085-386-2, str. 199–200
- Rudolf Stein, Der Große Ring zu Breslau, Wrocław 1935, str. 257–258
- Agnieszka Zabłocka-Kos, Dawny Dom Miejski (Stadthaus) zwany Nowym Ratuszem (...) (w:) Jan Harasimowicz (red.), Atlas architektury Wrocławia. Tom I. Budowle sakralne, Świeckie budowle publiczne, Wrocław, Wydawnictwo Dolnośląskie, 1997 ISBN 83-7023-592-1, str. 114–115
