= Christian Behrens =

German sculptor (1852–1905)

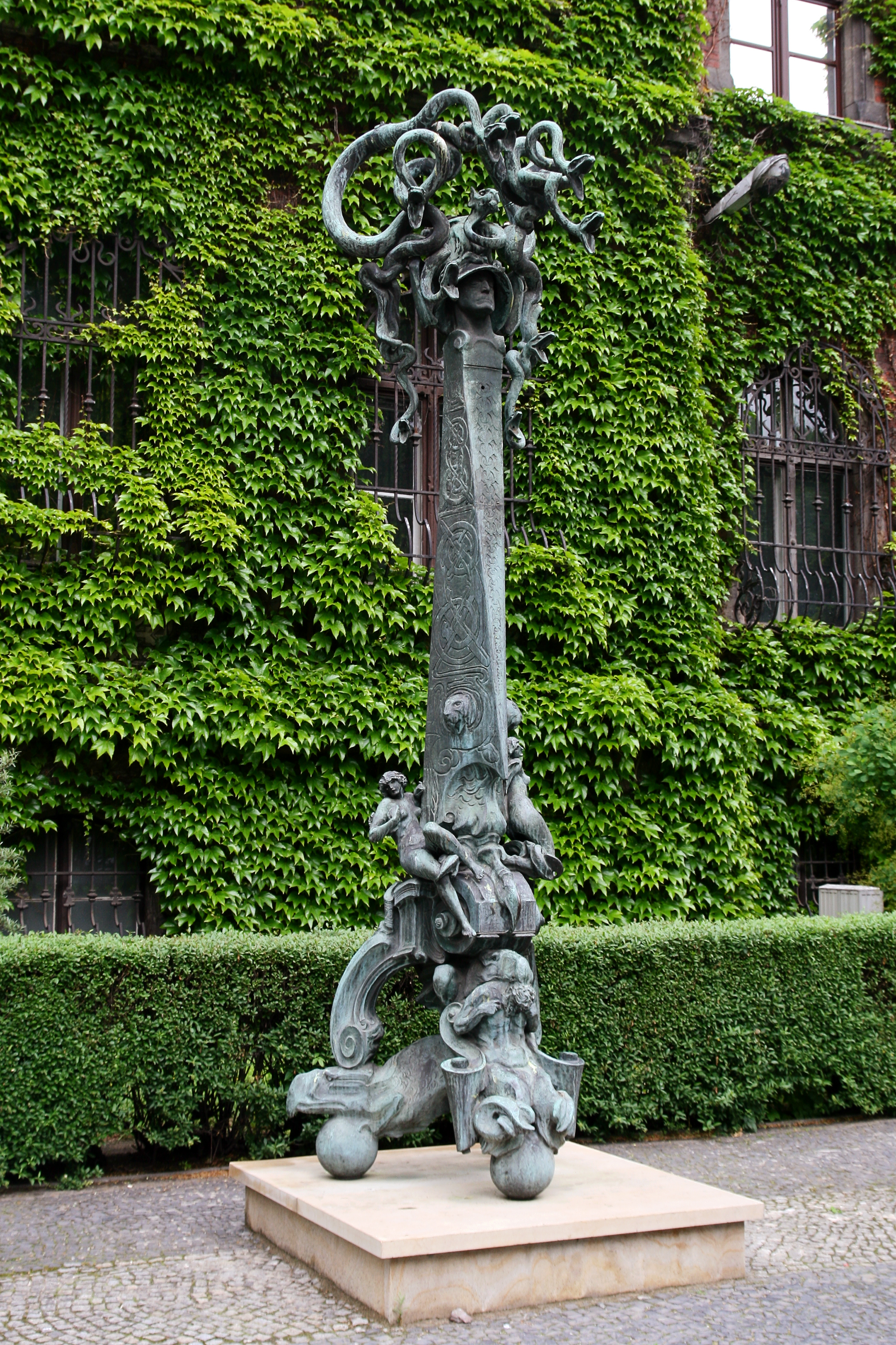
Allegory of the Fishermen (1883), National Museum in Wrocław

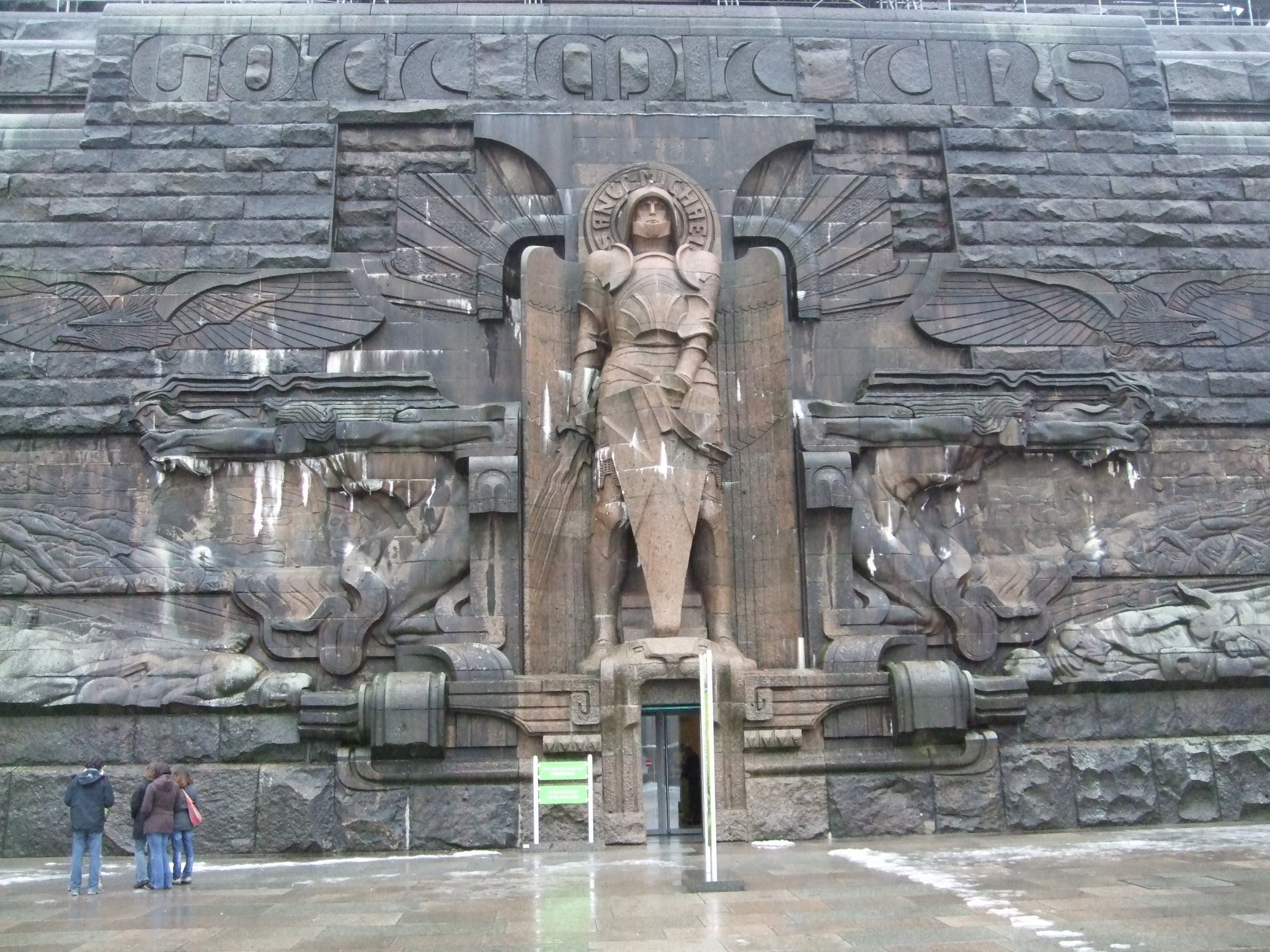
The Archangel Michael at the Völkerschlachtdenkmals

Gustav Christian Friedrich Behrens (12 May 1852 in Gotha – 14 September 1905 in Breslau) was a German sculptor.

== Life ==
Behrens was the eldest son of a farmer and fur trader. After attending the Ernestine Gymnasium, Gotha, in his home town, he completed an apprenticeship with the Gotha court sculptor, Eduard Wolfgang (1825–1874).

In 1870, he went to Dresden where he studied at the Dresden Academy of Fine Arts and, from 1872 to 1877, worked in the studios of Ernst Julius Hähnel. In 1873, when he was only 21, he won a gold medal for his statue (since lost) of Hagen von Tronje from an episode of the Nibelungenlied. Beginning in 1878, he made study trips to Belgium, Holland, Paris, Italy, Vienna, New York and Boston.

From 1880 to 1881, he worked in the studios of Carl Kundmann and Edmund von Hellmer in Vienna. In 1885, he set up his own studio in Dresden and, the next year, was appointed head of the Master Sculpture Studio at the Silesian Museum of Fine Arts in Breslau. Among his students there were Hugo Lederer and Franz Metzner. He was a member of the German Art and Artists Cooperative Association and, in 1896, was designated a Royal Prussian Professor.

Behrens, who had remained unmarried and childless, died at the age of 53 after a long illness.

== Selected works ==
- Monument Allegorie auf die Fischerei in Breslau (1883)
- Group of Figures Der trunkene Zecher (The Drunken Reveler) and Das keifende Weib (The Nagging Wife), over the entrance to the Schweidnitzer Keller at the Town Hall in Breslau (1892)
- Statues of Art und Literature on the northeast corner tower of the Reichstag in Berlin (1894)
- Statue of Abraham Lincoln in the National Museum (1899)
- Statues of Martin Luther and Philipp Melanchthon on the "Bridal Portal" of the Sankt Margarethen church in Gotha (1900)
- Monumental sculpture of the Archangel Michael at the Völkerschlachtdenkmal in Leipzig (1904/05)

== Sources ==
- Matthias Wenzel: Zum 100. Todestag des Bildhauers und Professors Christian Behrens, in: Gothaer Tagespost/TLZ, 15. September 2005
