= Monument to the Battle of the Nations =

Monument in Leipzig, Germany

Monument to the Battle of Nations
- Völkerschlachtdenkmal
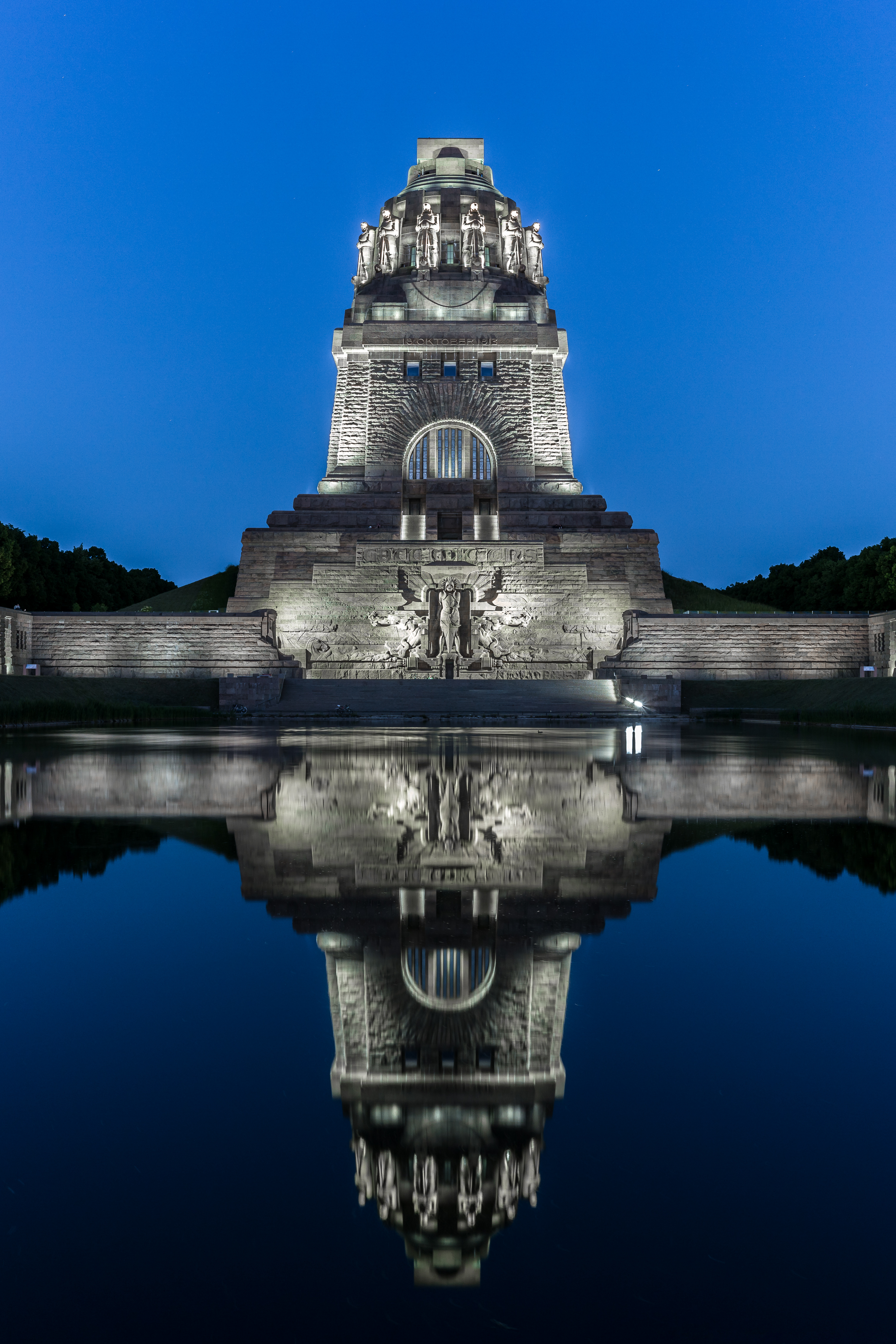
- The monument at night in 2015
- Interactive map of Monument to the Battle of Nations
- Location: Leipzig, Saxony, Germany
- Coordinates: 51°18′44.6″N 12°24′47.8″E
- Designer: Bruno Schmitz
- Material: Granite-faced concrete
- Length: 80 metres (260 ft)
- Width: 70 metres (230 ft)
- Height: 91 metres (299 ft)
- Beginning date: 18 October 1898
- Opening date: 18 October 1913
- Dedicated to: Battle of Leipzig

The Monument to the Battle of the Nations (German: Völkerschlachtdenkmal) is a monument in Leipzig, Germany, to the 1813 Battle of Leipzig, also known as the Battle of the Nations. Paid for mostly by donations and the city of Leipzig, it was completed in 1913 for the 100th anniversary of the battle at a cost of six million gold marks.

The monument commemorates the defeat of Napoleon's French army at Leipzig, a crucial step towards the end of hostilities in the War of the Sixth Coalition. The coalition armies of Russia, Prussia, Austria and Sweden were led by Tsar Alexander I of Russia and Karl Philipp, Prince of Schwarzenberg. There were Germans fighting on both sides, as Napoleon's troops also included conscripted Germans from the left bank of the Rhine annexed by France, as well as troops from his German allies of the Confederation of the Rhine.

The structure is 91 metres (299 ft) tall. It contains over 500 steps to a viewing platform at the top, from which there are views across the city and environs. The structure makes extensive use of concrete, and the facings are of granite. It is widely regarded as one of the best examples of Wilhelmine architecture. The monument is said to stand on the spot of some of the bloodiest fighting, from where Napoleon ordered the retreat of his army. It was also the scene of fighting in World War II, when Nazi forces in Leipzig made their last stand against U.S. troops.

== History ==
=== The War of the Sixth Coalition and the Battle of Leipzig ===
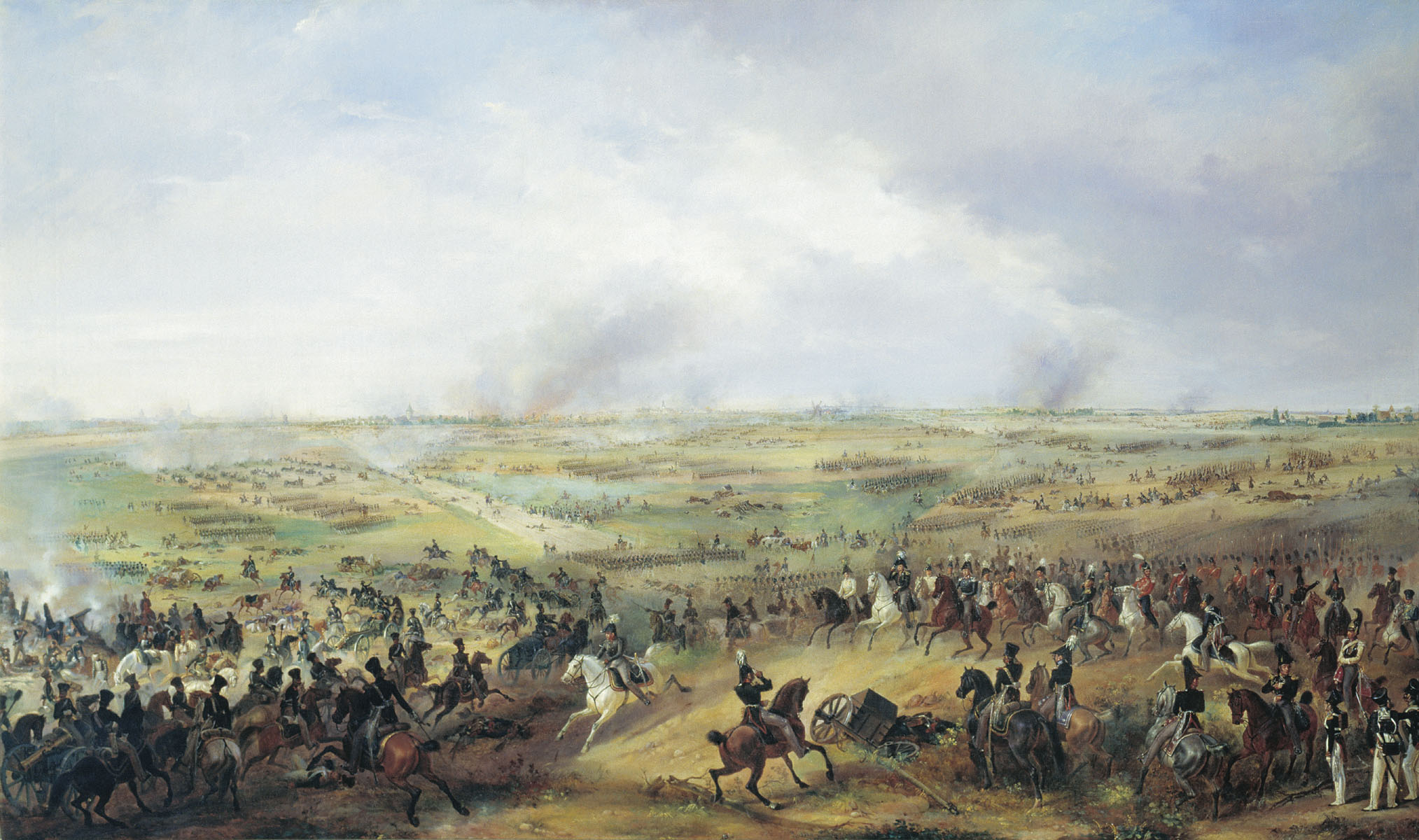
A painting by Russian A.I. Zauerweid, depicting the Battle of the Nations

Following the French Revolution, France had waged a number of wars against its European neighbours. Napoleon Bonaparte had taken control of the country, first as Consul from 1799, and reigned as Emperor of the French under the title Napoleon I since 1804. Over the course of the hostilities, the Holy Roman Empire had ceased to exist following the abdication of Emperor Francis II, bowing to Napoleon's pressure, including the foundation of the Confederation of the Rhine from various former members of the Empire.

The War of the Fifth Coalition in 1809 had ended with another defeat for the joint forces of the Austrian Empire, United Kingdom, Spain, and Portugal against the French and their German allies. Following Napoleon's unsuccessful invasion of Russia in 1812, Prussia joined the countries already at war with France to begin the War of the Sixth Coalition in March 1813. During the early part of the campaign, the allied forces against Napoleon suffered defeats at Großgörschen (2 May) and Bautzen (20–21 May), being driven back to the river Elbe. However, due to lack of training in his newly recruited soldiers, Napoleon was unable to take full advantage of his victories, allowing his enemies to regroup. Following a ceasefire, Austria rejoined the Coalition on 17 August. The French advantage in numbers was now reversed, with the Coalition forces counting 490,000 soldiers to Napoleon's 440,000.

Between 16 and 19 October 1813, the Battle of the Nations outside Leipzig was the decisive one in the war, cementing the French defeat and temporarily ending Napoleon's rule. The Emperor was exiled to Elba in May 1814, but briefly returned to power the following year, before being permanently banished following his defeat at the Battle of Waterloo. The Battle of the Nations was fought between France and their German allies against a coalition of Russian, Austrian, Prussian, and Swedish forces. About half a million soldiers were involved and at the end of the battle, around 110,000 men had lost their lives, with many more dying in the days after in field hospitals in and around the city. The scope of the fighting was unprecedented.

=== Remembrance of the Battle of the Nations between 1813 and 1871 ===
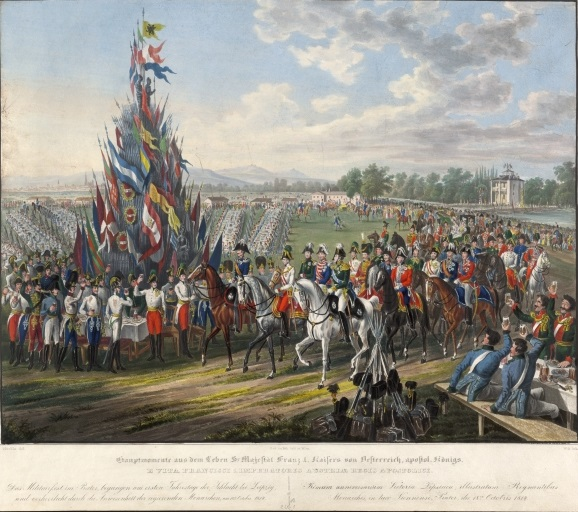
A celebration with Emperor Francis I of Austria on the first anniversary of the Battle of Leipzig at the Prater in Vienna on 18 October 1814. Events such as this took place in all of Germany on that day.

In the immediate aftermath, both the Battle of Leipzig as well as the Wars of Liberation (Befreiungskriege), as they became known in Germany, soon established a controversial and divided culture of remembrance. For liberal thinkers and young, educated students, many of whom had fought in the wars, they resembled a starting point for a potential German unification into a national state. This sentiment was embodied in the mythologization of the Freikorps and Landwehr regiments, volunteer fighters against the French rule. On the other side, the monarchs of the German states as well as conservatives highlighted the role the princes had played in the struggle against Napoleon, seeing a growing desire for a German national state as an attack on their royal and noble positions.

Ernst Moritz Arndt, a leading liberal and nationalistic writer, called for a commemoration of the battle throughout Germany. He pronounced that the anniversary on 19 October should be marked by festivities with "burning fires, festive 'folk' clothing, oak wreaths, and the ringing of bells". The first anniversary of the battle consequently was marked by celebrations across the German countries, including bonfires. However, in some territories such as Baden and Württemberg, such celebrations were prohibited, while in the Kingdom of Hanover, they were incorporated into the festivities around George III's jubilee on 23 October. In Berlin, the capital of the Kingdom of Prussia, the main celebration was organised by the Turner movement, gymnastic clubs led by nationalist Friedrich Ludwig Jahn. Taking place at the Hasenheide, a park outside Berlin, the event was attended by several tens of thousands of people. Similar celebrations were held the following years. These included the Wartburg Festival in 1817, a nationalistic event commemorating both Martin Luther's stay at the Wartburg as well as the Battle of Leipzig. However, following the Carlsbad Decrees of 1819 both the Burschenschaften, the nationalistic student groups, as well as the Turners, were outlawed, and commemoration of the Battle of Leipzig subsided over the following years. In the 1840s, the "Association for the Celebration of October 19" was established in Leipzig, partly reviving the remembrance of the event, however, only the anniversaries in 1838 and 1863 were "forcefully expressed". In 1863, for the battle's 50th anniversary, the city of Leipzig put up large festivities, inviting representatives from 200 German cities and several hundred veterans. The celebrations included nationalistic songs and the reading of poems, with between 25,000 and 30,000 people in attendance.

=== First proposals for a monument at the site of the battle ===
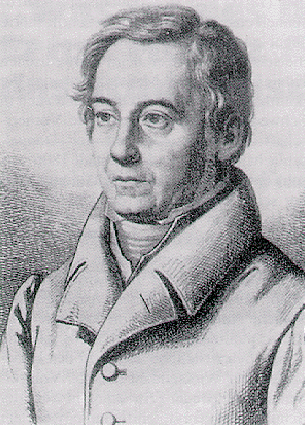
Historian and writer Ernst Moritz Arndt was the first to propose a large monument on the site of the Battle of Leipzig.

Shortly after the Battle of Leipzig, Arndt called for a monument to be built at the site. In a pamphlet entitled "Ein Wort über die Feier der Leipziger Schlacht" ("A Word on the Celebration of the Battle of Leipzig"), he demanded that it "has to be constructed in such a way that it can be seen from all the streets around from which the allied armies moved to the bloody decisive battle. If it is to be seen, it has to be large and splendid – like a collosus, a pyramid, a Cologne Cathedral". His plans included a 60 m (200 ft) high mound surrounded by oak groves, with a large cross on top. However, lack of political will prevented such a monument of being built at the time. Arndt, together with the painter Caspar David Friedrich, worked on a monument for Gerhard von Scharnhorst, who had died from injuries sustained in the Battle of Großgörschen, but received no support from state officials. In a letter to Arndt, Friedrich lamented in March 1814: "I am not at all surprised, that no memorials are being erected, neither to mark the great cause of the Volk, nor to the manganimous deeds of great German men. As long as we remain man-servants to the princes, nothing of this sort will happen." Other people came forward with plans for a large memorial as well, including Karl Sieveking and August von Kotzebue, the latter of whom suggested a 31 m (102 ft) tall Roman column with an Iron Cross on top, symbolising the victory of Germany against France, the "modern Rome". The architect Friedrich Weinbrenner proposed a fortress to be built outside Leipzig, at the top of which a pyramid was to be placed, with the quadriga that Napoleon had taken from the Brandenburg Gate in Berlin situated on it. On the other side of the political spectrum, the nobleman Adolph von Seckendorff put forward the plan for a simple monument to the Saxon government, which would bear an inscription reading "To the liberation of a strong land, Alexander, Franz, and Friedrich Wilhelm", honouring the three monarchs who led the fight against Napoleon. While none of the proposals for Leipzig gained any support, a monument for the Wars of Liberation was erected in Berlin in 1821. Designed by Karl Friedrich Schinkel, it was a miniature of a gothic church tower situated on top of the Kreuzberg, bearing the names of twelve battles fought against the French. Its inscription, "From the king to the people who, at his call, nobly sacrificed their blood and chattels to the Fatherland", highlighted the role of the monarch over that of the people.

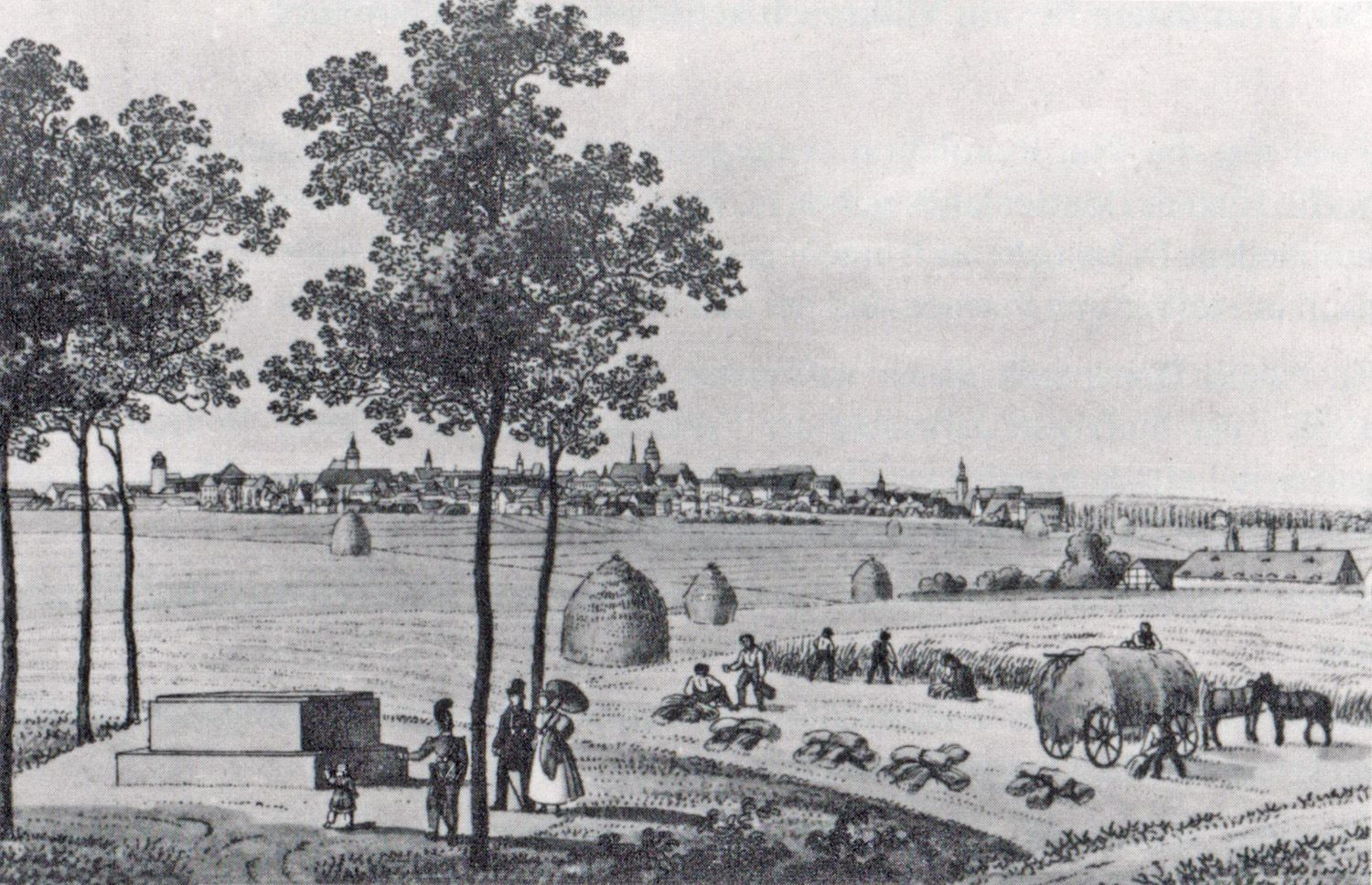
The cornerstone, laid down in 1863, in a drawing from around 1880

On the first anniversary of the battle, in 1814, a 18 m (59 ft) tall wooden cross was placed as a monument on the village green close to the burned out church in Probstheida. Attached to it was a collection box for donations in order to rebuild the church. Originally envisioned by both the citizens of Leipzig as well as the Russian military command as the place for annual celebration of the battle, the cross was removed by the winter of the same year, following the division of the Kingdom of Saxony at the Congress of Vienna. In 1817, a monument to Józef Poniatowski, a Marshal of the French Empire who had died in the battle, was placed by his sister and Polish veterans near the battle site. After the establishment of the "Association for the Celebration of October 19", more small monuments started to be built. The family of Karl Philipp, Prince of Schwarzenberg also placed a monument in his honour at the site, in 1838. In 1843, a sandstone monument was erected at "Napoleon Hill", where the Emperor had supposedly watched the battle. Two years later, the local government of Leipzig established another monument, commemorating the entrance of the victorious forces into the city. Until 1863, seven memorial stones were also placed to mark decisive points of the battle, which still remain to this day. In the same year, on the 50th anniversary of the Battle of Leipzig, city officials also funded the restoration of the monument they had erected in 1845. During the same festivities, a cornerstone for a future grand monument was placed by Leipzig's mayor Karl Wilhelm Otto Koch, and 23 cities from all around Germany, including Vienna, Hanover, and Dresden, pledged money for its construction. A competition for the design of a bigger monument was also started for the anniversary, without success. However, the Unification of Germany and the subsequent foundation of the German Empire temporarily halted plans for a monument, since public conscience turned towards the more recent military victories. The commemoration of the Battle of Leipzig as a decisive one in German history was replaced by the Battle of Sedan and the city of Leipzig erected a monument to the German unification in its centre in 1888. Steffen Poser, head of the Museum of the Monument for the Battle of the Nations, wrote: "[T]he foundation of the German Empire deprived the monument project of what had been its basis for legitimacy so far—namely, the desire for German unification, the leitmotif, which had been missing at the time."

== Construction ==
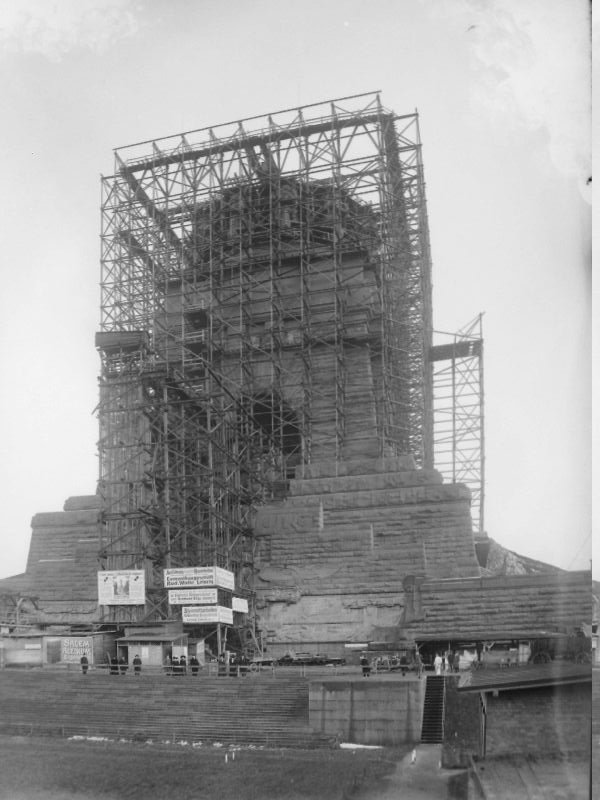
The monument under construction in 1912

In 1894, Clemens Thieme (de), a member of the Verein für die Geschichte Leipzigs (Association for the History of Leipzig) learned during a meeting of the association about the past plans to build a monument. Interested in resuming the project, Thieme, who was also a member of the Apollo masonic lodge and represented the National Liberal Party in Leipzig's city parliament, proposed the project during a meeting and gained the support of his fellow masons. Later that same year, he founded the Deutsche Patriotenbund (Association of German Patriots) which raised, by means of donations and a lottery, the funds necessary to construct the monument for the 100th anniversary. The projected cost was set at ℳ6,000,000 (€33,000,000 in 2021). The following year, the city of Leipzig donated a 40,000-square-metre (9.9-acre) site for the construction.

A first competition to find an architectural design was started in August 1895, with prizes for the best handed out. During the first round, only 32 design were handed in, with first prize going to Karl Doflein from Berlin. However, the Patriotenbund was unhappy with the results on the grounds that they were not innovative enough and none was eventually chosen for the monument. In the second round of the competition, which started in August 1896, participation was much larger, with 71 drafts submitted. The jury met to discuss on 21 and 22 December of the same year, with first prize this time going to Wilhelm Kreis. Bruno Schmitz, an architect from Berlin who had earlier designed both the Kyffhäuser Monument in Thuringia as well as the Deutsches Eck in Koblenz, won fourth prize with a design of a round tower with a dome on top. The Patriotic Association was again not convinced of the winning design and contemplated a third round, but in order not to lose more time, eventually decided to give the commission to Schmitz, who was the most well-respected German architect of the time. While Schmitz was the principal architect, Thieme took great influence on the design, leading to the monument having a distinctive character from Schmitz' earlier work. Schmitz delivered a new design in June 1897, which resembled the final result. This was approved by the Patriotic Association on 18 October 1897 and then presented to Emperor Wilhelm II for approval. In August, the design was presented during the Große Berliner Kunstausstellung in August 1898, where it won a prize. Several more design changes, especially to the top of the building, were made in the followings years.

A ground-breaking ceremony was held prior to the start of construction on 18 October 1898, the 85th anniversary of the battle. A total of 82,000 cubic metres (107,000 cu yd) of earth were moved in the following two years until suitable subsoil for the foundation was found. Construction then commenced in mid-September 1900, at which time the original cornerstone from 1863 was moved to the new location. The foundation slab, 70 m (77 yd) times 80 m (87 yd) in area and 2 m (2.2 yd) thick, was constructed from concrete, as was a total of about 90 per cent of the entire monument. Concrete, a relatively new material at the time, was used for the first time in such a large structure. Proponents in expert literature argued for an iron construction as granting more stability, but the factors of cost and higher creative freedom ultimately led to the use of concrete. Work on the foundations alone took five years. In total, 26,500 granite blocks and 120,000 cubic metres (160,000 cu yd) of concrete were used for the entire structure. Due to the use of state-of-the-art machineries, such as traction engines, lifts, a concrete mixer, and a cable railway for transporting gravel, construction was finished on schedule, in time for the 100th anniversary of the battle in 1913. The financing, which had originally been thought to rely solely on donations and a lottery, ran out, leading the city of Leipzig to subsidise the remaining costs. The keystone was laid on 13 May 1912 by Thieme. Final works were done over the remaining year, including a late decision to add glass windows around the Ruhmeshalle to safeguard it from the weather.

On 18 October 1913 the Völkerschlachtdenkmal was inaugurated in the presence of about 100,000 people including the Emperor, and all the reigning sovereign rulers of the German states. At the time of completion, it was the tallest monument in Europe.

== Design of the Monument ==
=== Style ===
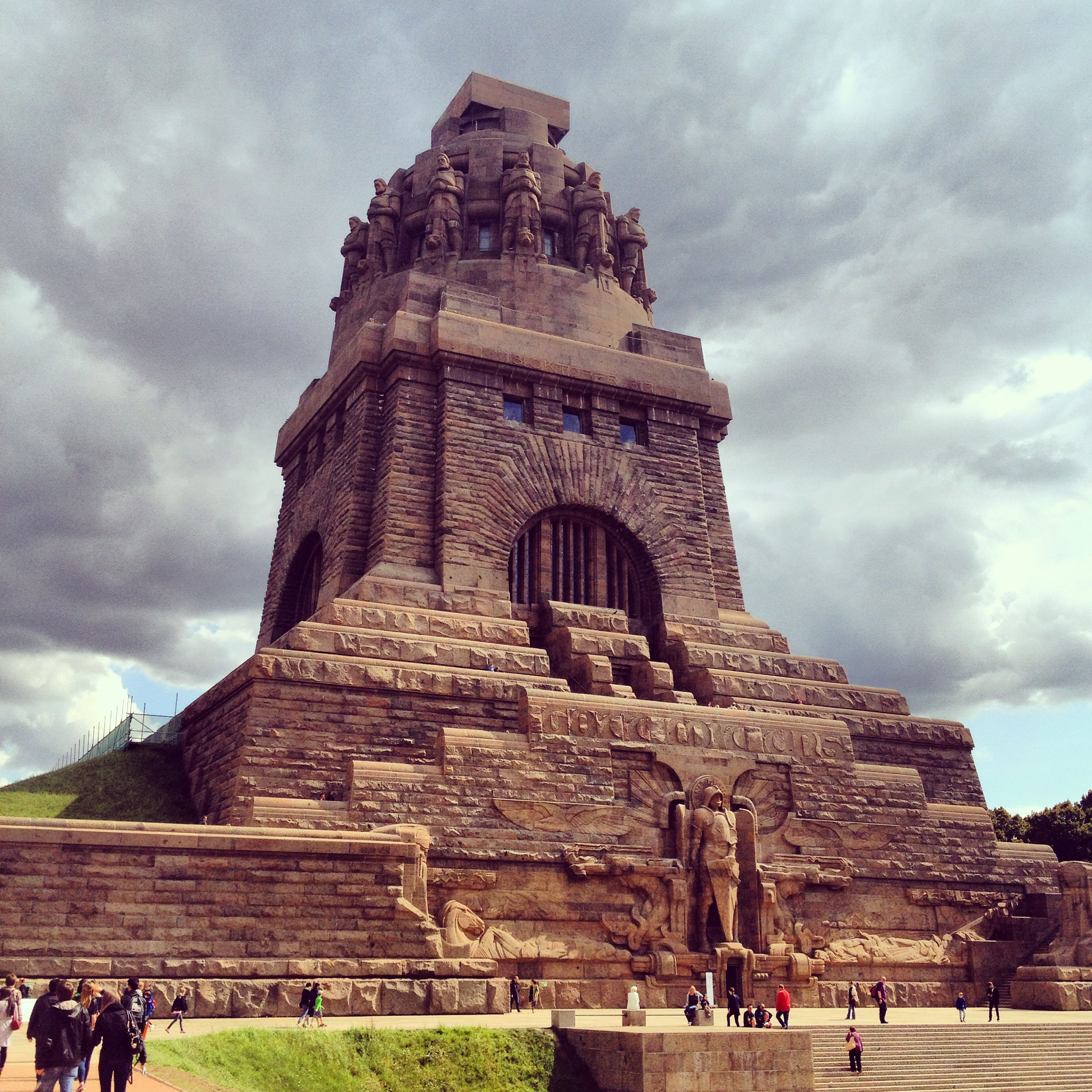
Outside view of the front of the monument (2014)

Schmitz constructed the monument over an artificial hill and selected a pyramidal shape for a clear view of the surroundings. The base is 124 metres (407 ft) square. The main structure, at 91 metres (299 ft), is as of 2013 still the tallest monument in Europe. Poser places the monument in a line of tradition of similar national monuments of the 19th century. The design deviates consciously from the style of the Wilhelmine period of the time, as the architects attempted to develop a distinctly German style in architecture and sculpture. A "multitude of symbols and metaphors", as Poser writes, "makes a clear characterisation of the Monument difficult even today." Many of the sculptures reflect the masonic ideas of the members of the Patriotenbund, aimed at introducing them to the general public through the monument. Unlike many monuments and buildings of the era, the monument lacks classicist style elements, instead borrowing from the architecture of ancient Mesopotamia and Egypt. Thieme, who made frequent adjustments to Schmitz's design, most often under the premise of cutting costs, worked together with the Art Nouveau sculptors Christian Behrens and his apprentice Franz Metzner. Following Behrens' death in 1905, Metzner completed the work, mainly on the sculptures on the inside and top of the monument. When Behrens died, the sculpture of Archangel Saint Michael, the relief of the battle scene and the heads of Emperor Frederick I, better known as Barbarossa, had been completed and delivered to the building site in 1904.

=== Description of the Monument ===
==== Exterior of the structure ====
At the front side of the monument, a 19 m (21 yd) high and 60 m (66 yd) wide relief depicts a battle scene. The centre piece of the relief is a sculpture of the Archangel Saint Michael, symbolising the personification of God's support for the German soldiers. Above Michael, an engraving reads "Gott mit uns" ["God with us"]. To either side of the archangel, furies carry the firebrand of war, while two eagles symbolise the "newly won freedom". On both sides of the relief, lateral staircases with 136 steps lead to the second story and the entrance of the crypt. The staircases are decorated with large heads of Frederick I, reminding of the myth of a sleeping emperor and "as expressions of the people's hopes for better times". At the top of the monument, of the outside of the dome roof, stand twelve warrior statues, each composed of 47 granite blocks and 13 m (14 yd) tall, meant to remind of the Germans' will to defend themselves. In the inaugural text about the monument, these statues were described as "guardians of freedom and pillars of justice".

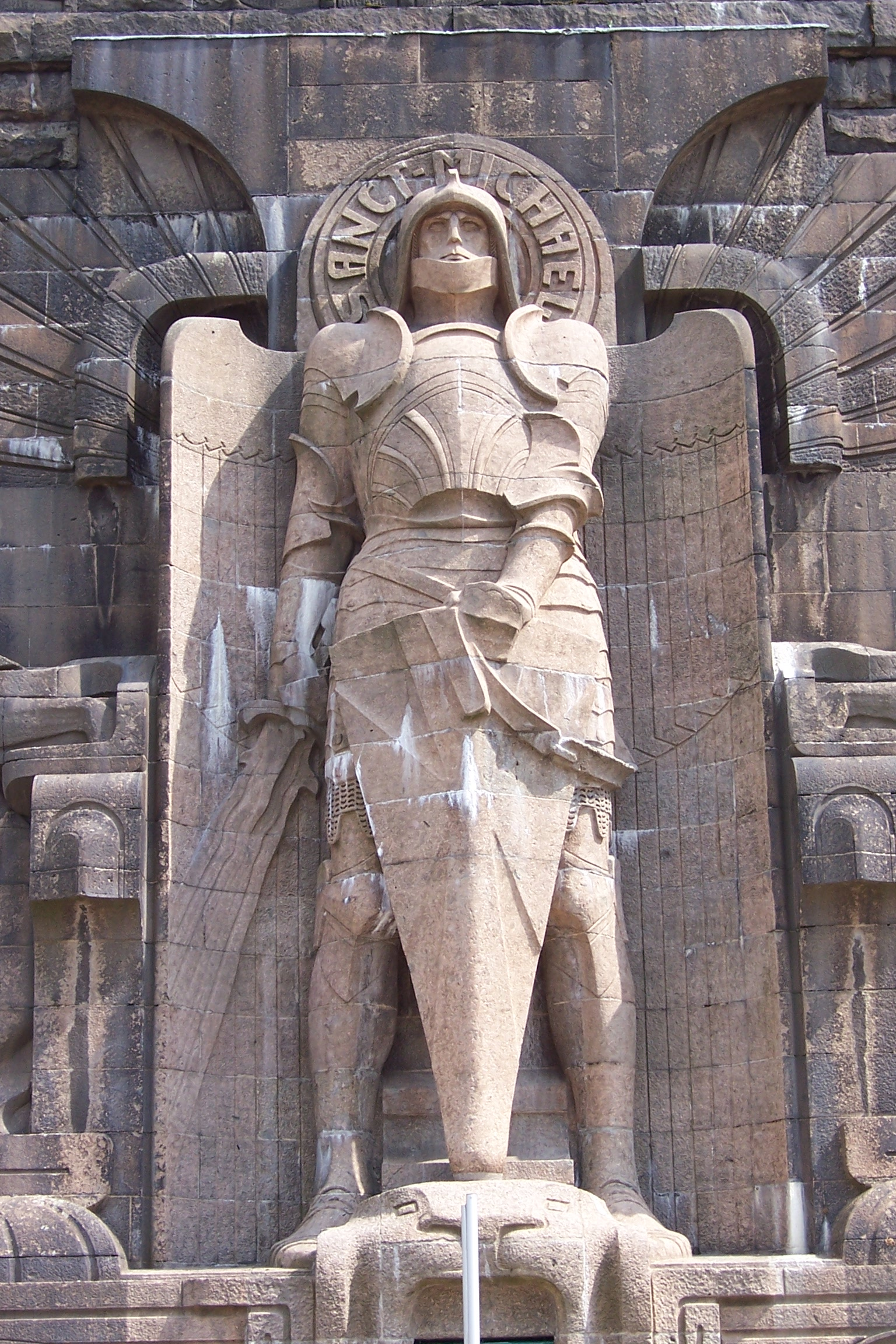
Archangel Michael

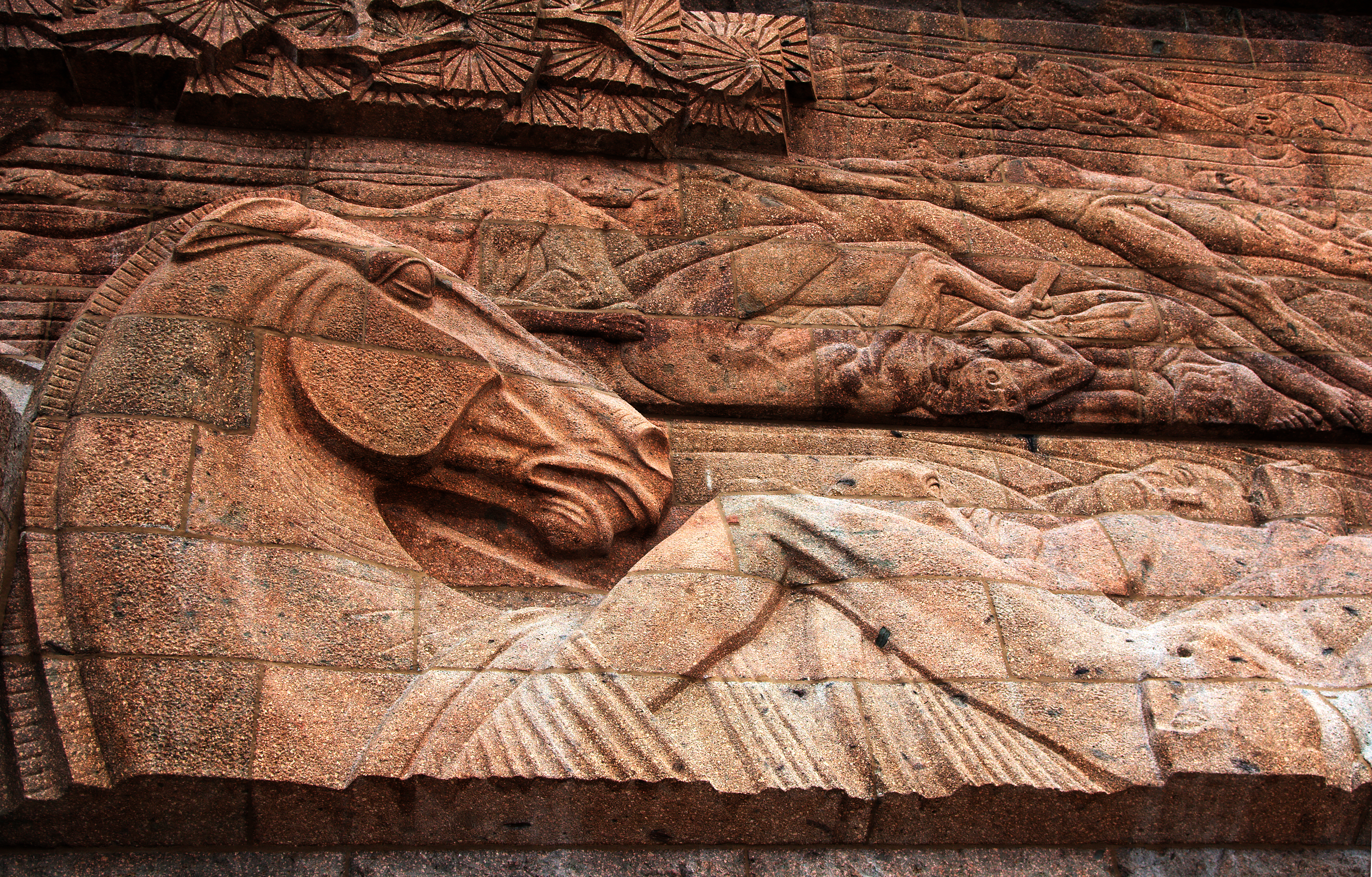
Detail of a horse on the left side of the front relief

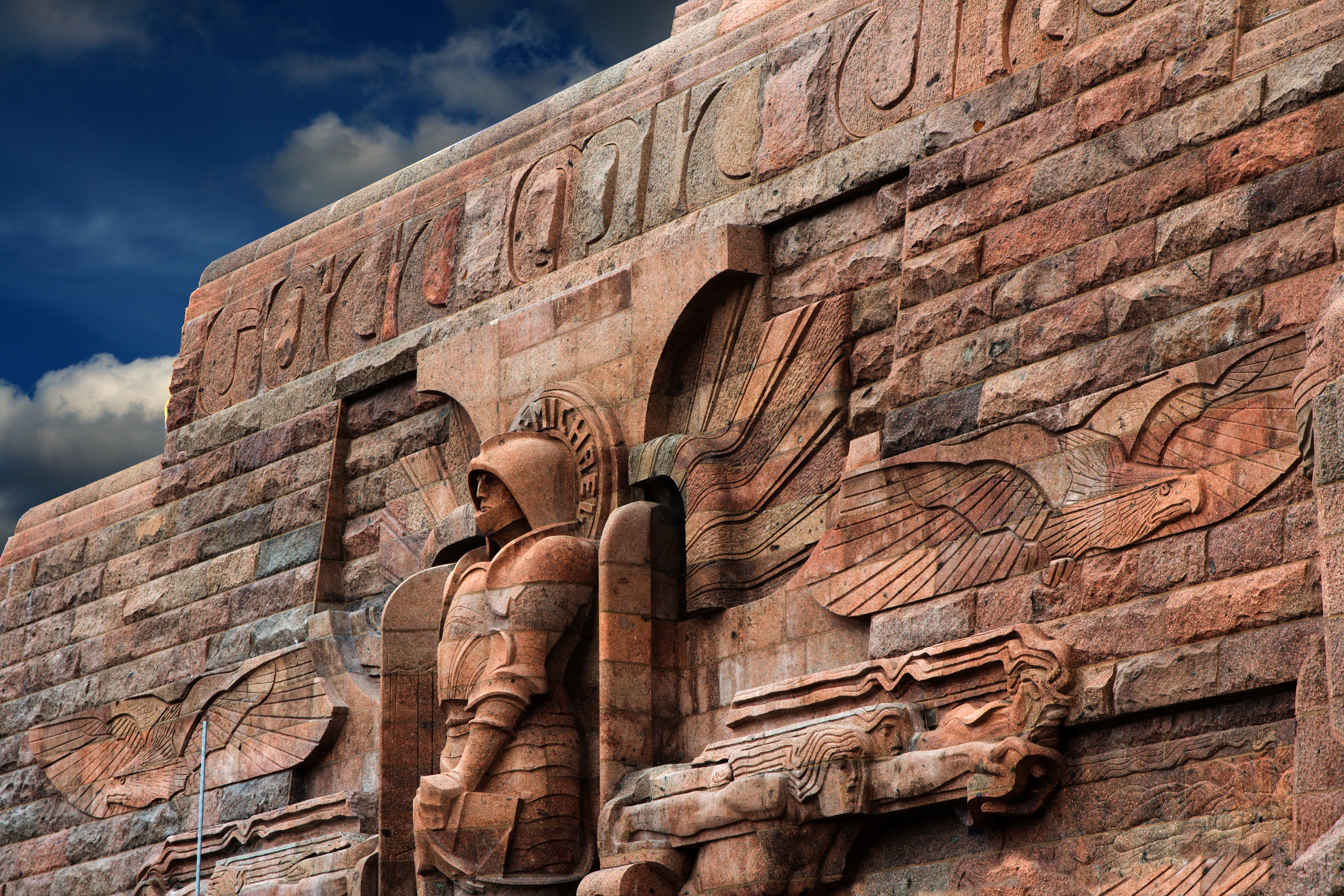
View of the relief from the right side, with Gott mit uns inscription visible

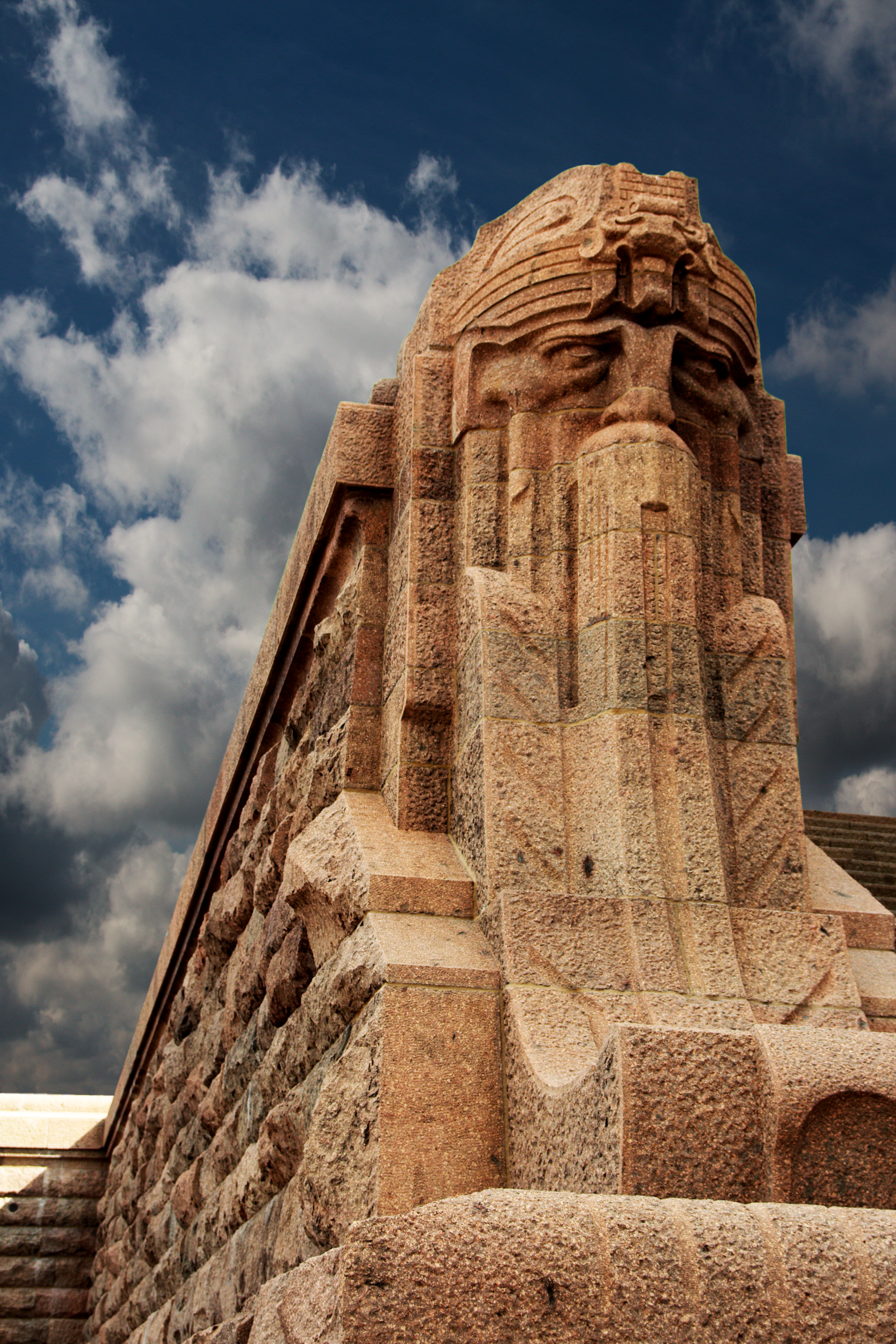
One of the heads of Barbarossa next to the staircases

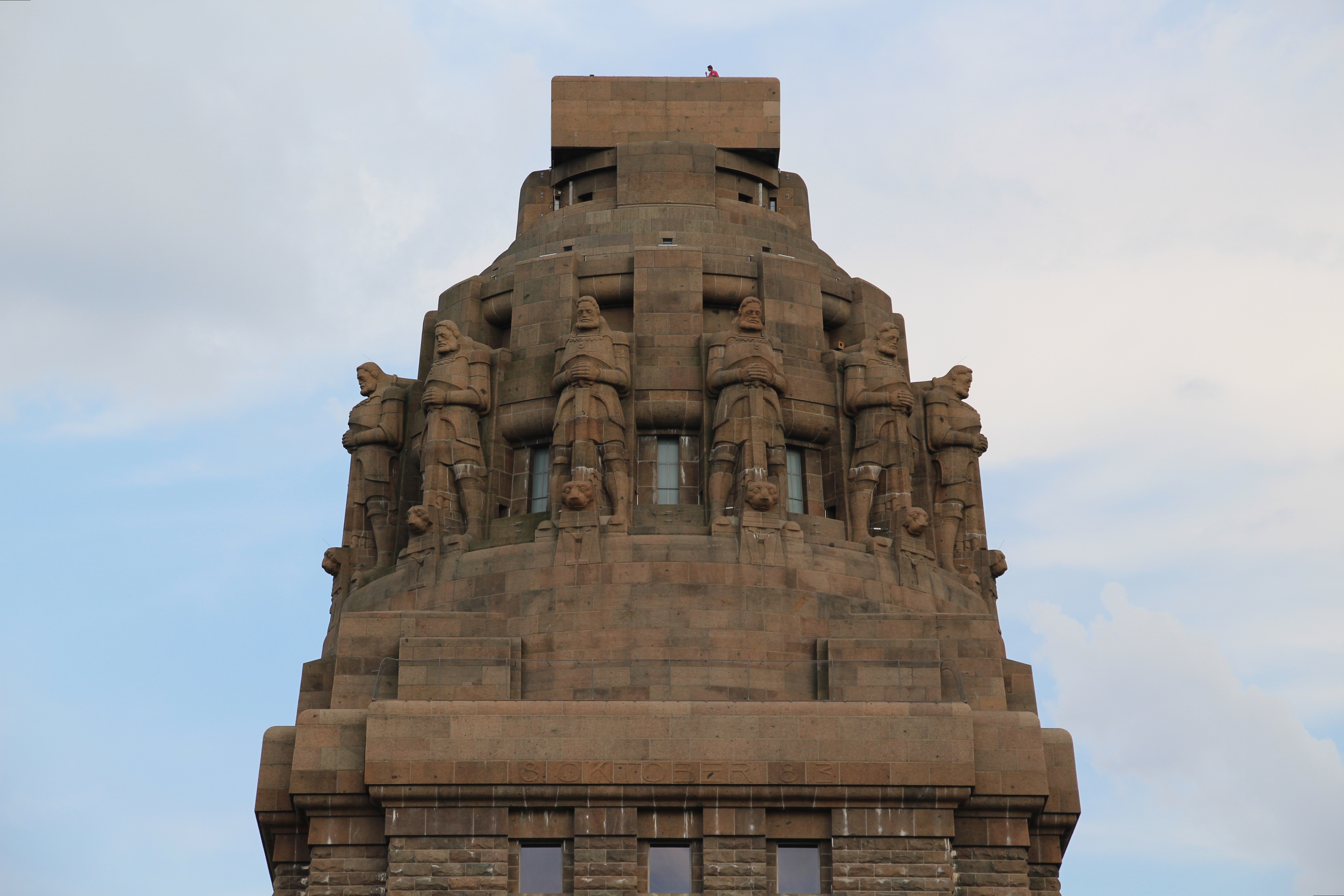
View of the guardian statues on the outside of the dome

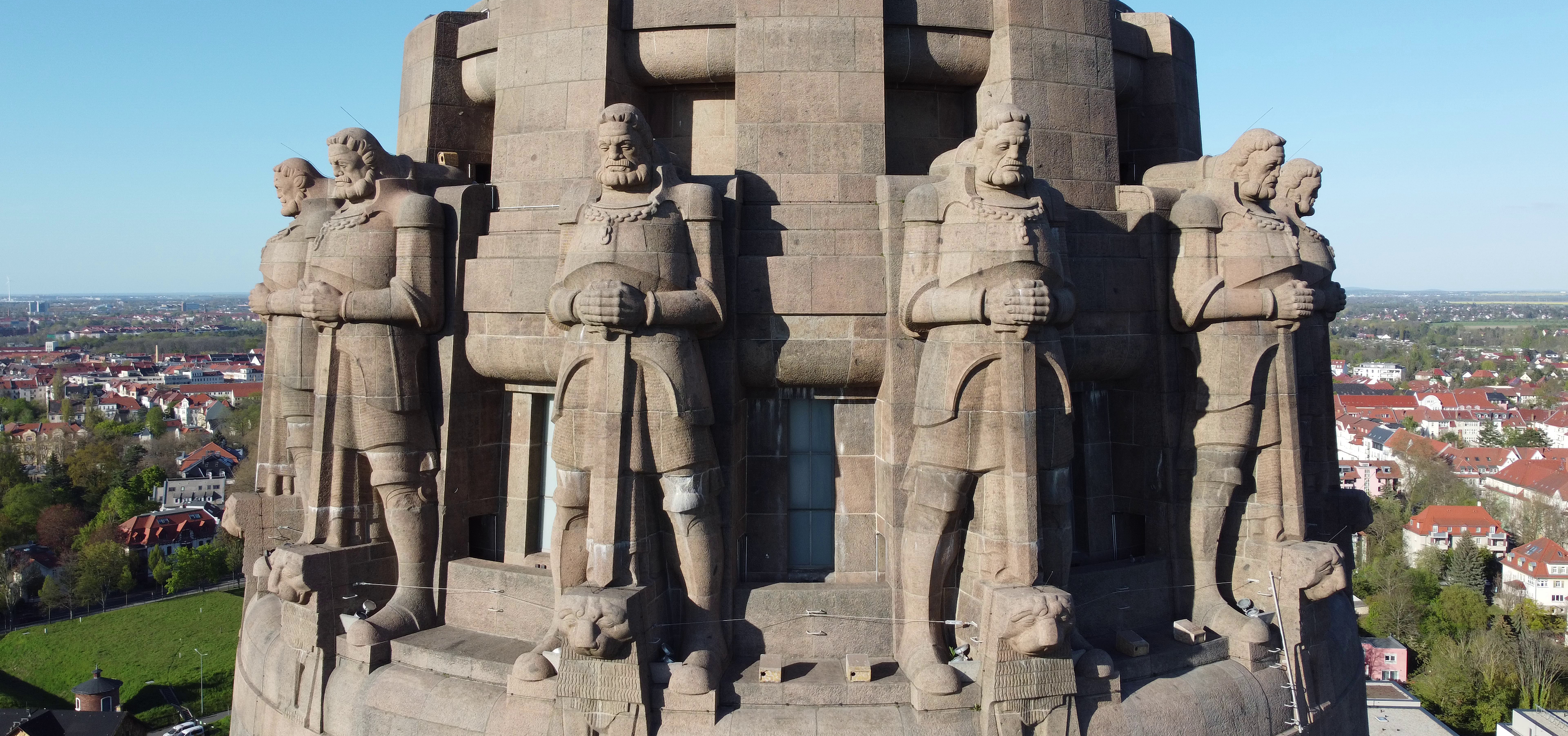
Close-up of the statues

==== On the inside ====
In the circle-shaped crypt on the first floor, sixteen statues of warriors (Totenwächter) are present, symbolically standing guard, two each in front of a total of eight 6 m (6.6 yd) high death masks. The crypt was meant as a symbolic tomb for the fallen soldiers of the battle. In the Ruhmeshalle (Hall of Fame) on the second floor, four large sculptures are placed facing each other, each meant to symbolise a virtue of the German people (bravery, strength of faith, people's strength, and sacrifice). Each of these sculptures is 9.5 m (10.4 yd) tall. Towering above the crypt is a 68 m (74 yd) high dome. Leading towards it, pillared windows are decorated with 96 smaller sculptures representing the suffering in war. The dome itself is filled with "324 almost life-sized equestrian statues representing the homecoming of the victors". The dome, 29 m (32 yd) in diameter, creates unusual acoustics which allow for concerts to take place within the inner hall. From the crypt, 364 steps lead visitors to the observation platform on top of the monument.

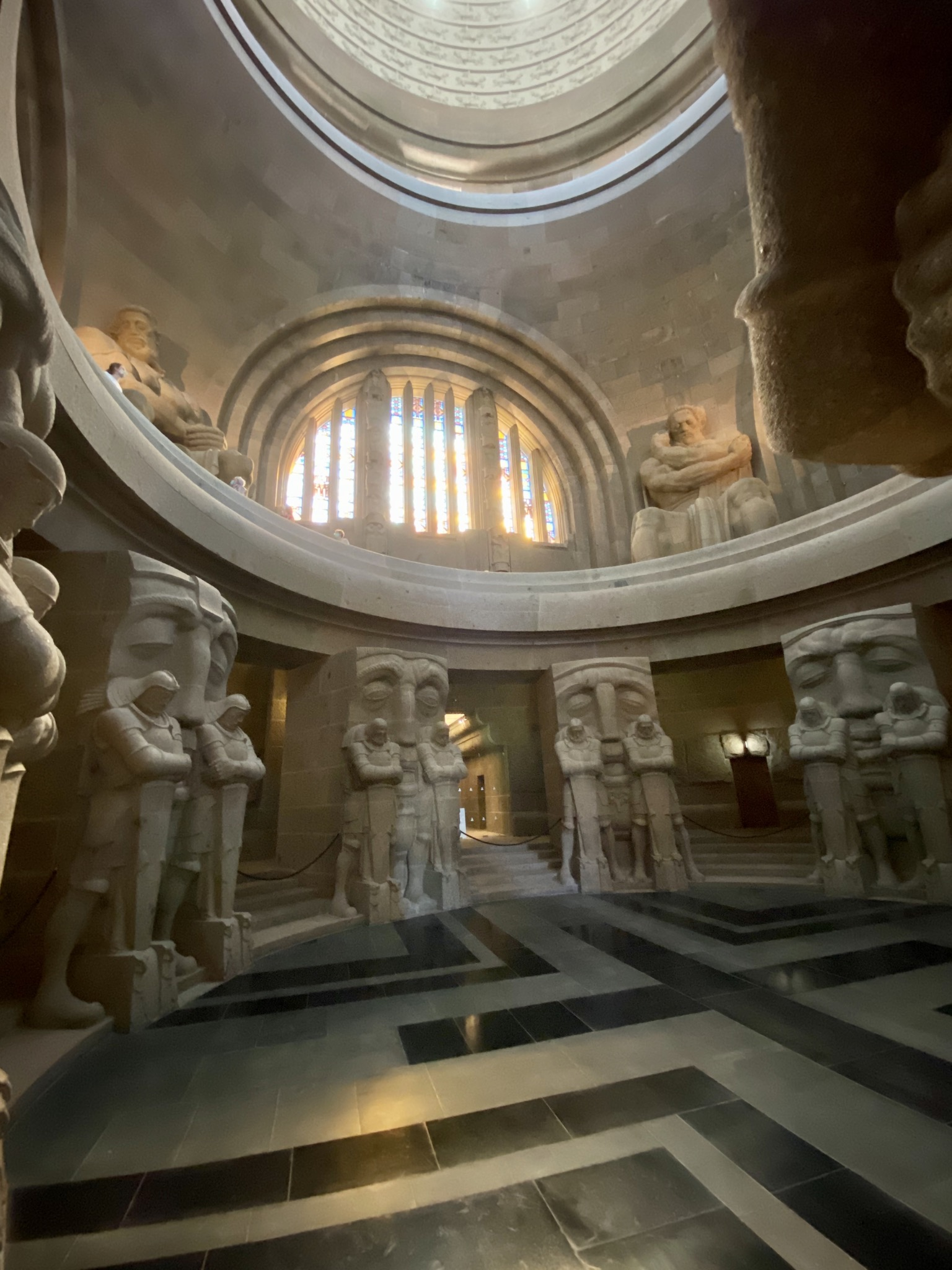
View from inside the crypt with the guarding warriors and death masks visible

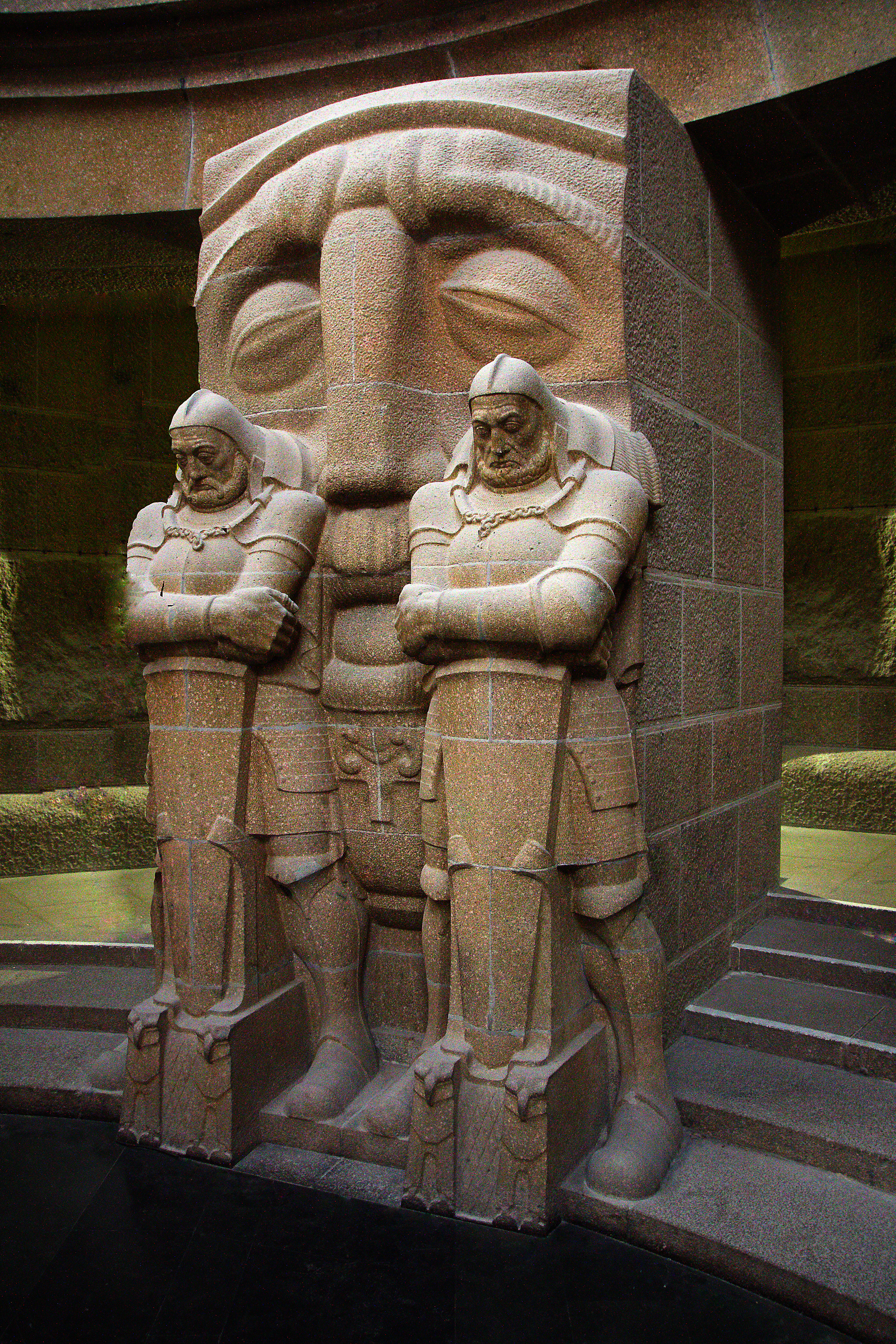
Detailed view of guarding warriors next to a death mask

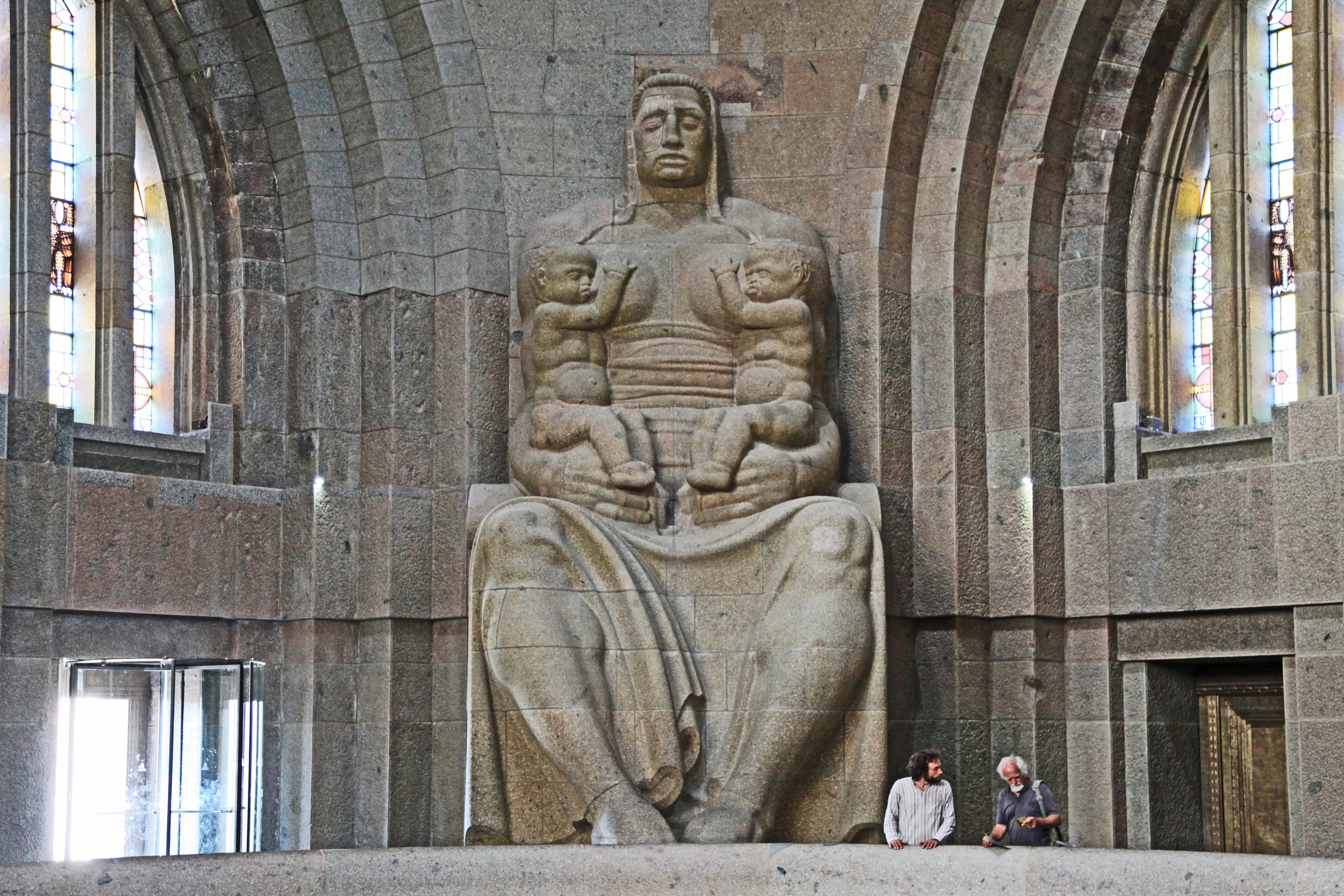
Picture of the sculpture representing "People's strength" in the Ruhmeshalle

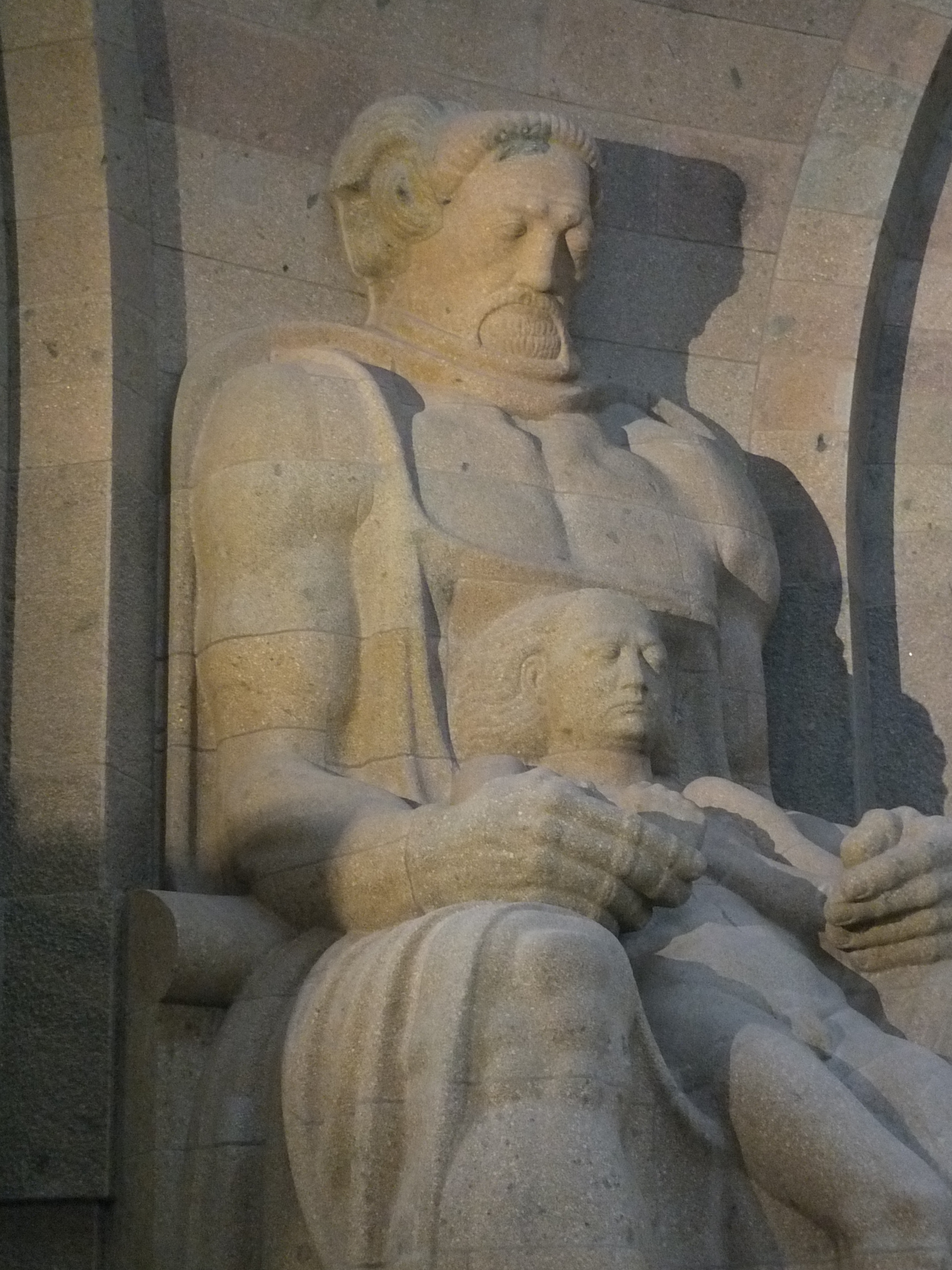
Detail of the sculpture representing "Strength of faith"

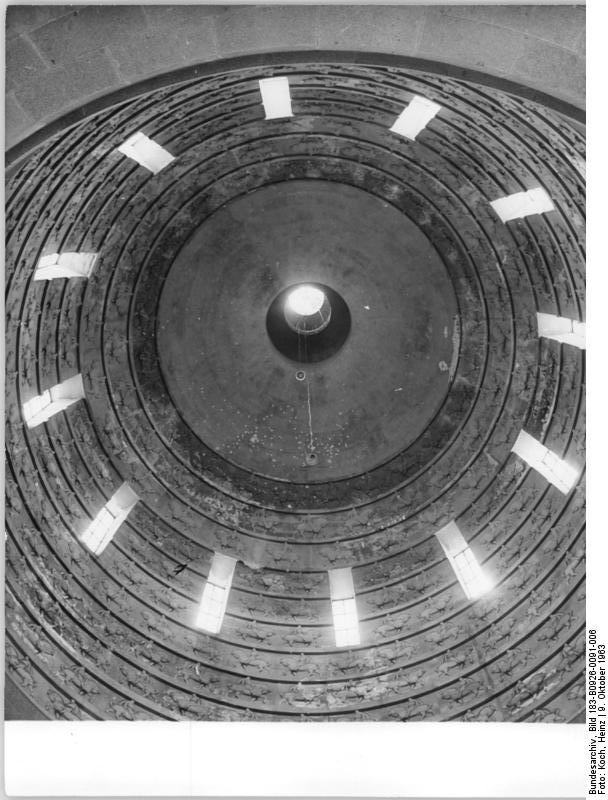
Dome of the memorial

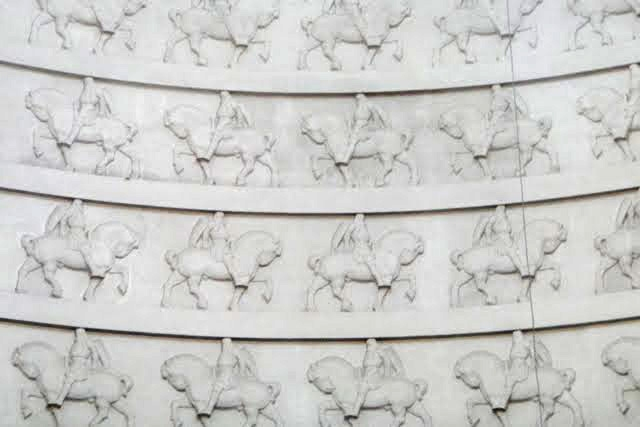
Details of the horse statues on the inside of the dome

==== Surroundings ====
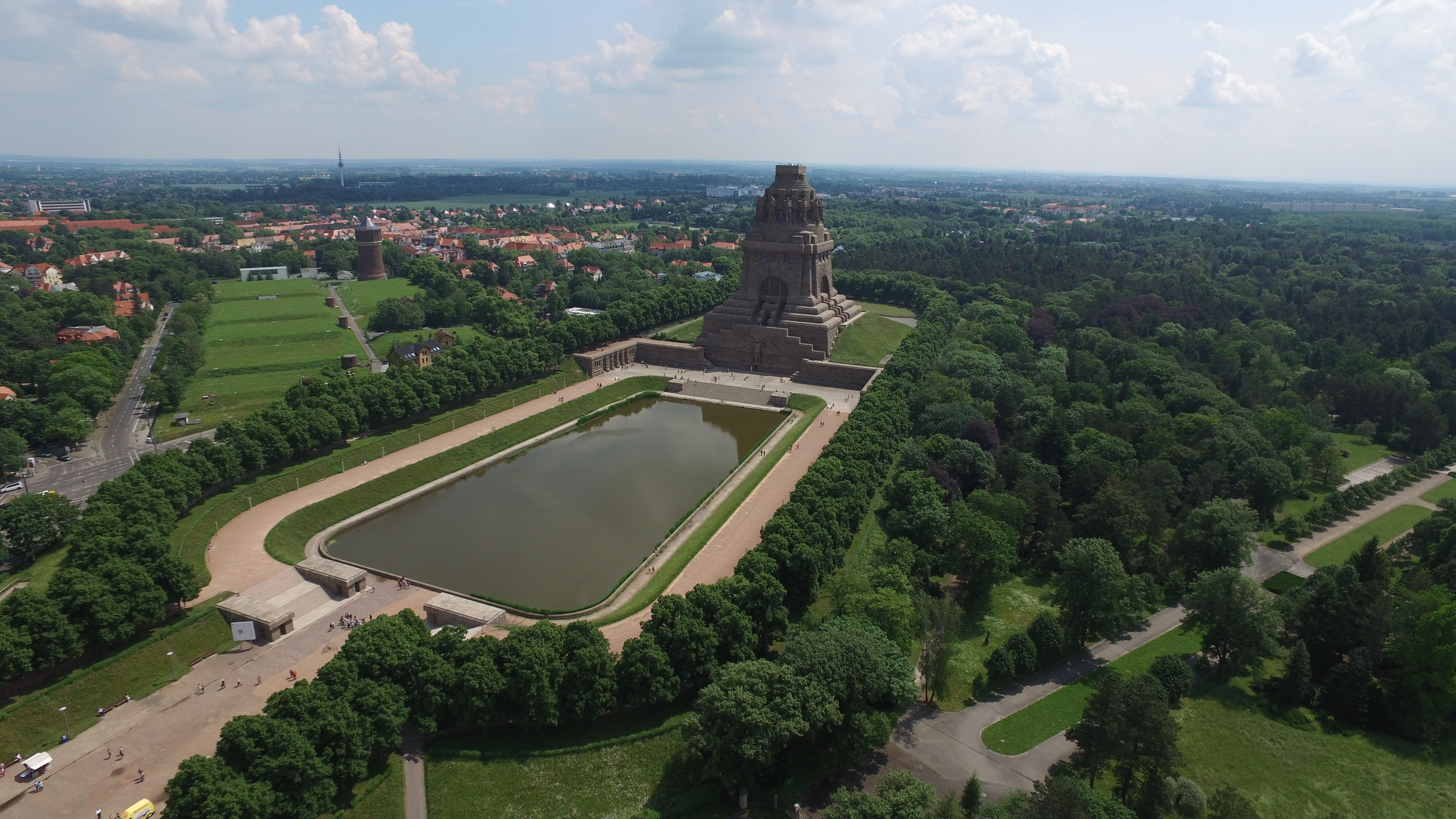
View of the monument and the adjacent reflecting pool

Schmitz also planned to create an accompanying complex for ceremonies that would include a court, a stadium and parade grounds. However, only a reflecting pool and two processional avenues were ultimately completed. Surrounding the monument are oaks, considered to have been a symbol of masculine strength and endurance to the Germanic people of antiquity. The oaks are complemented by evergreens, symbolising feminine fecundity, and they are located in a subordinate position to the oaks.

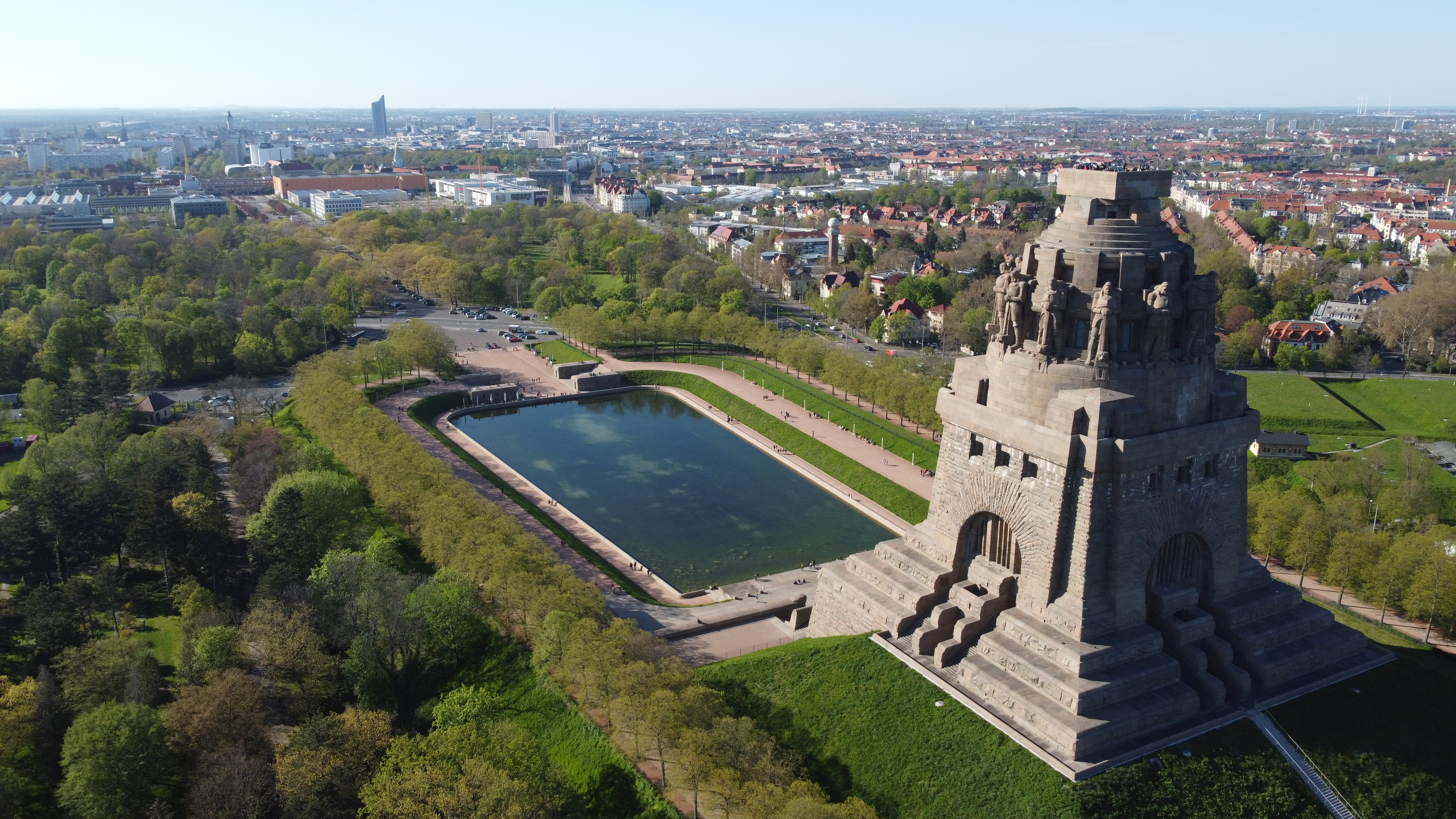
In the background can be seen the City-Hochhaus and the New Town Hall.

==== Reception ====
The architectural style of the monument was immediately divisive even among contemporaries. While commentators from the völkisch-nationalistic side hailed it as a major artistic achievement, people from the political left, like Social Democrats, described it as a "heap of rocks", which had "nothing to do with art". The style proved influential, for instance in Eliel Saarinen's design for a new parliament building in Canberra in 1912.

== Reception and usage of the monument through the decades ==
=== World War I and Weimar Republic ===
Originally intended by the Association of German Patriots as a symbol for the achievement of German unity after a long period of struggle throughout the 19th century, the monument was soon accepted as a Nationaldenkmal (national monument), with different groups projecting different symbolism onto it. At the time of its opening in 1913, the Patriotic Association declared in a publication that the monument symbolized a connection from the Wars of Liberation to "Sedan and Versailles", meaning the foundation of the German Empire in 1870/71. During World War I, the monument was used by the Association to host events supporting the war effort, such as rallies to raise war bonds or celebrations of the birthday of Field Marshal Paul von Hindenburg. As the war neared its end, the focus of events shifted more towards the monument's original intention. Instead of remembrance for the fallen of a battle one hundred years prior, it now became a site for grieving for the recent dead on the battlefield, such as during a large church service for remembrance of the fallen on 24 June 1918.

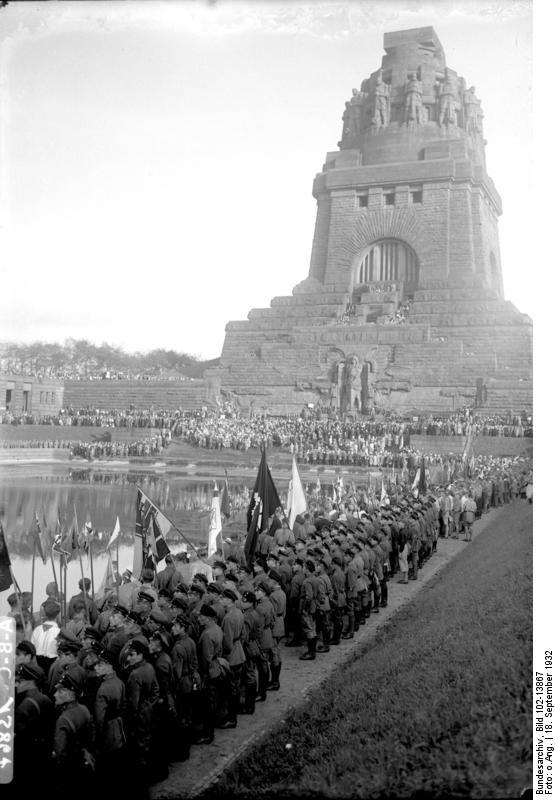
The centenary event of the Gustav-Adolf-Verein on 18 September 1932

During the interwar period of the Weimar Republic, the monument was still controlled by the Association of German Patriots, who restricted who was allowed to use it and how. Ideologically, the Association was most closely linked with the German People's Party, and both institutions held a common October celebration at the monument on the anniversary of the Battle of Leipzig. In the years after World War I, the monument was commonly used for remembrance events for fallen of the conflict as well as events focused on the territorial losses suffered by Germany with the Treaty of Versailles. The Association thereby closely associated the monument with nationalistic tendencies within the Republic. On 27 April 1924 for instance, the Association of German Patriots hosted a celebration for the 40th anniversary of the foundation of the now lost German overseas colonies. Alongside the annual celebration surrounding the anniversary on the Battle of Leipzig, in October 1925, the monument hosted the first German Reichskriegertag (Imperial Day of the Warrior), celebrating German veterans and the fallen soldiers of the World War. The last big event during the Weimar years came from 18 to 20 September 1932, when the Gustav-Adolf-Verein, a society under the Evangelical Church in Germany, celebrated its one-hundredth anniversary with participation of right-wing organisations such as the Nazi Party's Sturmabteilung (SA), the Stahlhelm and others. Steffen Poser described the monument in the interwar years as a site used mainly by institutions working against the democratic, republican system.

=== Nazi Germany and World War II ===
Following the rise of the Nazi Party to power and Adolf Hitler's appointment as Chancellor of Germany, the monument was quickly turned into a meeting ground meant to symbolise the völkisch (ethnic) unity of the nation and the subservience of the individual to the collective. On 16 July 1933, the Nazi Party held their first big rally at the monument, culminating in a speech by Hitler. On 10 June 1934, the now state party organised a rally in support of the Territory of the Saar Basin rejoining Germany in advance of the referendum held the following January. Just one week later, on 17 June 1934, the monument served as the site of a service attended by around 50,000 Christians, who under the lead of Ludwig Müller, Reichsbischof (bishop of the Reich), pledged allegiance to the Nazi movement.

The annual celebrations of the Battle of Leipzig continued under Nazi rule, now accompanied by representation of the army, police, and the SA. This included a large event for the 125th anniversary in 1938, which was advertised with a weeks-long advertisement campaign that drew a direct line between the Napoleonic Wars and National Socialism. One pamphlet read: "What fatefully began with the victory at Leipzig, ended in a bitter tragedy for the German People, over which the curtain was only drawn on 30 January 1933". (Note: 30 January 1933 was the day on which Adolf Hitler was appointed Chancellor.) Following the outbreak of World War II and in particular after the German war effort turned towards defeat in 1943, the annual celebrations became smaller and more muted. On Christmas Day 1943, the monument was for the first time used to mourn civilian deaths, as the citizens of Leipzig gathered to remember the victims of the bombing of the city on 4 December 1943. In 1944, the celebration of the anniversary of the Battle of Leipzig was called off altogether, as the Allied forces advanced on Germany.

During the war, an anti-aircraft gun (Flak) position was established on top of the monument. When the US Army captured Leipzig on April 18, 1945, the monument was the last stronghold in the city to surrender. 300 soldiers, men of the Volkssturm and boys of the Hitler Youth under the command of Oberst Hans von Poncet, were holding out in the monument, but after a direct artillery hit inside the structure, von Poncet was convinced to surrender following long negotiations.

=== Under Communist rule (1945–1989) ===
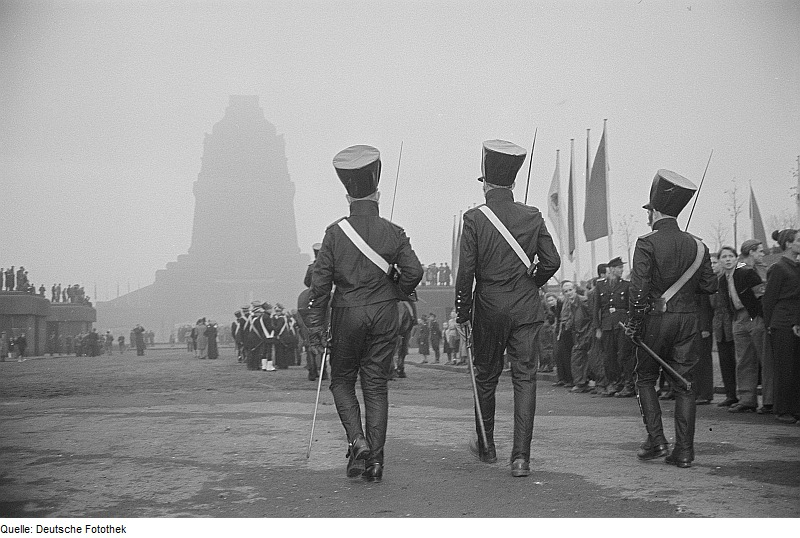
Historic reenactment of the Battle of Leipzig in the shadow of the monument in 1953

After World War II during the time of the separation of Germany, Leipzig was part of the Socialist German Democratic Republic, or East Germany. The ruling party, the Sozialistische Einheitspartei Deutschlands (SED), quickly moved to change the monument's symbolism: the East German state was pictured as the continuation of a free, unified Germany while Konrad Adenauer's policy of alignment with the Western Allies in West Germany was likened to the Confederation of the Rhine's "betrayal" of Germany during the Napoleonic Era. In May 1952, East German leader Walter Ulbricht declared that "the victory over Napoleon was made possible [...] 1. through the organisation of a people's army [...] 2. through German-Russian alliance in arms", thereby drawing a connection to East Germany's alignment with the USSR.

In 1953, the East German government hosted a large celebration of the 140th anniversary of the Battle of Leipzig, at the cost of 680,000 East German marks. Thousands of people assembled in Leipzig, leading parades through the city towards the monument. Equally, ten years later, in 1963, the anniversary was marked with a big event, joined by regiments of the Soviet army, highlighting the propaganda value of the monument and the Battle of Leipzig for a German-Russian alliance. Additional events were held at the monument, such as a celebration of the October Revolution on 15 October 1967, attended by around 60,000 people. For the 160th anniversary of the Battle of Leipzig in 1973, the exhibition housed within the monument was amended, now emphasising the aspect of German-Russian collaboration even further. Around the same time, the aspect of German unity lost importance, as a two-state solution was preferred under the new leadership of Erich Honecker. Towards the end of the 1980s, the monument more and more lost its character as a political site, as more entertainment-focused events were held, such as athletic competitions and concerts. During the last major anniversary of the Battle of Leipzig in 1988, the focus of the event, attended by around 100,000 people, was on the horrors of war and the need for peace.

=== The monument since 1989 ===
Following the Peaceful Revolution and German reunification in 1989 and 1990, the monument has largely lost its character as a site for political and historic events and now serves mainly as a tourist attraction and cultural event location, and as a recreational spot for the local population. In the local slang, the name Völkerschlachtdenkmal is often abbreviated as Völki.

== Restoration ==
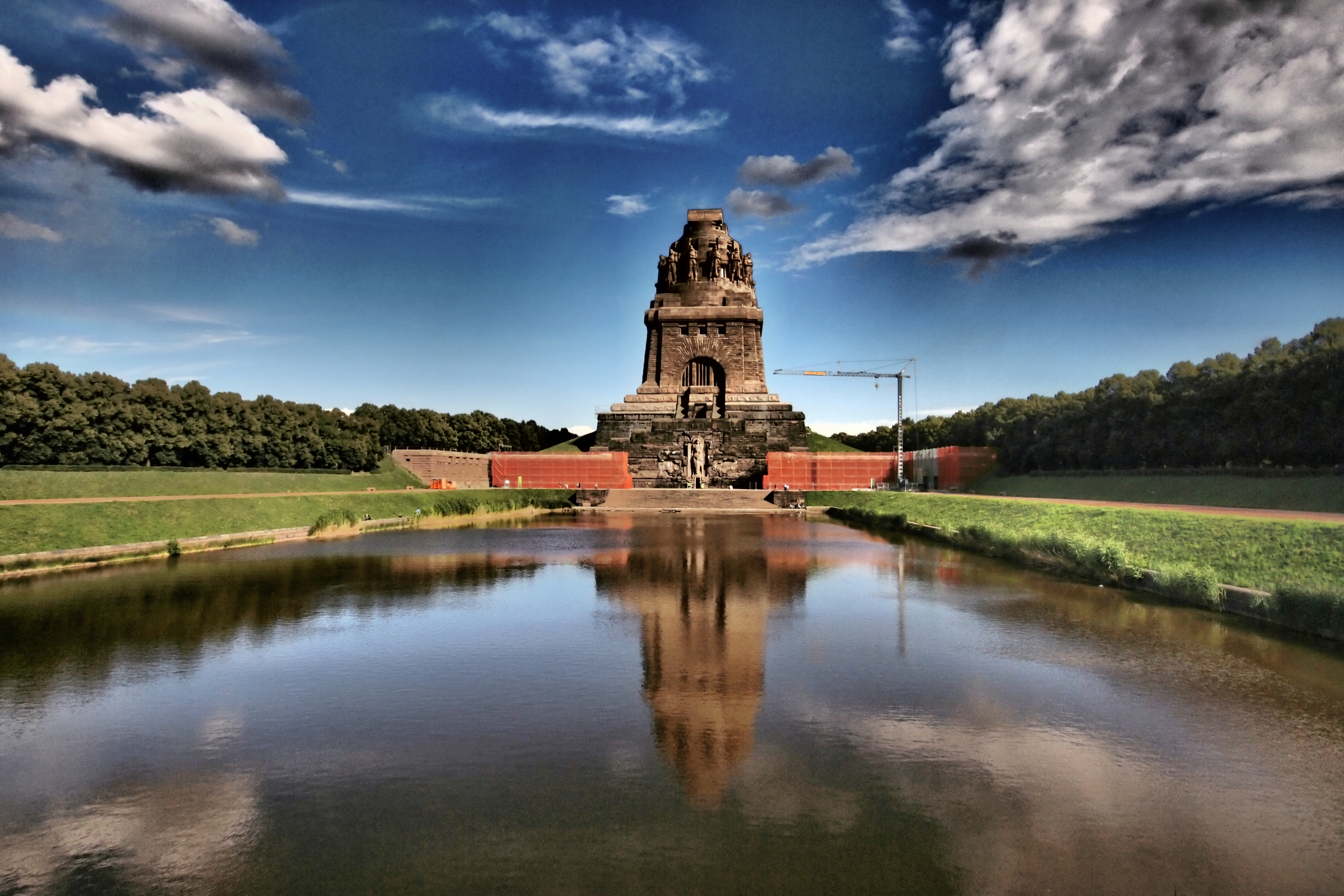
The monument during restoration (2011)

Within a year of the monument's completion, it became apparent that water penetrating the joints between the natural stone ashlars and the concrete core was a problem. Some stone pieces had moved significantly by ice and frost, while water entering the core had no way to escape, as dampening technology was not available for decades after the construction had finished. As an effect, stairs and pathways became crooked. Moreover, shelling by U.S. troops at the end of the war had left damage to the rear side of the monument not addressed during the time of Communist rule. In addition, the effects of nature and pollution had blackened the outside of the structure significantly. Until the 1990s, no significant efforts were made to renovate the monument. In 2003, with funding available, such measures finally started, with a target completion end date of 2013, the 200th anniversary of the battle. The black discolouring of the façade was gradually removed. The pavement in front of the monument was relaid, while a large shell hole dating from World War II was patched up. Not all war damage was removed however, deliberately leaving open some signs of bullets and shell splinters as a reminder. A new drainage system was integrated into the structure to safeguard the building from future water damage. The monument was also made wheel-chair accessible for the first time through the addition of a lift. While some work could not be finished until 2013, the work on the exterior reflection pool was finished in 2018. Additional restoration was completed as of 2019.

== See also ==
- Bridge blasting monument
- Kyffhäuser Monument
- Voortrekker Monument in Pretoria, South Africa, inspired by the Monument to the Battle of the Nations
- Centennial Hall in Wrocław (Breslau)

== Bibliography ==
- Clark, Christopher (1996). "The Wars of Liberation in Prussian Memory: Reflections on the Memorialization of War in Early Nineteenth-Century Germany". The Journal of Modern History. 68 (3): 550–576. doi:10.1086/245342. JSTOR 2946767. S2CID 143695987.
- Dmitrieva, Marina; Karl, Lars, eds. (2016). Das Jahr 1813, Ostmitteleuropa und Leipzig. Die Völkerschlacht als (trans)nationaler Erinnerungsort [The Year 1813, East Central Europe and Leipzig. The Battle of the Nations as a (trans)national place of remembrance] (in German). Cologne: Böhlau Verlag. ISBN 978-3-412-50399-4.
  - Bartetzky, Arnold. "Befreiungskriege und Völkerschlacht in der visuellen Erinnerungskultur des Deutschen Kaiserreichs". In Dmitrieva & Karl (2016), pp. 123–134.
  - Topfstedt, Thomas. "Das Leipziger Völkerschlachtsdenkmal: Eine kurze Ideen- und Baugeschichte". In Dmitrieva & Karl (2016), pp. 137–155.
- Hoffmann, Stefan-Ludwig (2007). The Politics of Sociability: Freemasonry and German Civil Society, 1840–1918. University of Michigan Press. ISBN 978-0-472-11573-0.
- Johnson, Molly Wilkinson (2008). Training Socialist Citizens: Sports and the State in East Germany. Studies in Central European Histories. Vol. 44. Brill. ISBN 9789004169579.
- Kamusella, Tomasz (2007). Silesia and Central European Nationalisms: The Emergence of National and Ethnic Groups in Prussian Silesia and Austrian Silesia, 1848-1918. Purdue University Press. ISBN 978-1-55753-371-5.
- Keller, Katrin; Schmid, Hans-Dieter, eds. (1995). Vom Kult zur Kulisse [The cult of scenery] (in German). Leipziger Universitätsverlag. ISBN 978-3-929031-60-7.
  - Poser, Steffen. "Zur Rezeptionsgeschichte des Völkerschlachtsdenkmals zwischen 1914 und 1989". In Keller & Schmid (1995), pp. 78–104.
- Koshar, Rudy (2000). From Monuments to Traces: Artifacts of German Memory, 1870-1990. University of California Press. ISBN 978-0-520-21768-3.
- Michalski, Sergiusz (1998). Public Monuments: Art in Political Bondage, 1870-1997. London: Reaktion Books. ISBN 9781861890252.
- Platthaus, Andreas (2015). 1813: Die Völkerschlacht und das Ende der Alten Welt [1813: The Battle of the Nations and the End of the Old World] (in German). Reinbek bei Hamburg: Rowohlt Taschenbuch Verlag. ISBN 978-3-499-62922-8.
- Pohlsander, Hans (2008). National Monuments and Nationalism in 19th Century Germany. New German-American Studies. Peter Lang. ISBN 978-3-03911-352-1.
- Poser, Steffen (2014). Monument to the Battle of the Nations: Short Guide. Leipzig: Passage-Verlag. ISBN 978-3-938543-73-3.
- Sembach, Klaus-Jürgen (2002). Art Nouveau. Taschen. ISBN 978-3-8228-2022-3.
- Tebbe, Jason (2010). "Revision and "Rebirth": Commemoration of the Battle of Nations in Leipzig". German Studies Review. 33 (3): 618–640. JSTOR 20787996.
- Thamer, Hans-Ulrich (2013). Die Völkerschlacht bei Leipzig: Europas Kampf gegen Napoleon [The Battle of the Nations at Leipzig: Europe's Battle Against Napoleon] (in German). Munich: C.H. Beck. ISBN 978-3-406-64610-2.
