= Kiełczów =

- Village
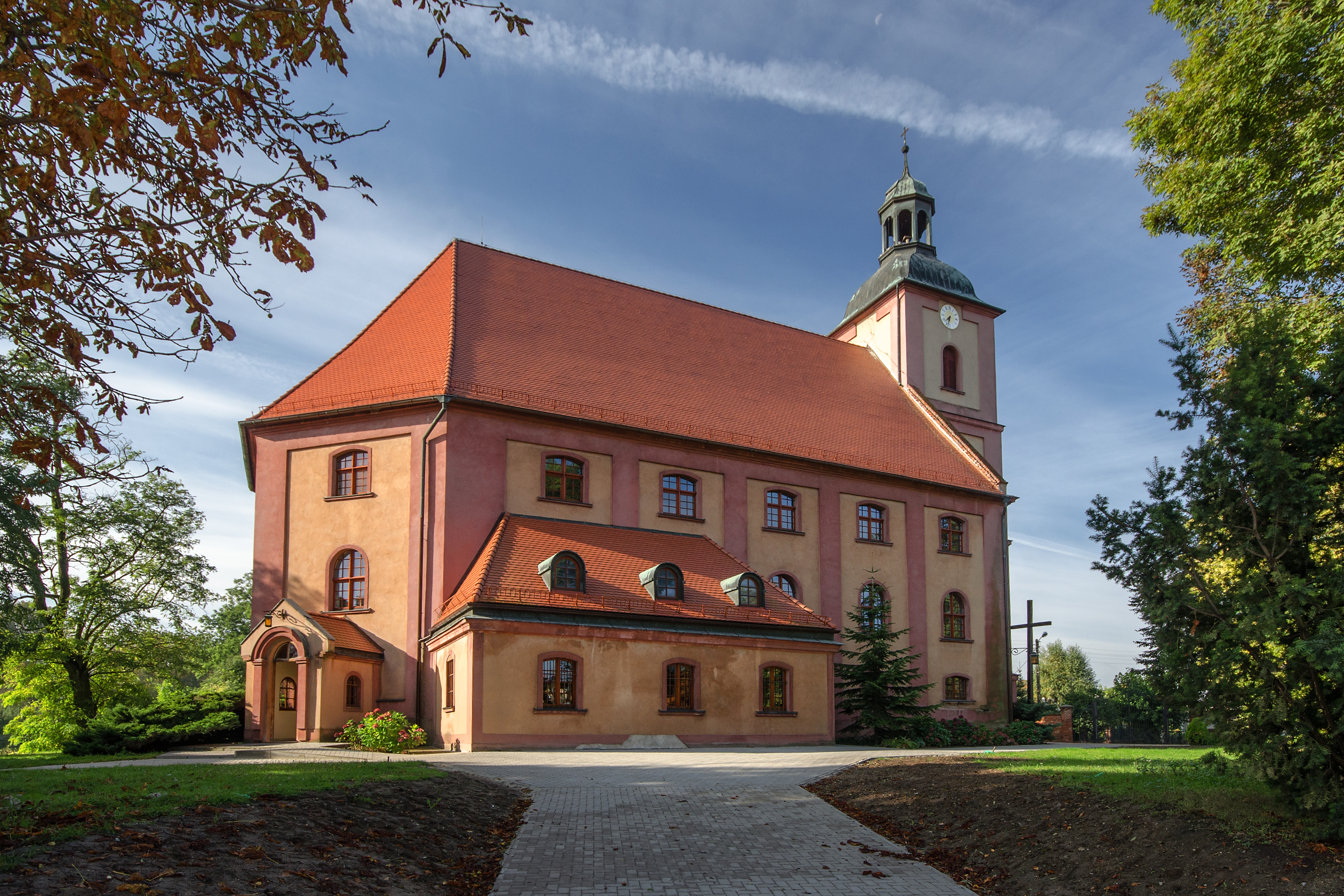
- Our Lady of the Rosary church in Kiełczów

- Location within Poland
- Coordinates: 51°08′26″N 17°10′42″E
- Country: Poland
- Voivodeship: Lower Silesian
- County: Wrocław
- Gmina: Długołęka
- Time zone: UTC+1 (CET)
  - Summer (DST): UTC+2 (CEST)
- Postal code: 55-093
- Vehicle registration: DWR
- Website: https://kielczow.org/

Kiełczów ([ˈkʲɛu̯t͡ʂuf]) is a village in the administrative district of Gmina Długołęka, within Wrocław County, Lower Silesian Voivodeship, in south-western Poland. It is part of the Wrocław metropolitan area.

== History ==
Since the Middle Ages, the village was part of Poland, Bohemia, Hungary, Austria, Prussia and Germany, before becoming again part of Poland after World War II in 1945.

On February 14, 1874, the Amtsbezirk Groß Weigelsdorf – district-District of Kiełczów was created, comprising the villages of Kiełczów, Kiełczówek, Mirków and probably Kamień, as well as the land estates of Kiełczów, Kiełczówek and Kamień. Gutspächter Steiner became the administrator of the newly created district, and Waschke on December 3, 1880.

Currently, Kiełczów is the largest village in Długołęka County, with a population of 10,572 (as of 2021).

== Landmarks ==
Kiełczów's only registered landmark is the evangelical, currently roman catholic, Our Lady of the Rosary church. The current church was constructed sometime during 1790–1792, consecrated in 1792, and converted to its current denomination in 1945.

== Education and Culture ==
- Preschool in Kiełczów, schooling children aged 3–6.
- Wanda Chotomska primary school, educating students in grades I–VIII. It has existed since the 1950s, and was named in 2009.
- Municipal Public Library in Długołęka, Kiełczów branch. Current location opened in 2023.
