= Ramasamy =

Ramasamy இராமசாமி
- Romanisation: Irāmacāmi
- Gender: Male
- Language: Tamil

Origin
- Region of origin: Southern India; North-eastern Sri Lanka

Other names
- Alternative spelling: Ramassamy; Ramaswamy; Ramaswami

Ramasamy (Tamil: இராமசாமி, romanized: Irāmacāmi) is a Tamil male given name. Due to the Tamil tradition of using patronymic surnames, it may also be a surname for males and females.

== Notable people ==
=== Politicians ===
- Albert Ramassamy (1923–2018), Indian-French politician from Réunion
- Nadia Ramassamy (born 1961), Indian-French politician from Réunion
- Ramaswamy Venkataraman (1910–2009), president of India from 1987 to 1992
- M. D. Ramasami, Indian politician, MLA from Aruppukottai
- S. S. Ramasami Padayatchiyar (1918–1992), Indian politician from Tamil Nadu
- Ramasamy Doss, Indian politician, MLA from Kovilpatti
- K. Ramasamy (politician), Indian politician, MLA from Sivakasi
- Periyar E. V. Ramasamy (1879–1973), Indian social activist and founder of Dravidar Kazhagam
- Best Ramasamy (born 1946), Indian politician, president of the Kongunadu Munnetra Kazhagam party
- Ramasamy Palanisamy (born 1949), Malaysian politician, Deputy Chief Minister of Penang
- S. N. Ramasamy, Indian politician, MLA from Sathankulam
- T. Ramasamy, Indian politician, MLA from Srivilliputhur
- K. S. Ramaswamy (1922–2004), Indian politician, MP from Gobichettipalayam
- S. J. Ramaswamy Mudali, Gobichettipalayam, MLA from Arakkonam
- Arcot Ramasamy Mudaliar (1887–1976), Indian politician, diwan of Mysore, Justice Party leader
- V. V. Ramasamy Nadar, Indian politician from Virudhunagar
- S. Ramaswamy Naidu (1901–1969), Indian Swatantra Party politician from Sivakasi
- P. Ramasamy Pillai, Indian politician, MLA from Thiruvattar
- T. S. Ramasamy Pillai (1918–2006), Indian independence activist, MLA from Kanyakumari
- Vivek Ramaswamy (born 1985), American businessman, presidential candidate

=== Others ===
- Aarthie Ramaswamy (born 1981), Indian chess player
- Bhuvaneswari Ramaswamy, American oncologist and hematologist
- Cotah Ramaswami (1896–1990), Indian athlete
- N. S. Ramaswami (1918–1987), Indian sports journalist and historian
- Cho Ramaswamy (1934–2016), Indian comedian, politician and journalist
- M. A. M. Ramaswamy (1931–2015), Indian businessman and Janata Dal politician from Karnataka
- Mythily Ramaswamy (born 1954), Indian mathematician
- Shabnam Ramaswamy, Indian interior designer and social worker
- Traffic Ramaswamy (1934–2021), Indian social activist from Chennai
- T. Ramaswamy Choudary (1887–1943), Indian lawyer and playwright
- V. K. Ramasamy (actor) (1926–2002), Indian actor, comedian, and film producer in Tamil cinema
- V. K. Ramaswamy (umpire) (born 1945), Indian test cricket umpire
- Gorur Ramaswamy Iyengar (1904–1991), Indian writer
- Ramaswamy S (born 1964), Indian-American biologist
- Ramaswamy S. Vaidyanathaswamy (1894–1960), Indian mathematician, Professor of Mathematics in University of Madras
- Rathakrishnan Ramasamy (born 1965), Singaporean juvenile offender
- Gunasegaran Ramasamy (born 1985), Singaporean convicted robber
- Nelly Ramassamy (born 1983), Indian-French gymnast
