= Wrocław metropolitan area =

Wrocław metropolitan area Aglomeracja wrocławska Wrocław agglomeration
- Urban area
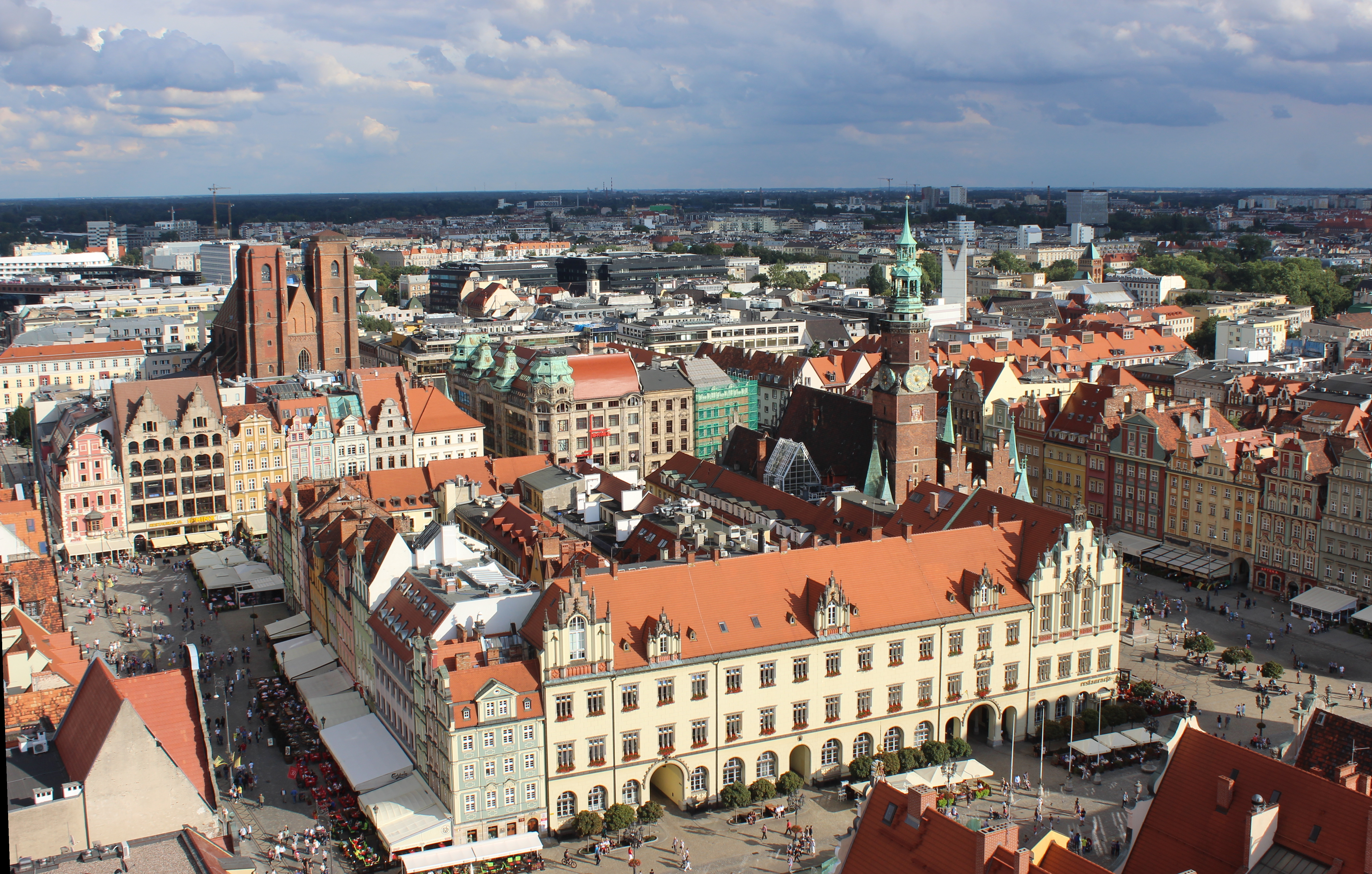
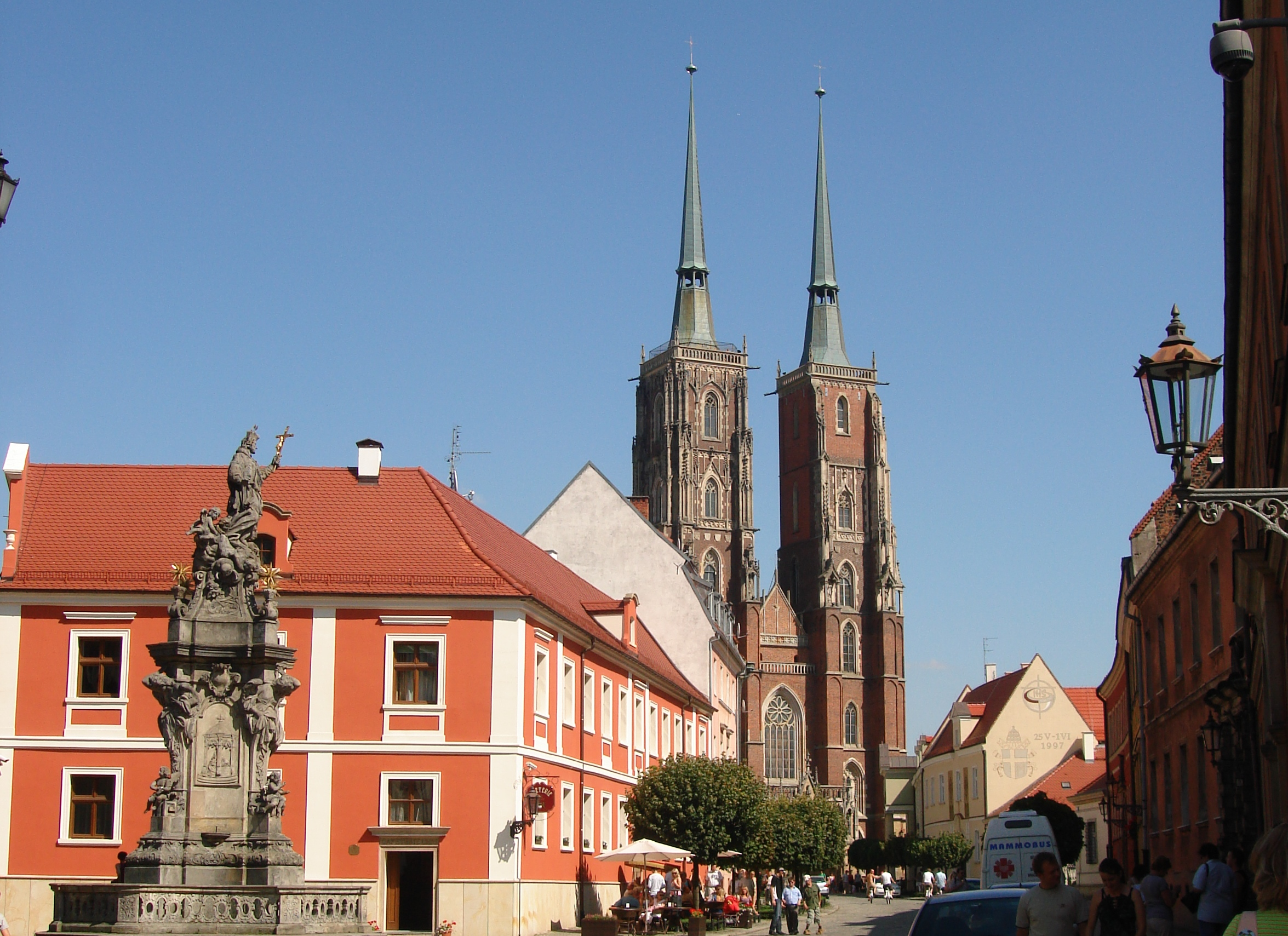
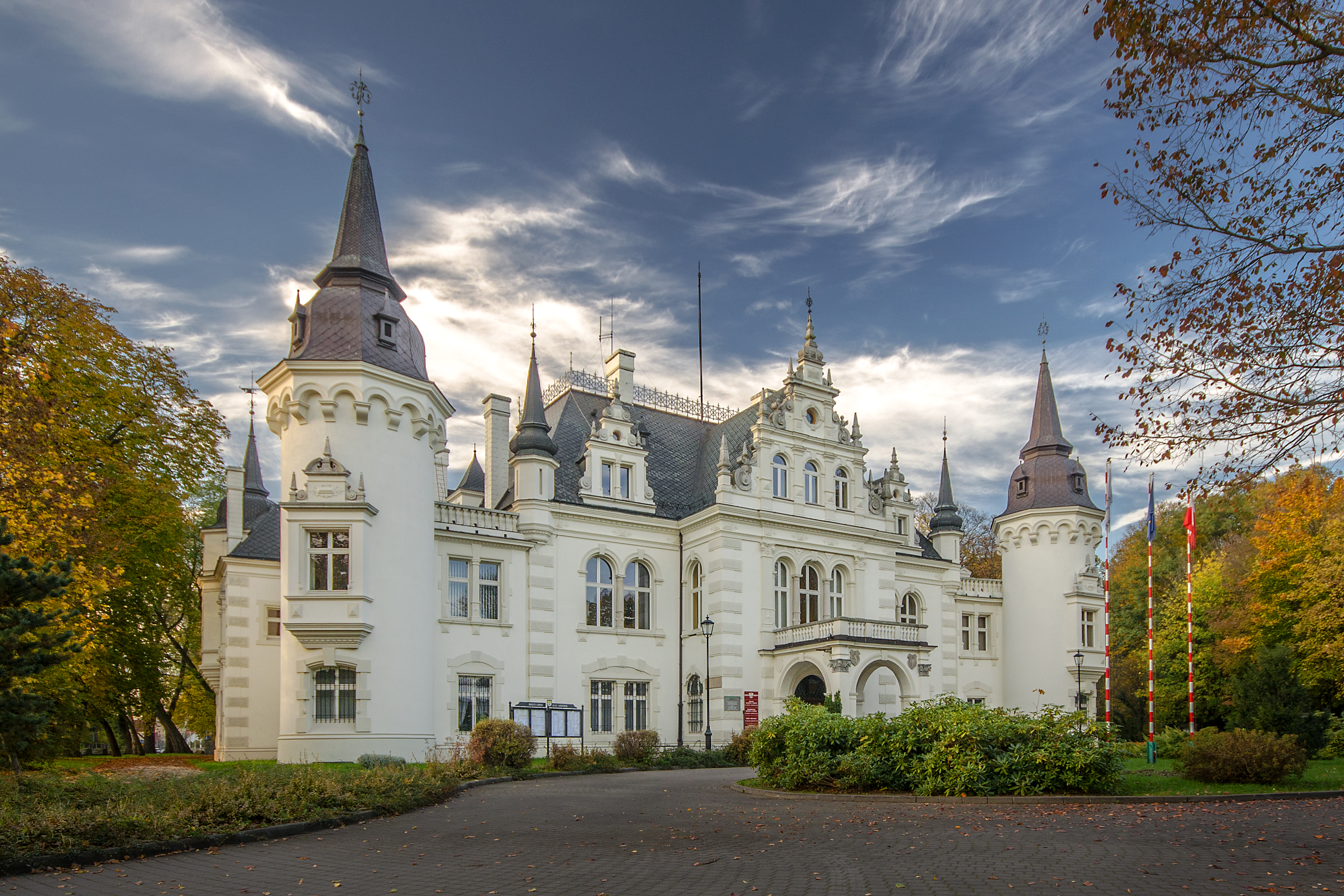
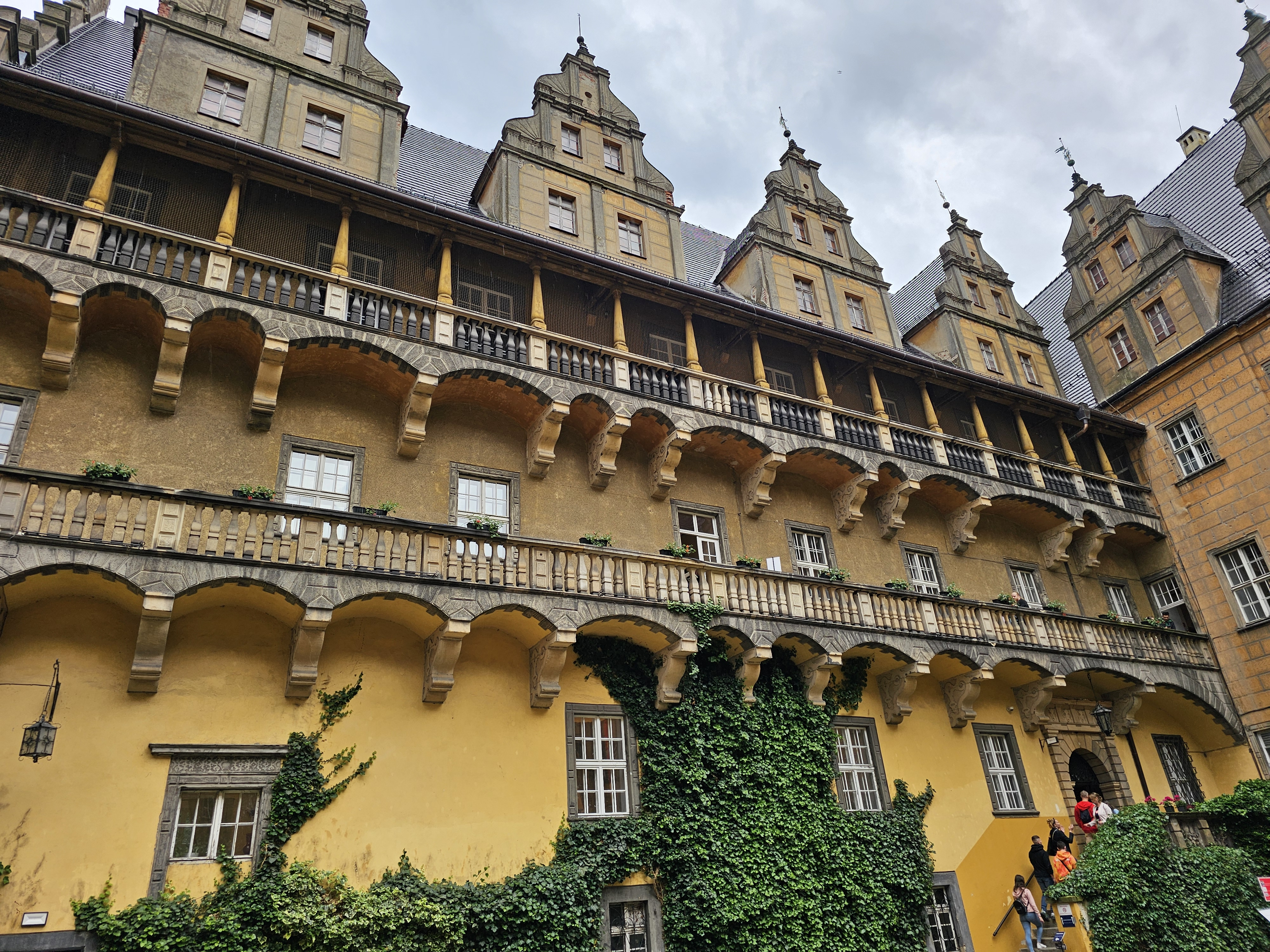
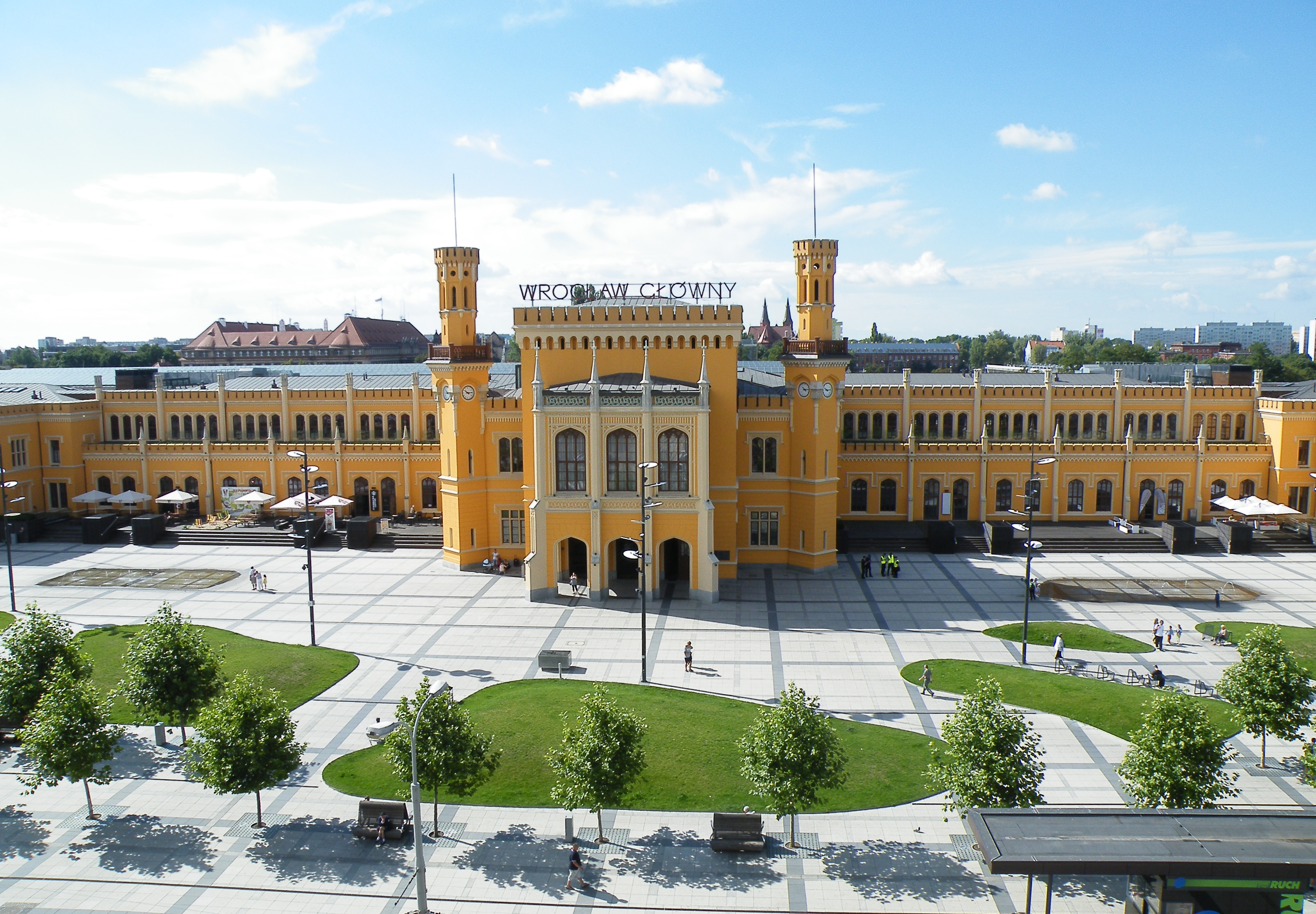
- From top, left to right: Wrocław Old Town; Cathedral Island with the Wrocław Cathedral; Palace in Jelcz-Laskowice; Renaissance castle in Oleśnica; Wrocław Główny railway station

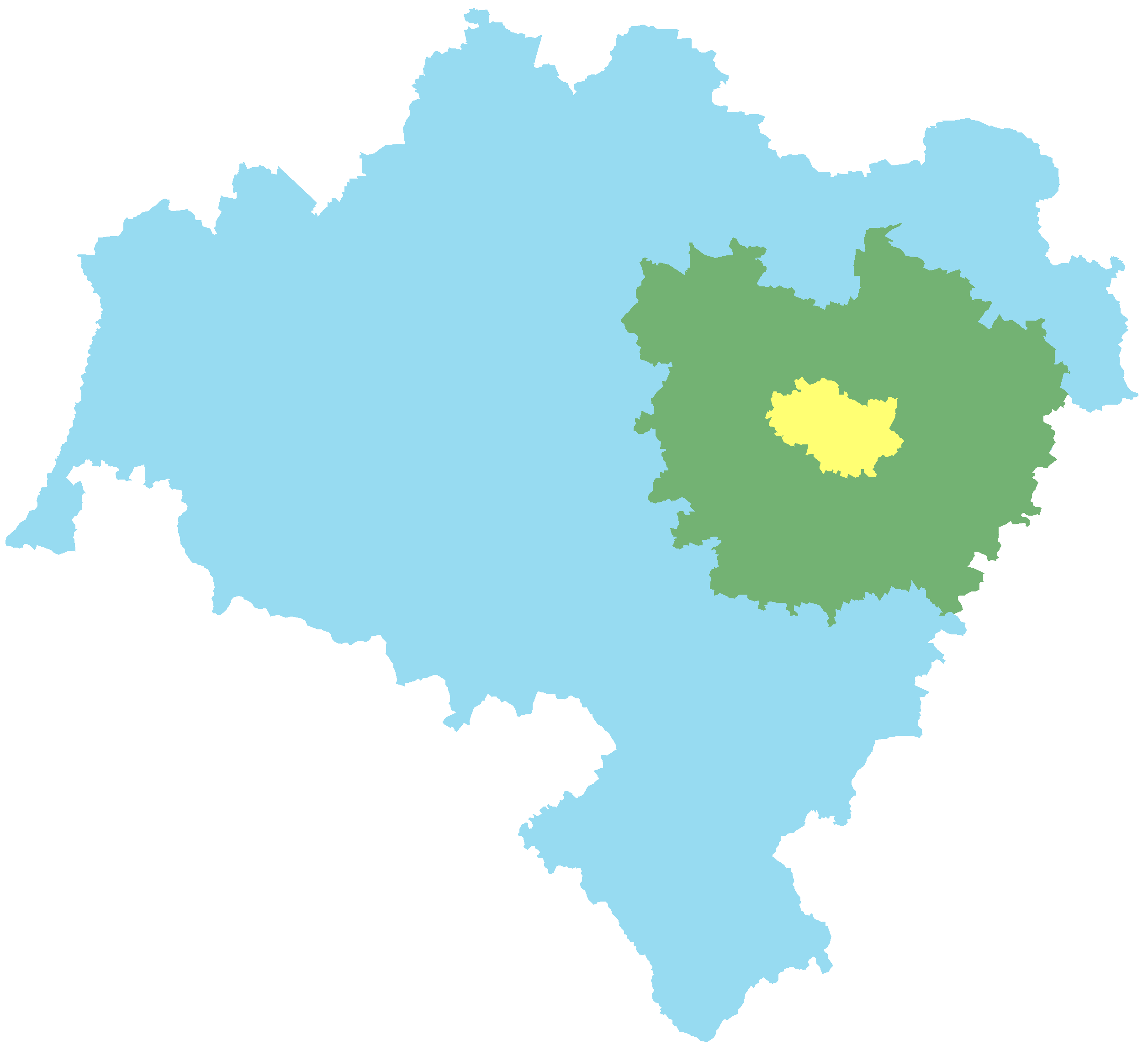
- Wrocław metropolitan area in green, while city core in yellow

- Location within Poland
- Coordinates: 51°06′28″N 17°02′19″E
- Country: Poland
- Voivodeship: Lower Silesian

Area
  - Metro: 3,627 km^{2} (1,400 sq mi)

Population
  - Metro: 1,250,000
  - Metro density: 345/km^{2} (893/sq mi)

GDP
  - Metro: €16.579 billion (2021)
- Time zone: UTC+1 (CET)
  - Summer (DST): UTC+2 (CEST)
- Primary airport: Wrocław Airport
- Website: aglomeracja.wroclaw.pl

The Wrocław metropolitan area is a monocentric agglomeration in the south-western part of Poland, in the Lower Silesian Voivodship, consisting of the city of Wrocław and its satellite towns. The population living in the agglomeration is about 1.25 million people.

In the case of the Wrocław agglomeration, its area is not strongly urbanized in its entirety. The agglomeration is defined as an area that is economically and geographically linked to Wrocław.

== Cities and towns ==
Data from GUS, with population included (30.06.2023)

- Wrocław – 674,132
- Oleśnica – 35,210
- Oława – 33,183
- Jelcz-Laskowice – 15,088
- Trzebnica – 13,624
- Brzeg Dolny – 12,565
- Wołów – 12,043
- Strzelin – 11,956
- Siechnice – 10,797
- Milicz 10,785
- Kiełczów – 10,569
- Syców – 9,928
- Środa Śląska – 9,548
- Oborniki Śląskie – 8,992
- Kąty Wrocławskie – 7,171
- Sobótka – 6,997
- Twardogóra – 6,207
- Żmigród – 6,205
- Smolec – 5,384
- Bielany Wrocławskie – 4,495
- Bierutów – 4,481
- Długołęka – 4,127

== Development Agency ==
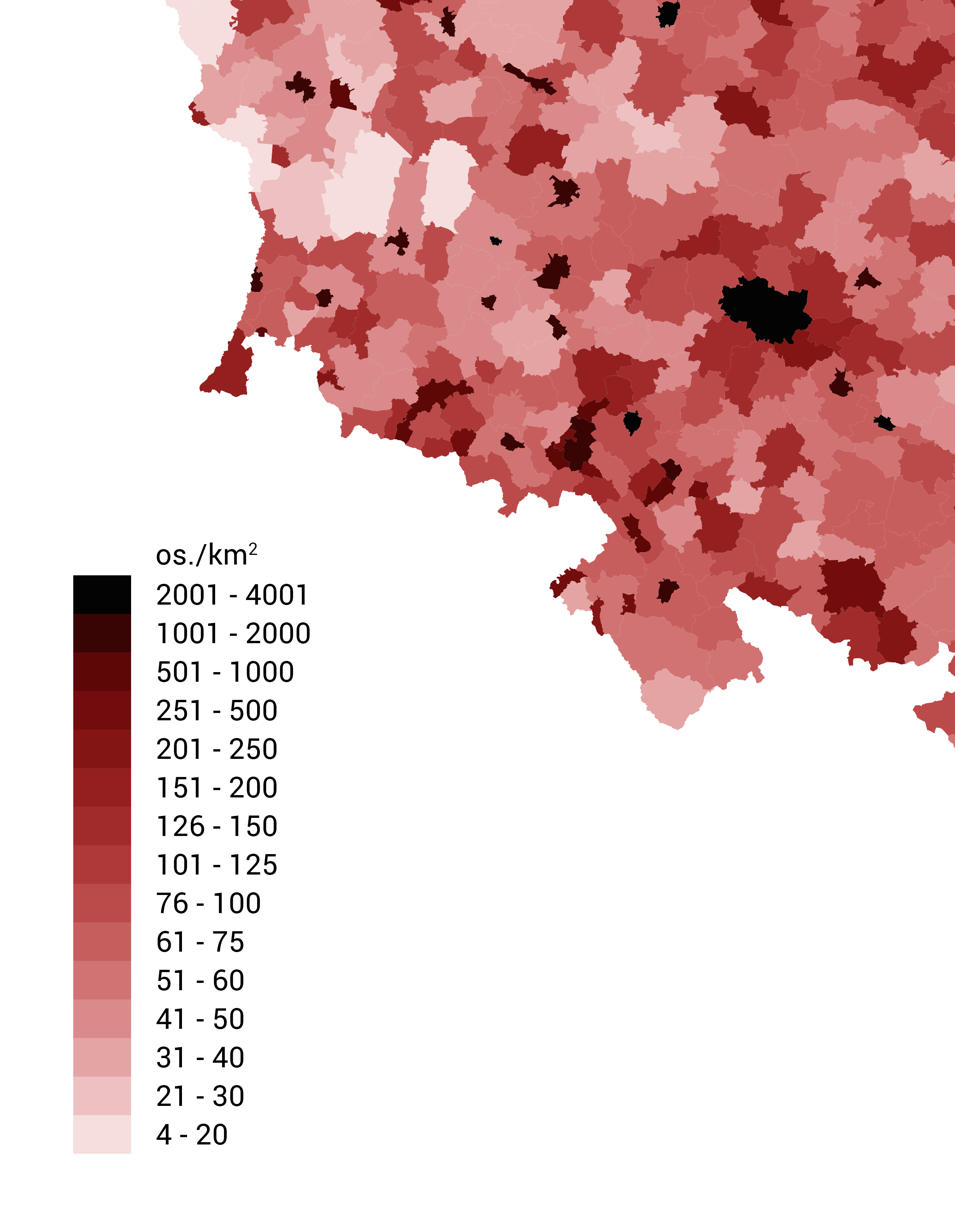
Population density per gmina in Southern Poland, 2016

In 2005, the city of Wroclaw and seven municipalities set up a company called Agencja Rozwoju Aglomeracji Wrocławskiej SA (ARAW, Wroclaw Agglomeration Development Agency). At present, its shareholders include 30 municipalities from the districts:

Wroclaw Agglomeration Development Agency logo

- Wrocław County
  - Czernica
  - Długołęka
  - Kąty Wrocławskie
  - Kobierzyce
  - Siechnice
  - Wrocław
  - Żórawina
- Trzebnica County
  - Oborniki Śląskie
  - Prusice
  - Trzebnica
  - Wisznia Mała
  - Żmigród
- Środa County
  - Kostomłoty
  - Malczyce
  - Miękinia
  - Środa Śląska
  - Udanin
- Strzelin County
  - Strzelin
- Oława County
  - Domaniów
  - Oława
  - Jelcz-Laskowice
- Oleśnica County
  - Dobroszyce
  - Oleśnica
  - Bierutów
  - Twardogóra
- Milicz County
  - Krośnice
  - Milicz
- Wołów County
  - Brzeg Dolny
  - Wołów
- Świdnica County
  - Świdnica

== Economy ==
In 2021 Wrocław's gross metropolitan product was €15.2 billion. This puts Wrocław in 165th place among cities in European Union.

== Wrocław Agglomeration Association ==
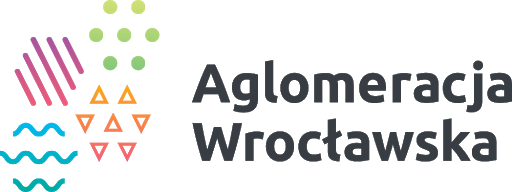
Wroclaw Agglomeration Association logo

In June 2013, Wroclaw Agglomeration Association was registered, which currently comprises 26 municipalities from the Wroclaw agglomeration area:

1. Bierutów
2. Borów
3. Brzeg Dolny
4. Czernica
5. Dziadowa Kłoda
6. Długołęka
7. Jelcz-Laskowice
8. Jordanów Śląski
9. Kąty Wrocławskie
10. Krośnice
11. Malczyce
12. Międzybórz
13. Prusice
14. Przeworno
15. Siechnice
16. Sobótka
17. Środa Śląska
18. Strzelin
19. Syców
20. Trzebnica
21. Wisznia Mała
22. Wołów
23. Wrocław
24. Zawonia
25. Żmigród

== Sports ==
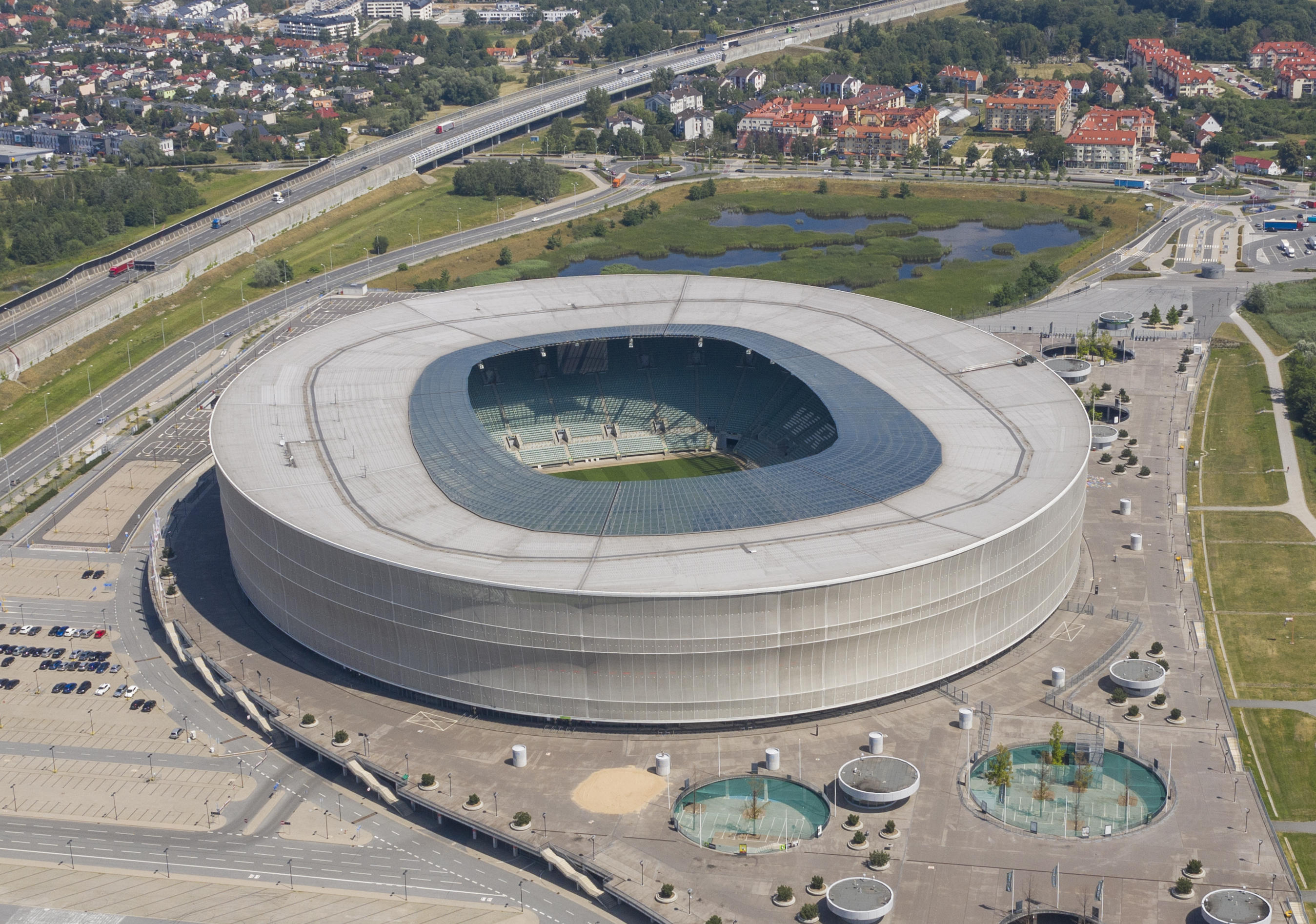
Wrocław Stadium, one of the arenas of the UEFA Euro 2012 and home venue of the Śląsk Wrocław football team

Professional sports teams
Club	Sport	League	Trophies
Śląsk Wrocław	Basketball (men's)	Polish Basketball League	18 Polish Championships; 14 Polish Cups
Ślęza Wrocław	Basketball (women's)	Basket Liga Kobiet	2 Polish Championships (1987, 2017)
Śląsk Wrocław	Handball (men's)	Liga Centralna (2nd tier)	15 Polish Championships; 7 Polish Cups
KPR Kobierzyce	Handball (women's)	Superliga	1 Polish Cup (2022)
Sparta Wrocław	Speedway	Ekstraliga	5 Polish Championships
Śląsk Wrocław	Football (men's)	Ekstraklasa	2 Polish Championships (1977, 2012); 2 Polish Cups (1976, 1987)
Śląsk Wrocław	Football (women's)	Ekstraliga	0
Gwardia Wrocław	Volleyball (men's)	I liga (2nd tier)	3 Polish Championships; 1 Polish Cup (1981)
Gwardia Wrocław	Volleyball (women's)	Tauron Liga	0
Panthers Wrocław	American football	European League of Football	4 Polish Championships
Jaguars Kąty Wrocławskie	American football	Polish Football League	0

== See also ==
- Metropolitan areas in Poland
- Lower Silesian Railways
