= Zaprężyn =

- Village
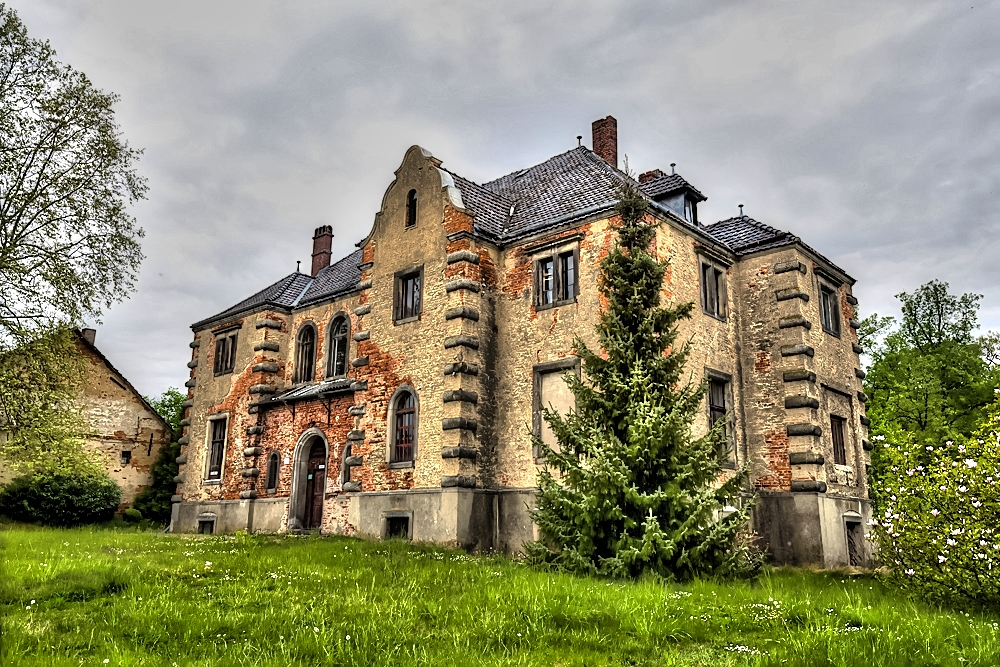
- Palace in Zaprężyn

- Location within Poland
- Coordinates: 51°15′N 17°12′E
- Country: Poland
- Voivodeship: Lower Silesian
- County: Wrocław
- Gmina: Długołęka
- Time zone: UTC+1 (CET)
  - Summer (DST): UTC+2 (CEST)
- Vehicle registration: DWR

Zaprężyn [zaˈprɛ̃ʐɨn] is a village in the administrative district of Gmina Długołęka, within Wrocław County, Lower Silesian Voivodeship, in south-western Poland.

== History ==
The area became part of the emerging Polish state in the 10th century. Centuries later it passed to Bohemia (Czechia), Prussia and Germany. In 1936, the Nazi government of Germany renamed it to Lindenhof to erase traces of Polish origin. In 1945, following Germany's defeat in World War II, the village became again part of Poland and its historic name was restored.
