= Borowa, Lower Silesian Voivodeship =

Borowa
- Village
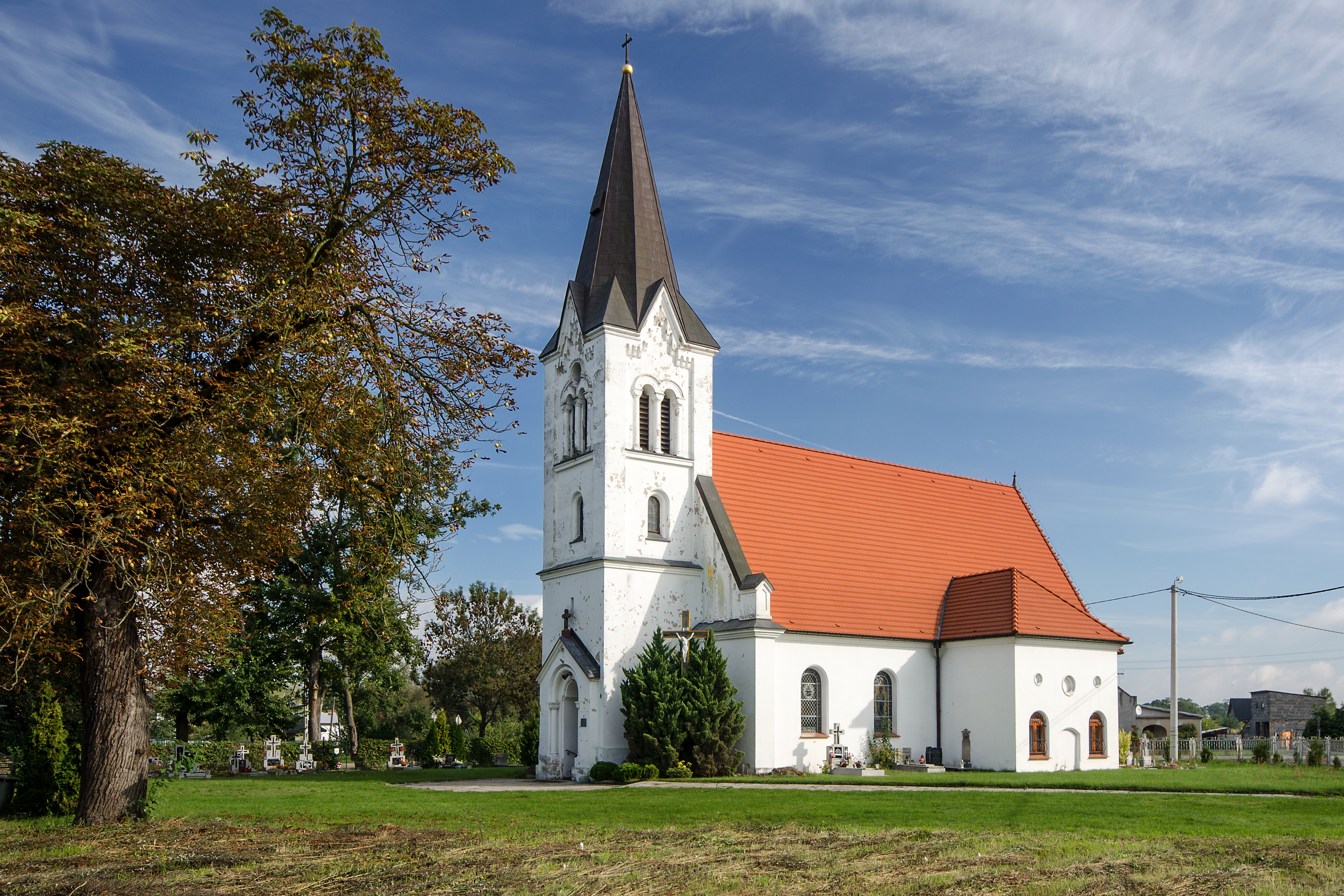

- Location within Poland
- Coordinates: 51°11′21″N 17°16′47″E
- Country: Poland
- Voivodeship: Lower Silesian
- County: Wrocław
- Gmina: Długołęka

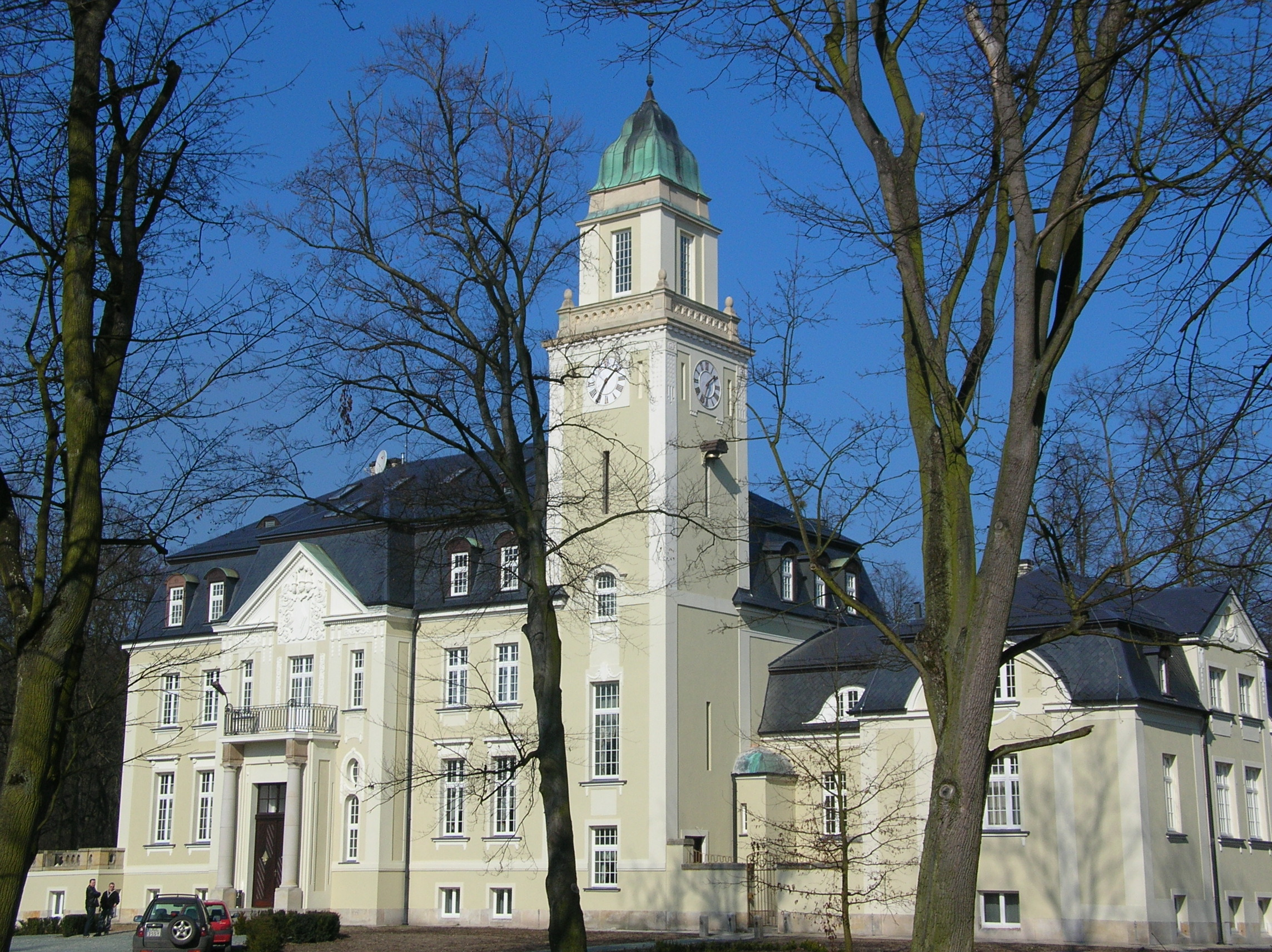
Palace in Borowa

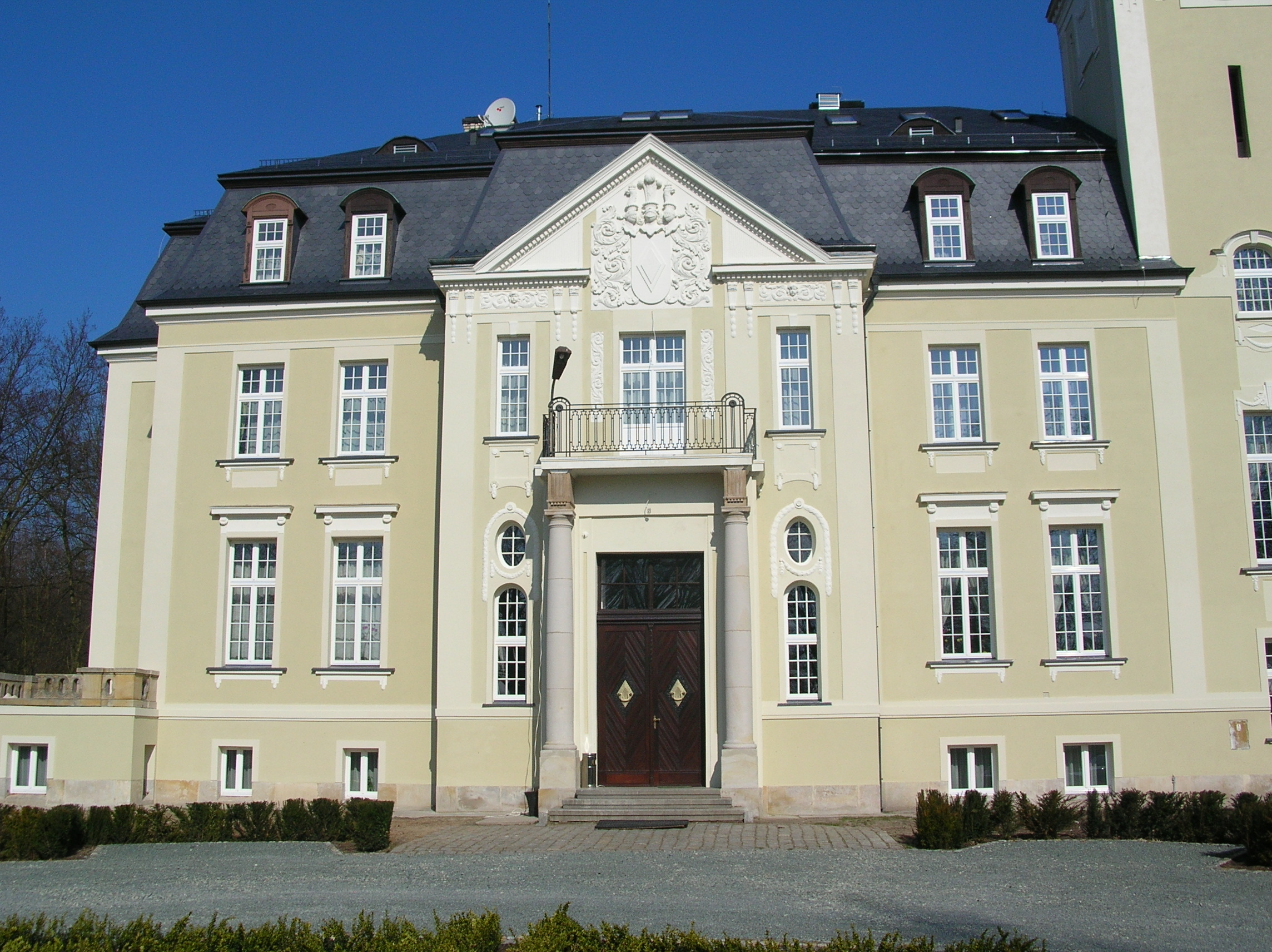
Palace in Borowa

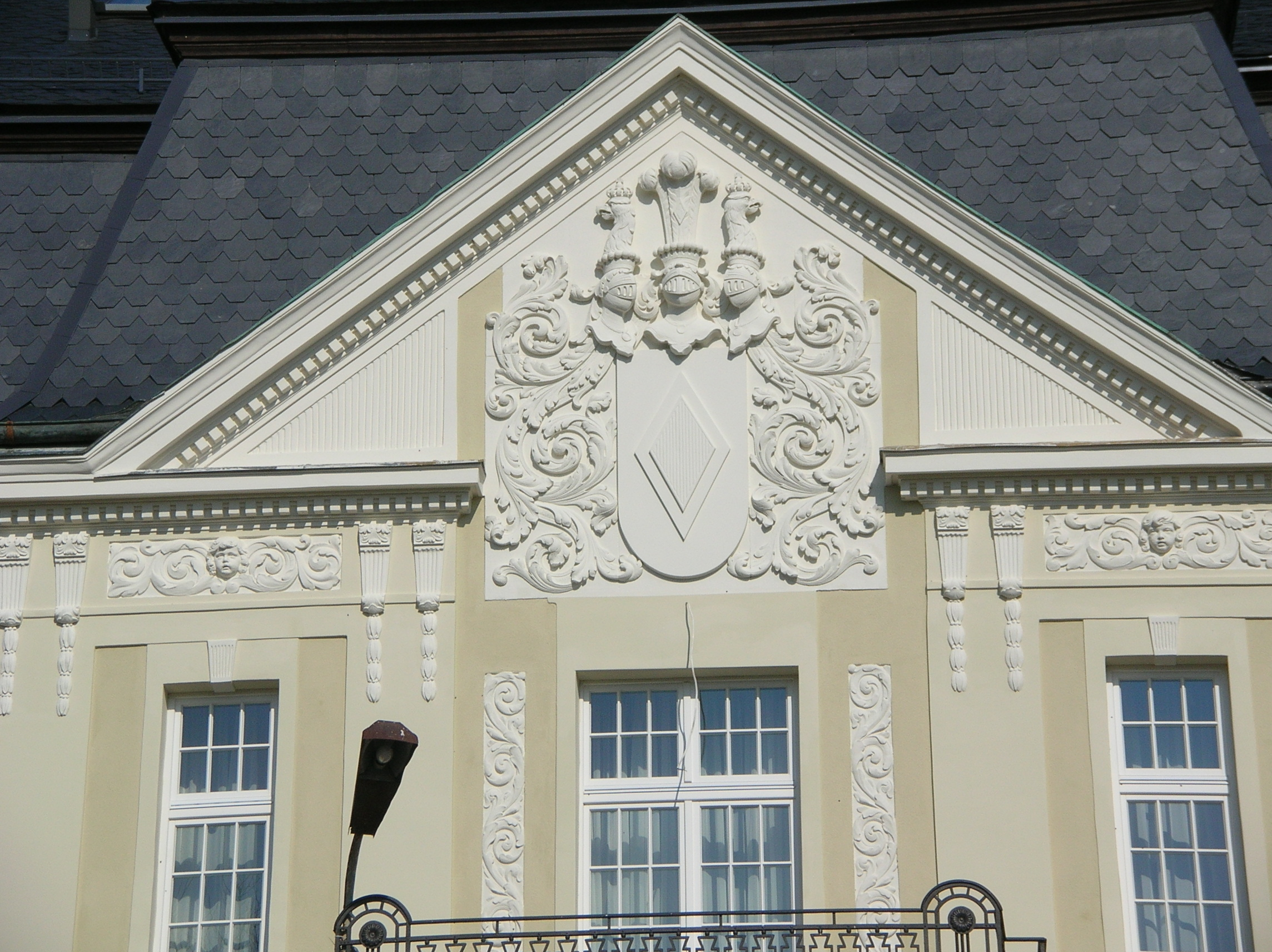
Palace in Borowa

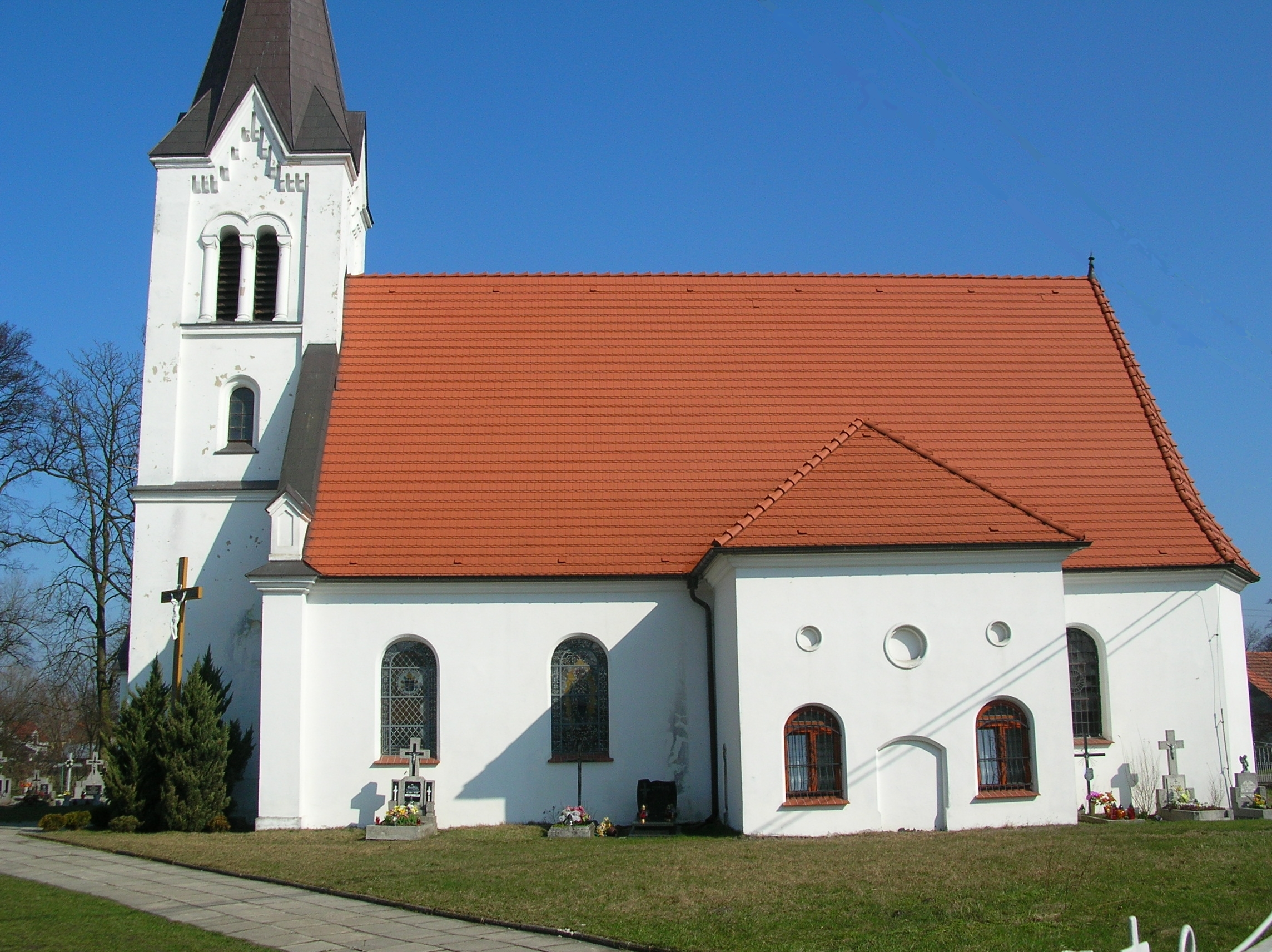
Church in Borowa

Borowa [bɔˈrɔva] is a village in the administrative district of Gmina Długołęka, within Wrocław County, Lower Silesian Voivodeship, in south-western Poland.
