= Bąków, Wrocław County =

Bąków
- Village
- Location within Poland
- Coordinates: 51°12′45″N 17°9′33″E
- Country: Poland
- Voivodeship: Lower Silesian
- County: Wrocław
- Gmina: Długołęka

Bąków [ˈbɔŋkuf] is a village in the administrative district of Gmina Długołęka, within Wrocław County, Lower Silesian Voivodeship, in south-western Poland.
