= Kępa, Lower Silesian Voivodeship =

Kępa
- Village
- Location within Poland
- Coordinates: 51°14′21″N 17°12′21″E
- Country: Poland
- Voivodeship: Lower Silesian
- County: Wrocław
- Gmina: Długołęka
- Population: 180

Kępa [ˈkɛmpa] is a village in the administrative district of Gmina Długołęka, within Wrocław County, Lower Silesian Voivodeship, in south-western Poland.
