= Ramiszów =

- Village
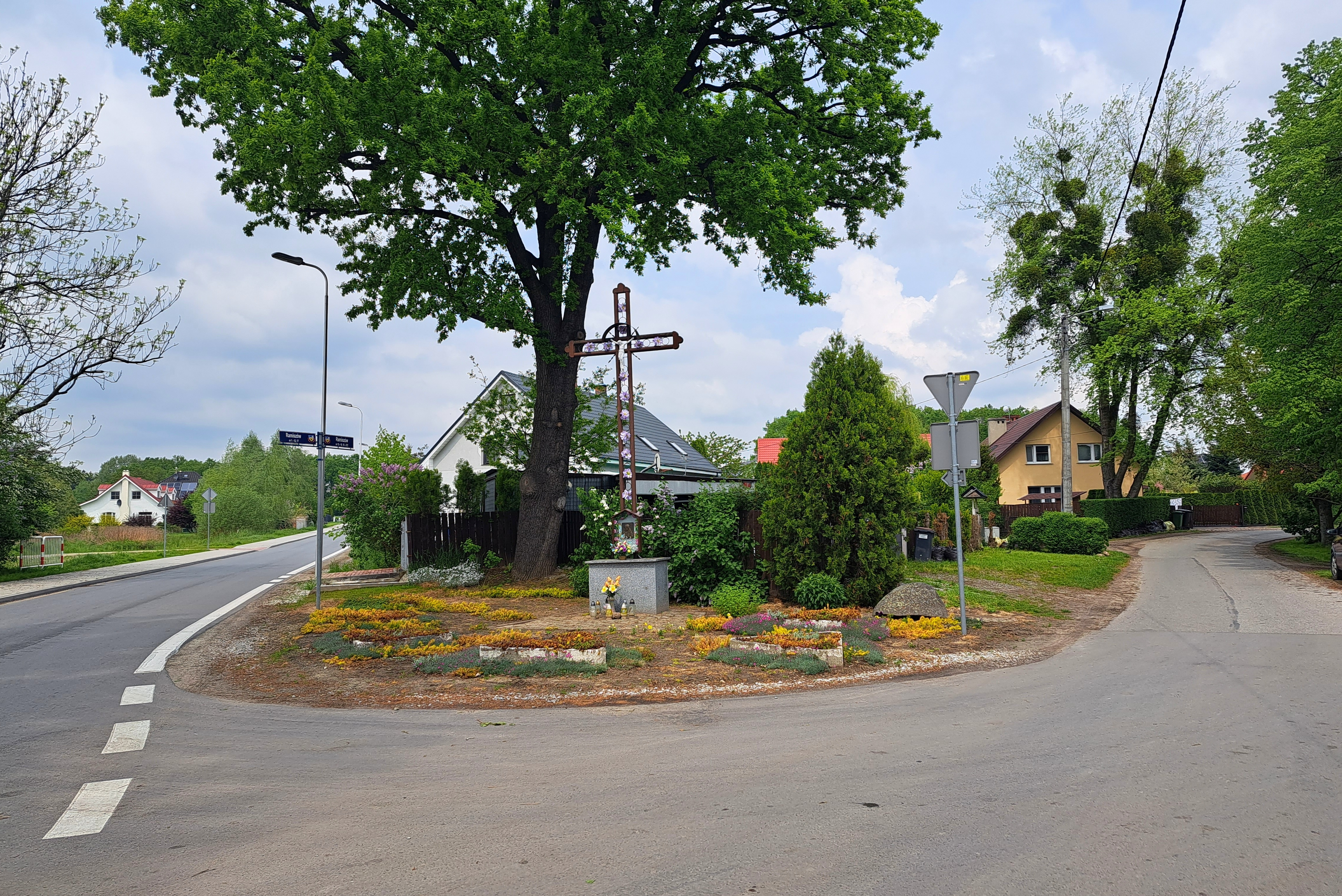

- Location within Poland
- Coordinates: 51°11′20″N 17°06′11″E
- Country: Poland
- Voivodeship: Lower Silesian
- County: Wrocław
- Gmina: Długołęka
- Population: 100

Ramiszów [raˈmiʂuf] is a village in the administrative district of Gmina Długołęka, within Wrocław County, Lower Silesian Voivodeship, in south-western Poland.
