= Michałowice, Gmina Długołęka =

Michałowice
- Village
- Location within Poland
- Coordinates: 51°13′55″N 17°12′54″E
- Country: Poland
- Voivodeship: Lower Silesian
- County: Wrocław
- Gmina: Długołęka
- Population: 130

Michałowice [mixawɔˈvit͡sɛ] is a village in the administrative district of Gmina Długołęka, within Wrocław County, Lower Silesian Voivodeship, in south-western Poland.
