= Skała, Wrocław County =

Skała
- Village
- Location within Poland
- Coordinates: 51°15′38″N 17°14′9″E
- Country: Poland
- Voivodeship: Lower Silesian
- County: Wrocław
- Gmina: Długołęka

Skała [ˈskawa] is a village in the administrative district of Gmina Długołęka, within Wrocław County, Lower Silesian Voivodeship, in south-western Poland.
