= Bukowina, Lower Silesian Voivodeship =

Bukowina
- Village
- Location within Poland
- Coordinates: 51°12′38″N 17°08′26″E
- Country: Poland
- Voivodeship: Lower Silesian
- County: Wrocław
- Gmina: Długołęka
- Population: 220

Bukowina [bukɔˈvina] is a village in the administrative district of Gmina Długołęka, within Wrocław County, Lower Silesian Voivodeship, in south-western Poland.
