= Wilczyce, Wrocław County =

Wilczyce Wildschütz
- Village
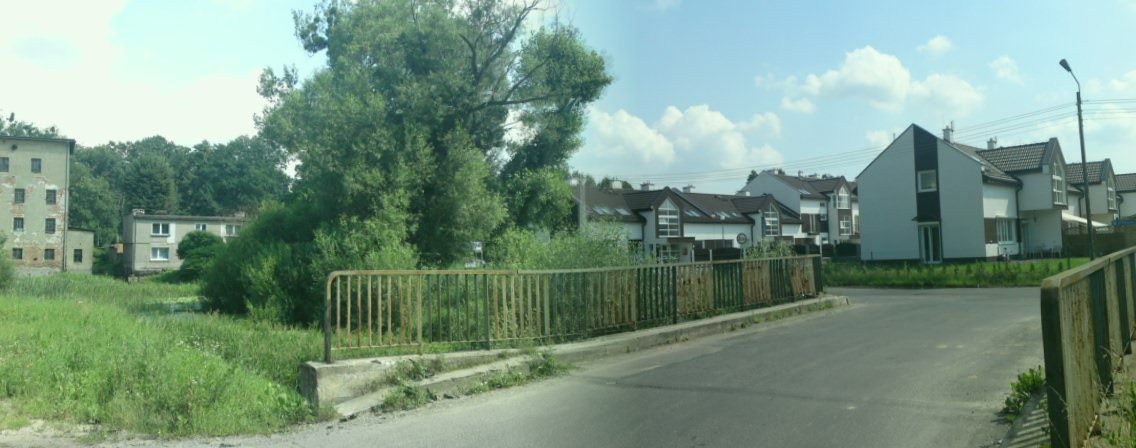

- Location within Poland
- Coordinates: 51°07′46″N 17°09′17″E
- Country: Poland
- Voivodeship: Lower Silesian
- County: Wrocław
- Gmina: Długołęka
- Population: 590

Wilczyce [vilˈt͡ʂɨt͡sɛ] (German: Wildschütz) is a village in the administrative district of Gmina Długołęka, within Wrocław County, Lower Silesian Voivodeship, in south-western Poland.
