= Łosice (disambiguation) =

Łosice may mean:

- Łosice, a town in Masovian Voivodeship, eastern Poland
- Łosice, Lower Silesian Voivodeship, a village in Wrocław County, south-west Poland
- Gmina Łosice, an urban-rural administrative district in Łosice County, Masovian Voivodeship, in east-central Poland
- Łosice County, a unit of territorial administration and local government (powiat) in Masovian Voivodeship, east-central Poland
- The Łosice transmitter, a television and FM radio transmission facility at Chotycze in Łosice County
