= Pasikurowice =

Village in Lower Silesian Voivodeship, Poland

- Village
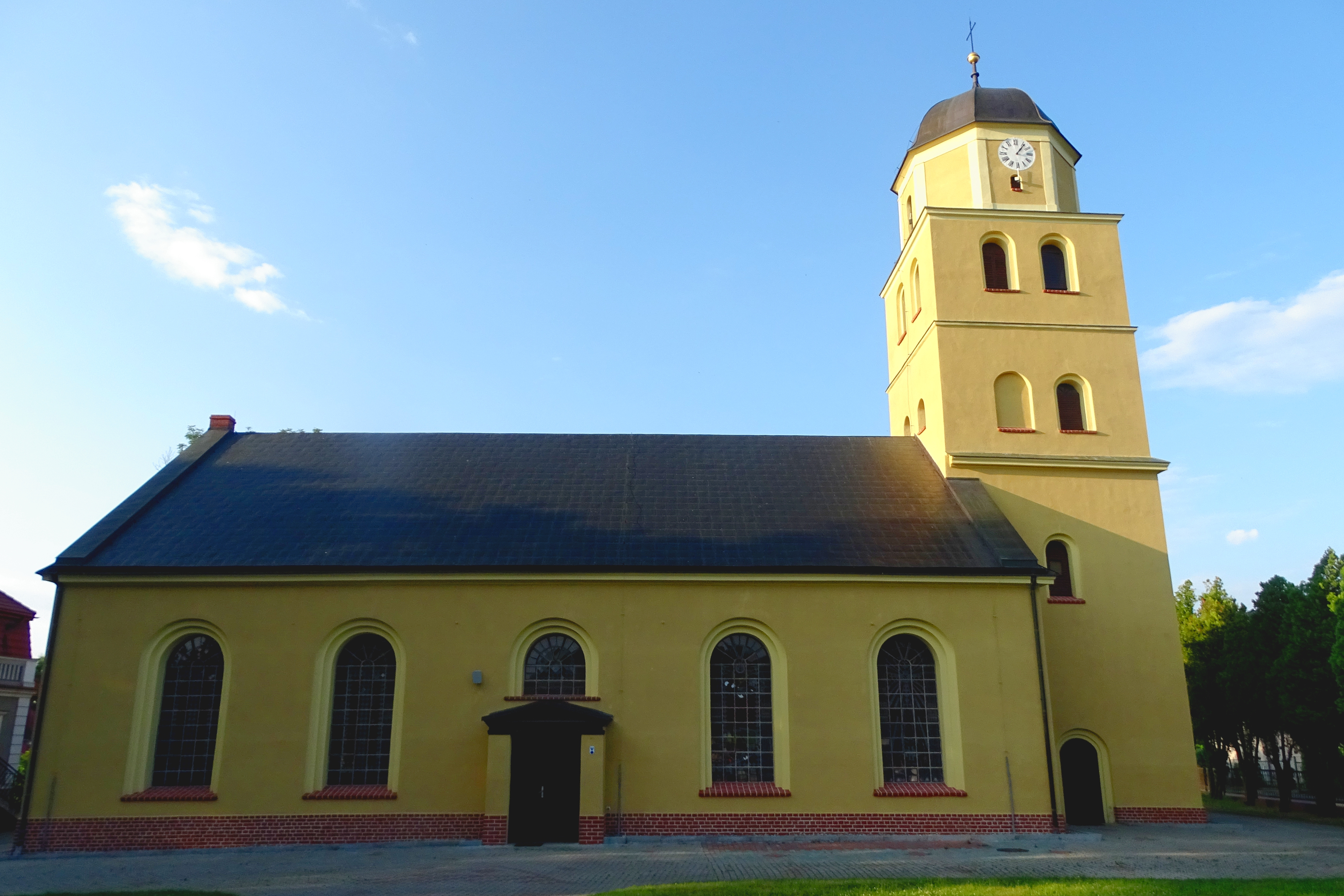
- Saint Joseph parish church

- Location within Poland
- Coordinates: 51°13′N 17°6′E
- Country: Poland
- Voivodeship: Lower Silesian
- County: Wrocław
- Gmina: Długołęka
- First mentioned: 13th century
- Time zone: UTC+1 (CET)
  - Summer (DST): UTC+2 (CEST)
- Vehicle registration: DWR

Pasikurowice [paɕikurɔˈvit͡sɛ] is a village in the administrative district of Gmina Długołęka, within Wrocław County, Lower Silesian Voivodeship, in south-western Poland.

== History ==
The village was first mentioned in the 13th century, when it was part of fragmented Piast-ruled Poland. Its name is of Polish origin. Later on, it also passed to Bohemia (Czechia), Prussia and Germany. It became again part of Poland following Germany's defeat in World War II in 1945.

== Transport ==
There is a train station in Pasikurowice. The S8 highway runs nearby, east of the village.
