= Dobroszów Oleśnicki =

- Village
- Location within Poland
- Coordinates: 51°13′01″N 17°13′43″E
- Country: Poland
- Voivodeship: Lower Silesian
- County: Wrocław
- Gmina: Długołęka

Dobroszów Oleśnicki (Polish pronunciation: [dɔˈbrɔʂuf ɔlɛɕˈɲitskʲi]) is a village in the administrative district of Gmina Długołęka, within Wrocław County, Lower Silesian Voivodeship, in south-western Poland.
