= Oleśniczka =

- Village
- Location within Poland
- Coordinates: 51°08′36″N 17°16′54″E
- Country: Poland
- Voivodeship: Lower Silesian
- County: Wrocław
- Gmina: Długołęka
- First mentioned: 1204
- Time zone: UTC+1 (CET)
  - Summer (DST): UTC+2 (CEST)
- Vehicle registration: DWR

Oleśniczka [ɔlɛɕˈnit͡ʂka] is a village in the administrative district of Gmina Długołęka, within Wrocław County, Lower Silesian Voivodeship, in south-western Poland.

== History ==
The village was first mentioned in a document of Duke Henry the Bearded in 1204, when it was part of fragmented Piast-ruled Poland. It was mentioned under its Latinized Old Polish name Holesnicha Coseborii (Oleśnica Chociebora), which means Oleśnica of Chociebor. The name Oleśnica comes from the Polish word olcha (alder), while Chociebor is an Old Polish male name, and hints at the owner of the village in the early 13th century. The name Oleśniczka is a diminutive of the original name, in order to differentiate it from the town of Oleśnica, also located in the region.

Later on, the village was also part of Bohemia (Czechia), Prussia and Germany, before it became again part of Poland following Germany's defeat in World War II in 1945.
