= Dąbrowica, Wrocław County =

Dąbrowica
- Village
- Location within Poland
- Coordinates: 51°13′9″N 17°12′58″E
- Country: Poland
- Voivodeship: Lower Silesian
- County: Wrocław
- Gmina: Długołęka

Dąbrowica [dɔmbrɔˈvit͡sa] is a village in the administrative district of Gmina Długołęka, within Wrocław County, Lower Silesian Voivodeship, in south-western Poland.
