= Stępin =

- Village
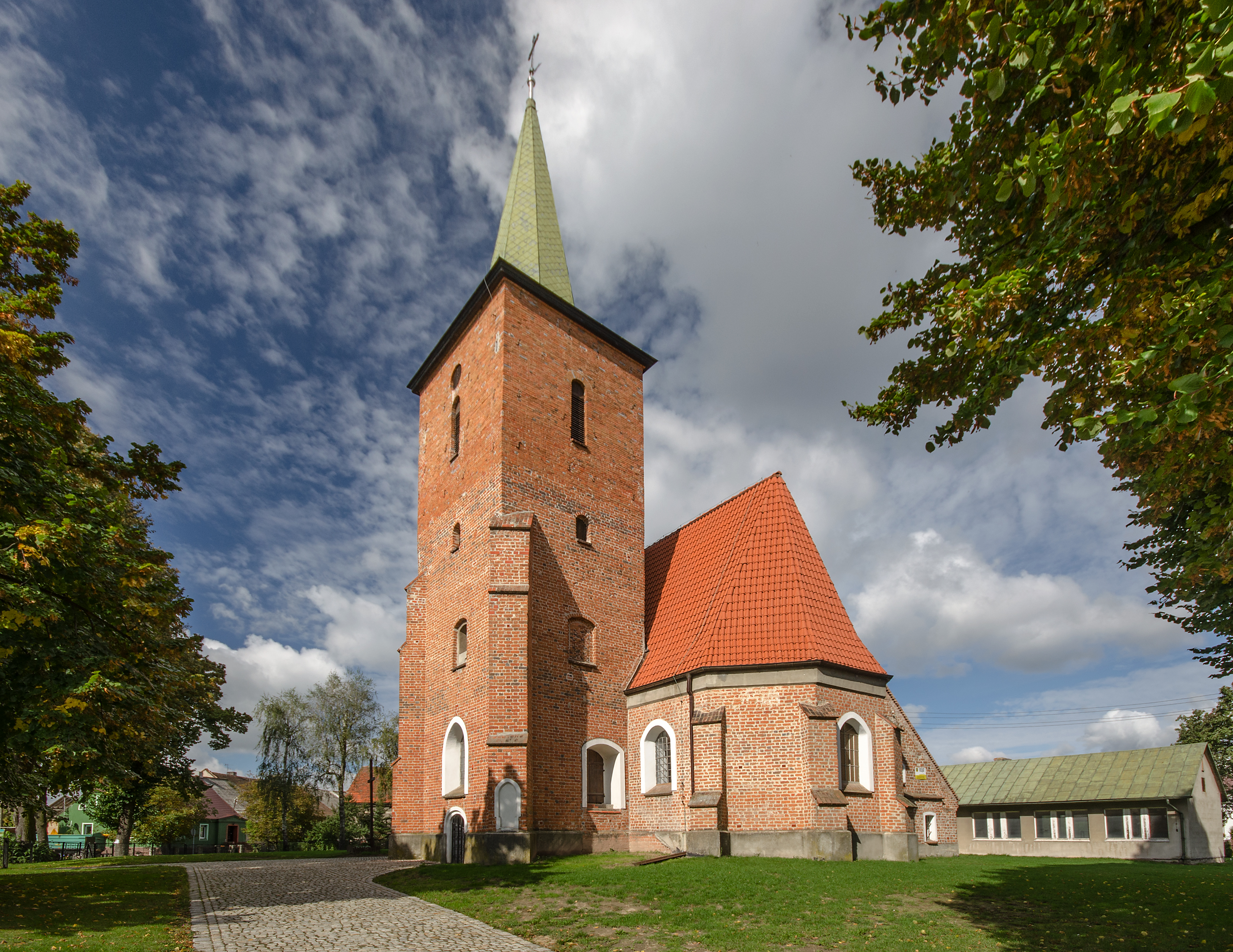
- Catholic church

- Location within Poland
- Coordinates: 51°12′41″N 17°16′57″E
- Country: Poland
- Voivodeship: Lower Silesian
- County: Wrocław
- Gmina: Długołęka
- Population: 380

Stępin [ˈstɛmpin] is a village in the administrative district of Gmina Długołęka, within Wrocław County, Lower Silesian Voivodeship, in south-western Poland.
