= Jaksonowice =

- Village
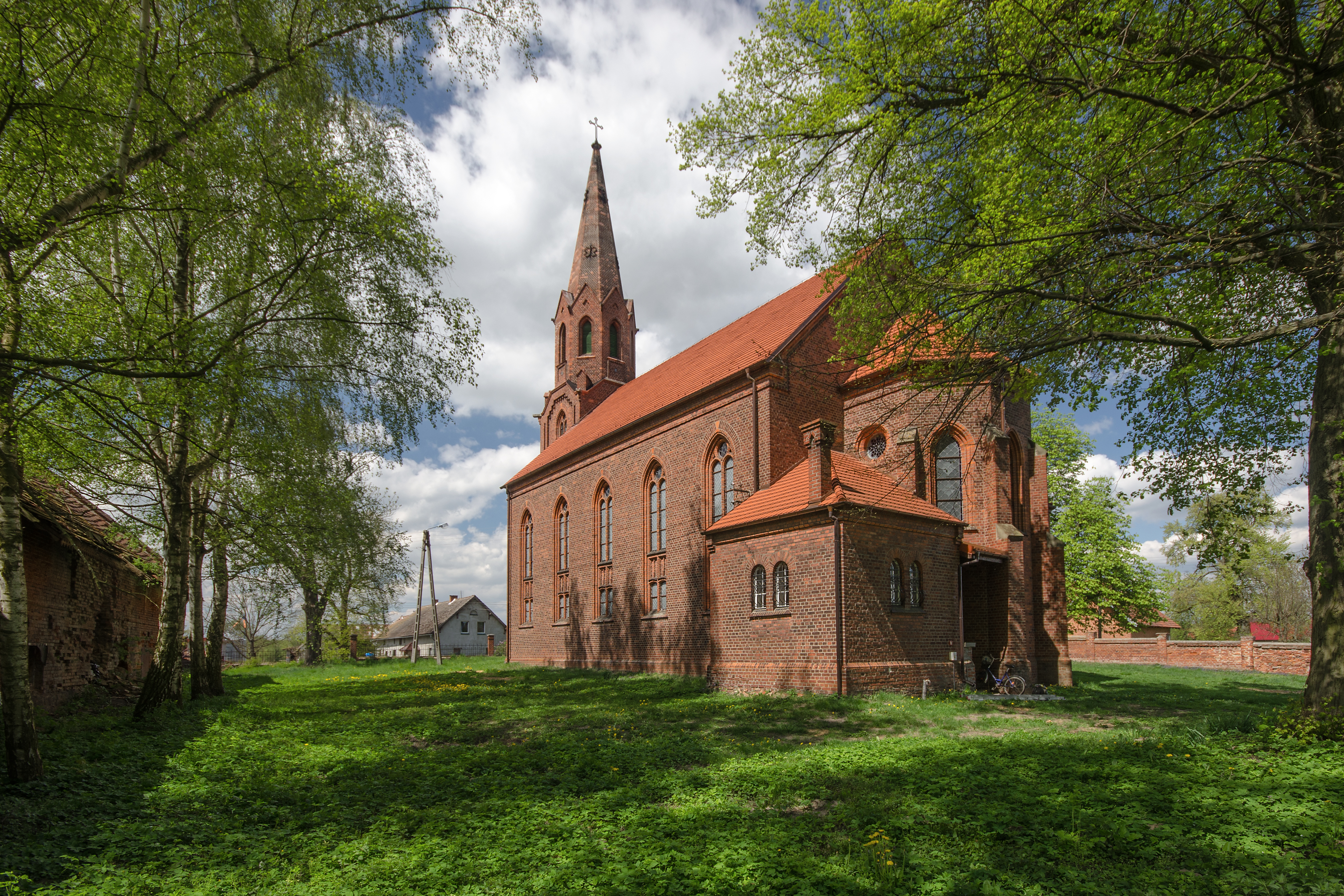
- Catholic church

- Location within Poland
- Coordinates: 51°14′50″N 17°14′36″E
- Country: Poland
- Voivodeship: Lower Silesian
- County: Wrocław
- Gmina: Długołęka

Jaksonowice [jaksɔnɔˈvit͡sɛ] is a village in the administrative district of Gmina Długołęka, within Wrocław County, Lower Silesian Voivodeship, in south-western Poland.
