= Węgrów, Lower Silesian Voivodeship =

Węgrów
- Village
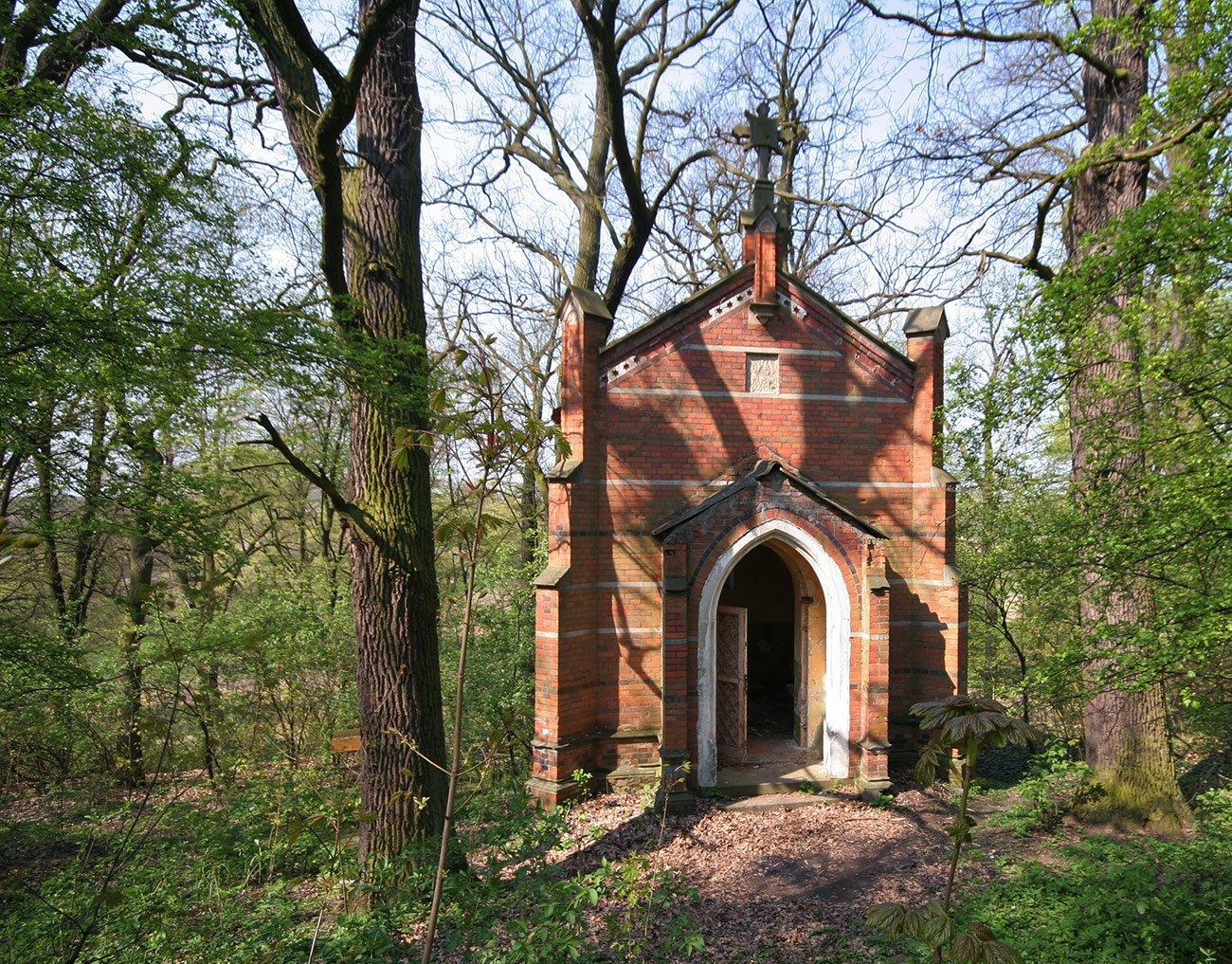
- Cemetery chapel in Węgrów

- Location within Poland
- Coordinates: 51°15′58″N 17°13′12″E
- Country: Poland
- Voivodeship: Lower Silesian
- County: Wrocław
- Gmina: Długołęka
- Time zone: UTC+1 (CET)
  - Summer (DST): UTC+2 (CEST)
- Vehicle registration: DWR

Węgrów [ˈvɛŋɡruf] is a village in the administrative district of Gmina Długołęka, within Wrocław County, Lower Silesian Voivodeship, in south-western Poland.

== History ==
The area became part of the emerging Polish state in the 10th century. Centuries later it passed to Bohemia (Czechia), Prussia and Germany. It became again part of Poland following Germany's defeat in World War II in 1945.
