= Tokary, Lower Silesian Voivodeship =

Tokary
- Village
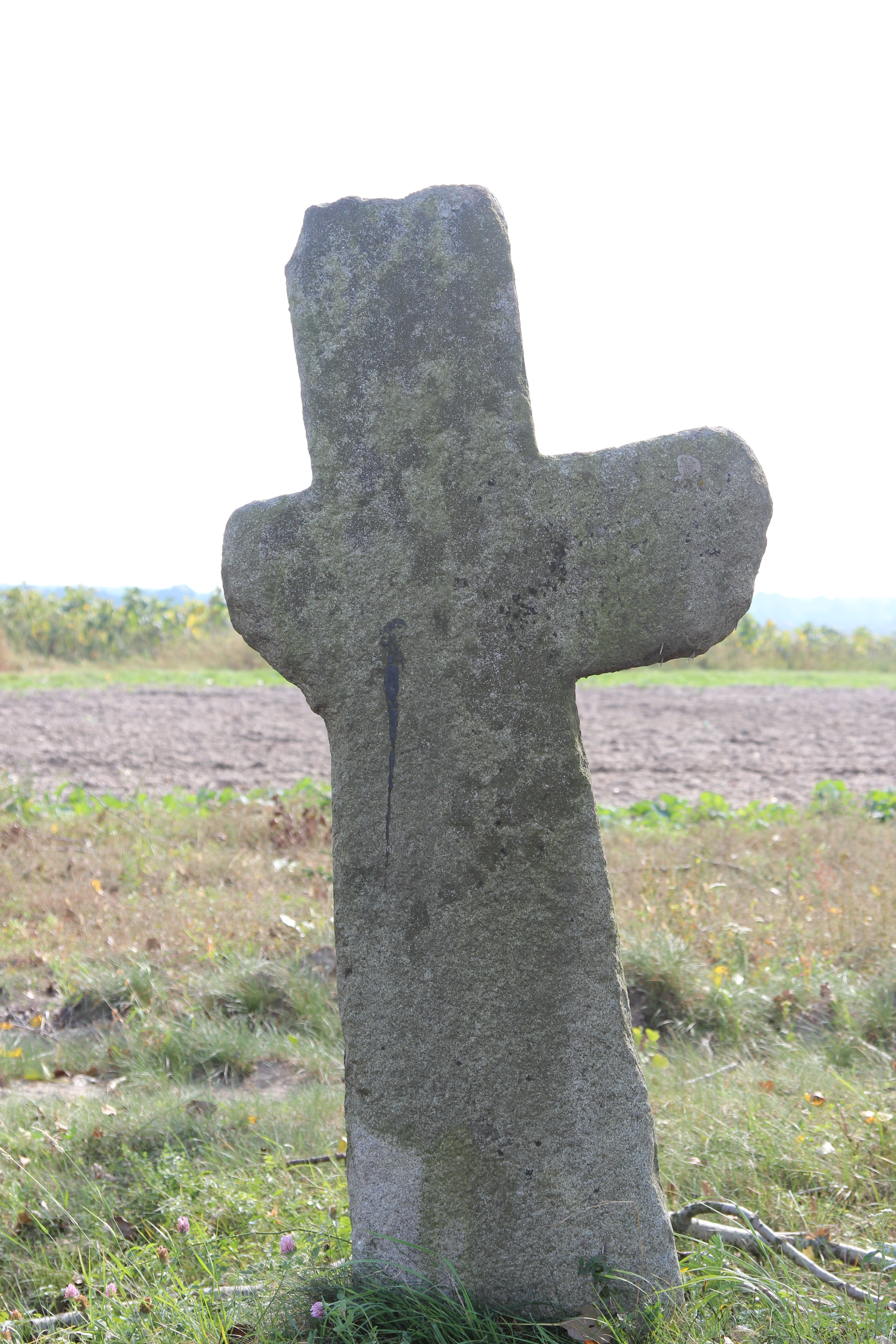
- Tokary stone cross 2014

- Location within Poland
- Coordinates: 51°13′58″N 17°08′32″E
- Country: Poland
- Voivodeship: Lower Silesian
- County: Wrocław
- Gmina: Długołęka
- Population (approx.): 160

Tokary [tɔˈkarɨ] is a village in the administrative district of Gmina Długołęka, within Wrocław County, Lower Silesian Voivodeship, in south-western Poland.
