= Kamień, Wrocław County =

Kamień
- Village
- Location within Poland
- Coordinates: 51°09′59″N 17°13′09″E
- Country: Poland
- Voivodeship: Lower Silesian
- County: Wrocław
- Gmina: Długołęka

Kamień (Polish pronunciation: [ˈkamjɛj̃]) is a village in the administrative district of Gmina Długołęka, within Wrocław County, Lower Silesian Voivodeship, in south-western Poland.
