= Łozina =

- Village
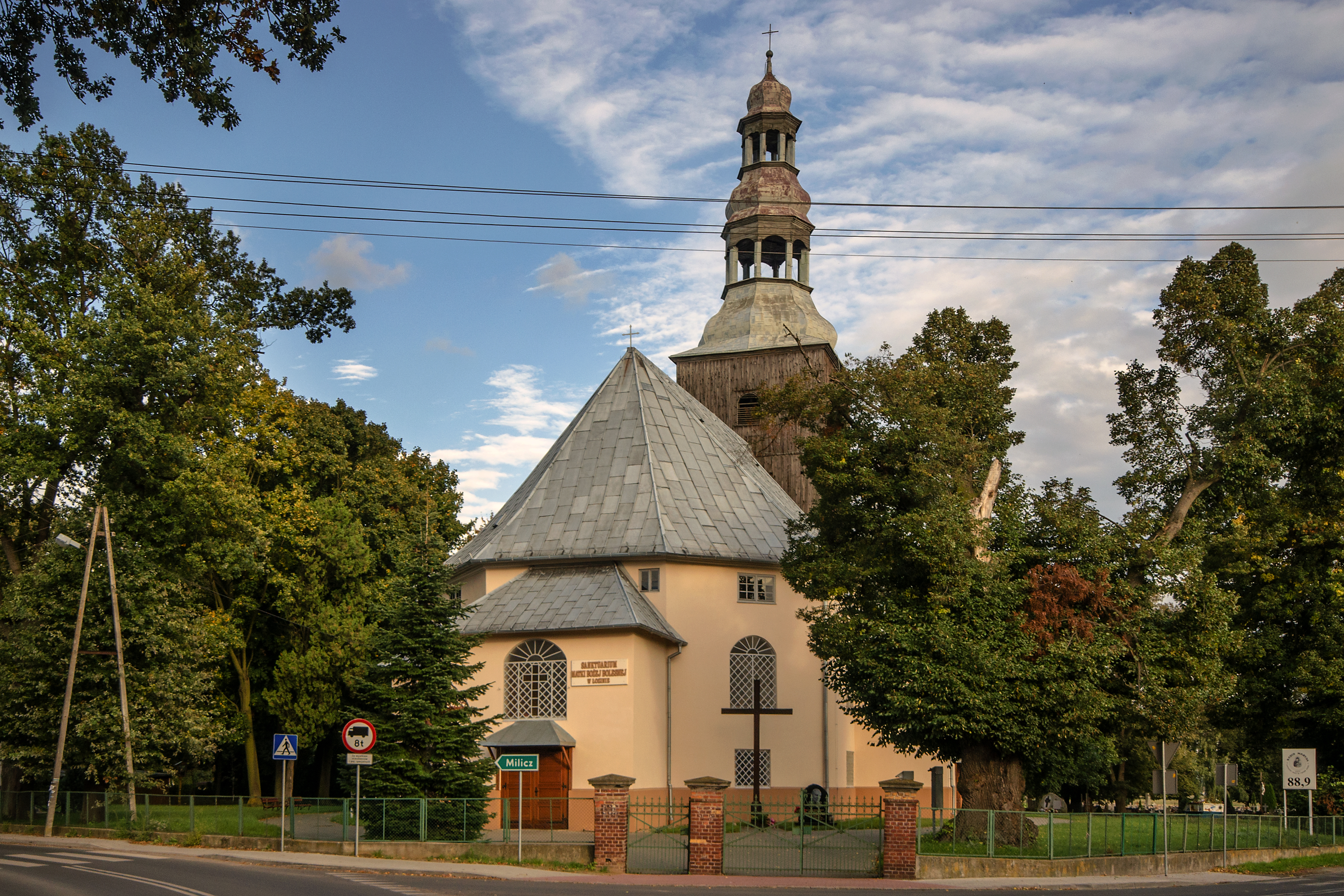
- SM Łozina kościół Matki Boskiej Bolesnej

- Location within Poland
- Coordinates: 51°14′N 17°10′E
- Country: Poland
- Voivodeship: Lower Silesian
- County: Wrocław
- Gmina: Długołęka
- Population: 450

Łozina [wɔˈʑina] is a village in the administrative district of Gmina Długołęka, within Wrocław County, Lower Silesian Voivodeship, in south-western Poland.
