= Januszkowice, Lower Silesian Voivodeship =

Januszkowice
- Village
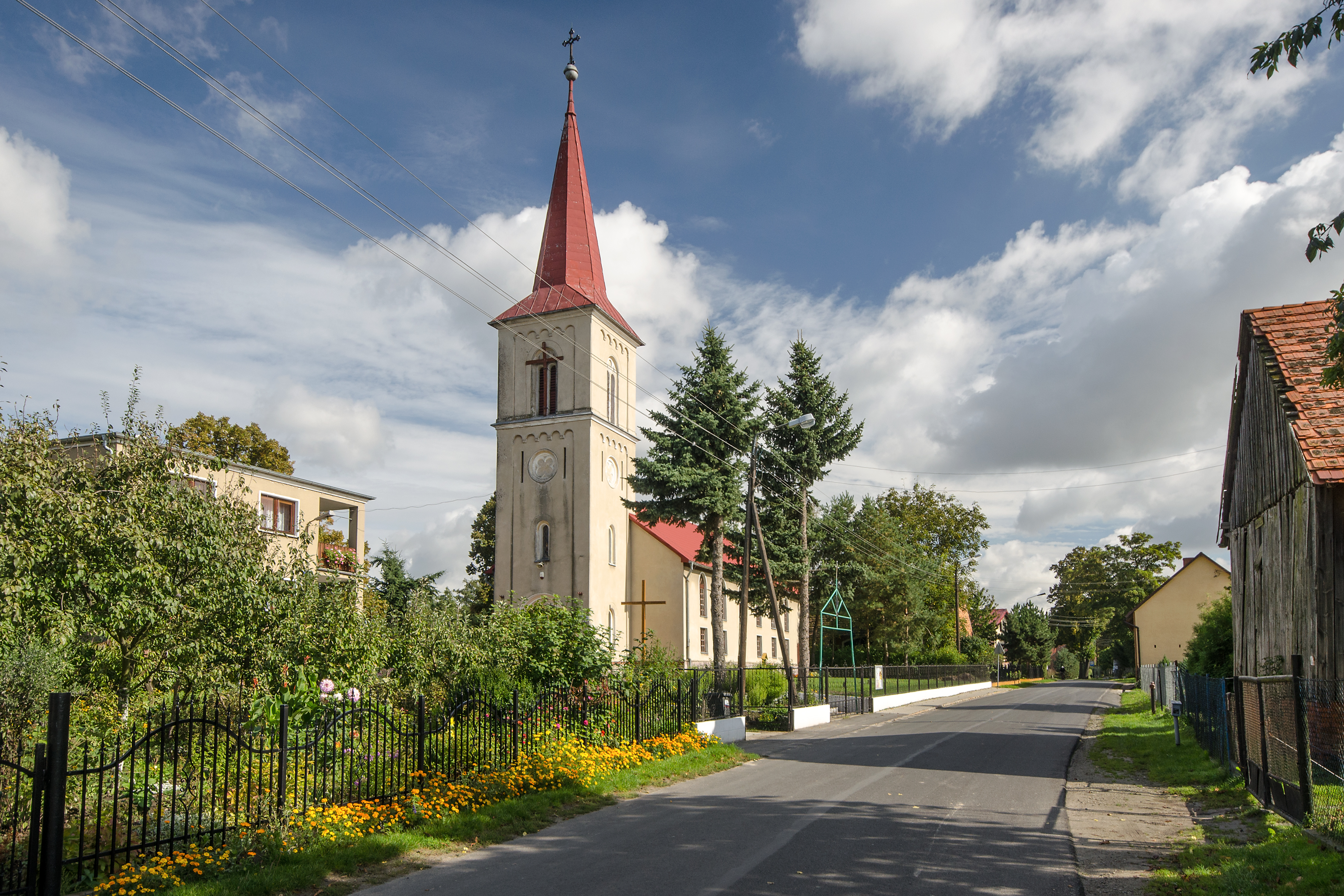
- Catholic church

- Location within Poland
- Coordinates: 51°13′19″N 17°14′25″E
- Country: Poland
- Voivodeship: Lower Silesian
- County: Wrocław
- Gmina: Długołęka

Januszkowice [januʂkɔˈvit͡sɛ] is a village in the administrative district of Gmina Długołęka, within Wrocław County, Lower Silesian Voivodeship, in south-western Poland.
