= Raków, Wrocław County =

Raków
- Village
- Location within Poland
- Coordinates: 51°10′08″N 17°16′50″E
- Country: Poland
- Voivodeship: Lower Silesian
- County: Wrocław
- Gmina: Długołęka

Population
  - Total: 240
- Time zone: UTC+1 (CET)
  - Summer (DST): UTC+2 (CEST)
- Vehicle registration: DWR

Raków ([ˈrakuf]) is a village in the administrative district of Gmina Długołęka, within Wrocław County, Lower Silesian Voivodeship, in south-western Poland.

The name of the village is of Polish origin and comes from the word rak, which means "crayfish". In 1376, it was mentioned as Rakow.
