= Bierzyce =

- Village
- Location within Poland
- Coordinates: 51°14′19″N 17°11′00″E
- Country: Poland
- Voivodeship: Lower Silesian
- County: Wrocław
- Gmina: Długołęka

Bierzyce [bjɛˈʐɨt͡sɛ] is a village in the administrative district of Gmina Długołęka, within Wrocław County, Lower Silesian Voivodeship, in south-western Poland.
