= Godzieszowa =

- Village
- Location within Poland
- Coordinates: 51°14′27″N 17°07′50″E
- Country: Poland
- Voivodeship: Lower Silesian
- County: Wrocław
- Gmina: Długołęka
- Population: 310

Godzieszowa [ɡɔd͡ʑɛˈʂɔva] is a village in the administrative district of Gmina Długołęka, within Wrocław County, Lower Silesian Voivodeship, in south-western Poland.
