= Pietrzykowice =

Pietrzykowice may refer to the following places in Poland:

- Pietrzykowice, Gmina Długołęka in Lower Silesian Voivodeship (south-west Poland)
- Pietrzykowice, Gmina Kąty Wrocławskie in Lower Silesian Voivodeship (south-west Poland)
- Pietrzykowice, Silesian Voivodeship (south Poland)
