= Siedlec, Lower Silesian Voivodeship =

Siedlec
- Village
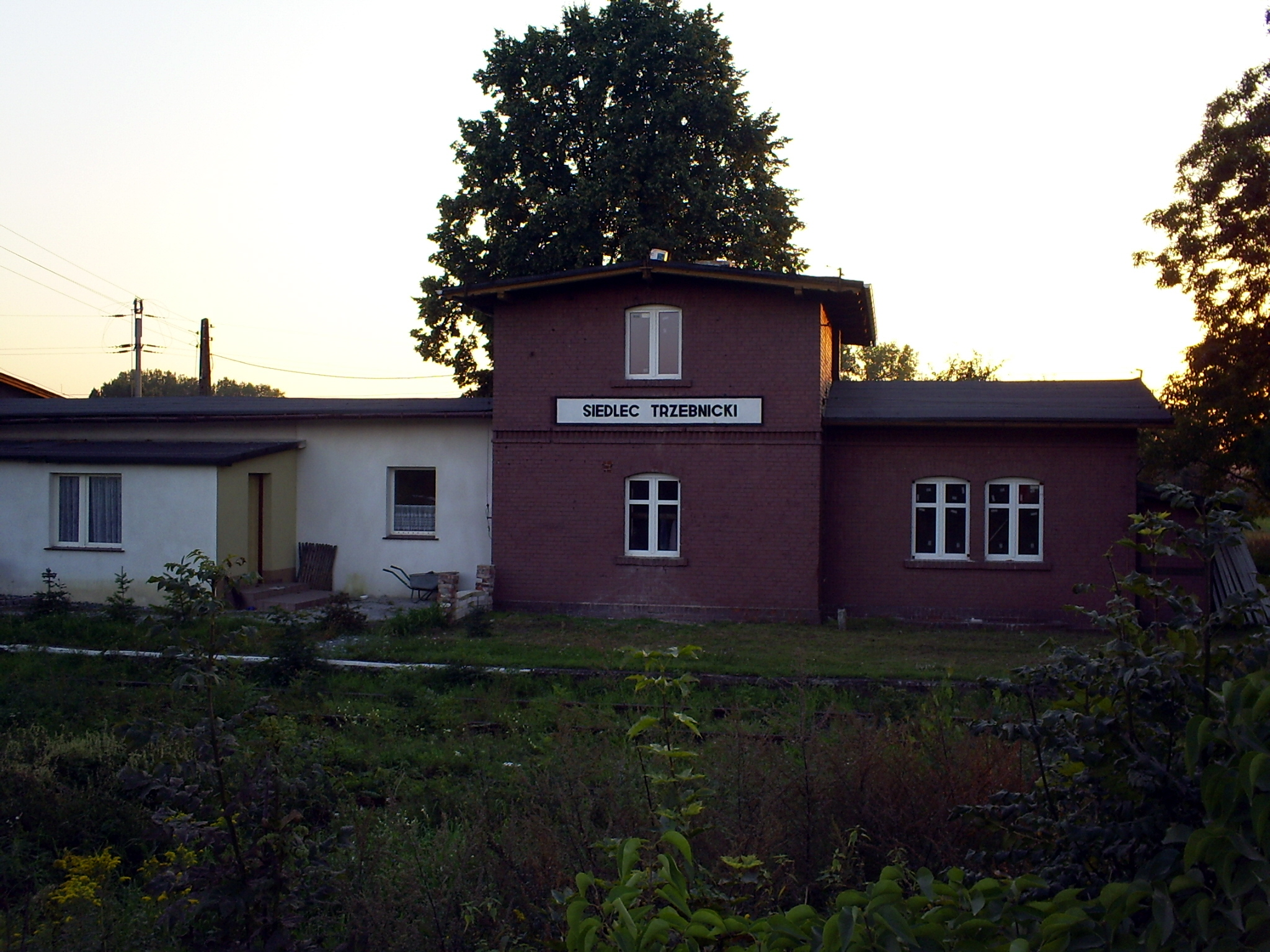
- Dolnosląskie Siedlec Dworzec Kolejowy

- Location within Poland
- Coordinates: 51°13′57″N 17°06′42″E
- Country: Poland
- Voivodeship: Lower Silesian
- County: Wrocław
- Gmina: Długołęka
- Population (approx.): 1,500

Siedlec [ˈɕɛdlɛt͡s] is a village in the administrative district of Gmina Długołęka, within Wrocław County, Lower Silesian Voivodeship, in south-western Poland.
