= Shabnam Ramaswamy =

- Born: 1 July; Katna, Murshidabad, West Bengal, India
- Occupations: Director of NGO Street Survivors India, Interior Designer
- Known for: Street Survivors India
- Spouse: Jugnu Ramaswamy

Shabnam Ramaswamy is a social worker and interior designer in India. She is best known for her NGO Street Survivors India (SSI) situated in Katna, Murshidabad in West Bengal, which operates education and economic development programs for local villages.

== Early life ==
Shabnam was born in the village of Katna, Kolkata. She studied at La Martinière Calcutta.

She joined Mira Nair's Salaam Balak, where she rescued runaways at Delhi station. A senior journalist, Jugnu Ramaswamy, approached her with the intention of making a film on her work. After making the film, the two married.

== Career ==
=== Street Survivors India ===
Street Survivors India was formed in 1990 in Delhi to provide learning opportunities for working street children. It operated Jagriti school, which was also a kitchen and night shelter. It was demolished in a government "clean-up drive" to reclaim commercial space.

SSI launched the Jagriti Gramin Library project with assistance from the Rajiv Gandhi Foundation. This program runs eleven libraries in villages near Katna. Each library was envisaged as a nodal point and support centre for children from an additional ten surrounding villages. For a minimal fee, students can read or borrow books related to their school subjects, as well as access works of reference and fiction.

== Recognition ==
- 2013: Courage Award from Women Have Wings.
