= Kiełczówek =

- Village
- Location within Poland
- Coordinates: 51°07′03″N 17°11′19″E
- Country: Poland
- Voivodeship: Lower Silesian
- County: Wrocław
- Gmina: Długołęka

Kiełczówek [kʲɛu̯ˈt͡ʂuvɛk] is a village in the administrative district of Gmina Długołęka, within Wrocław County, Lower Silesian Voivodeship, in south-western Poland.
