= Kątna =

- Village
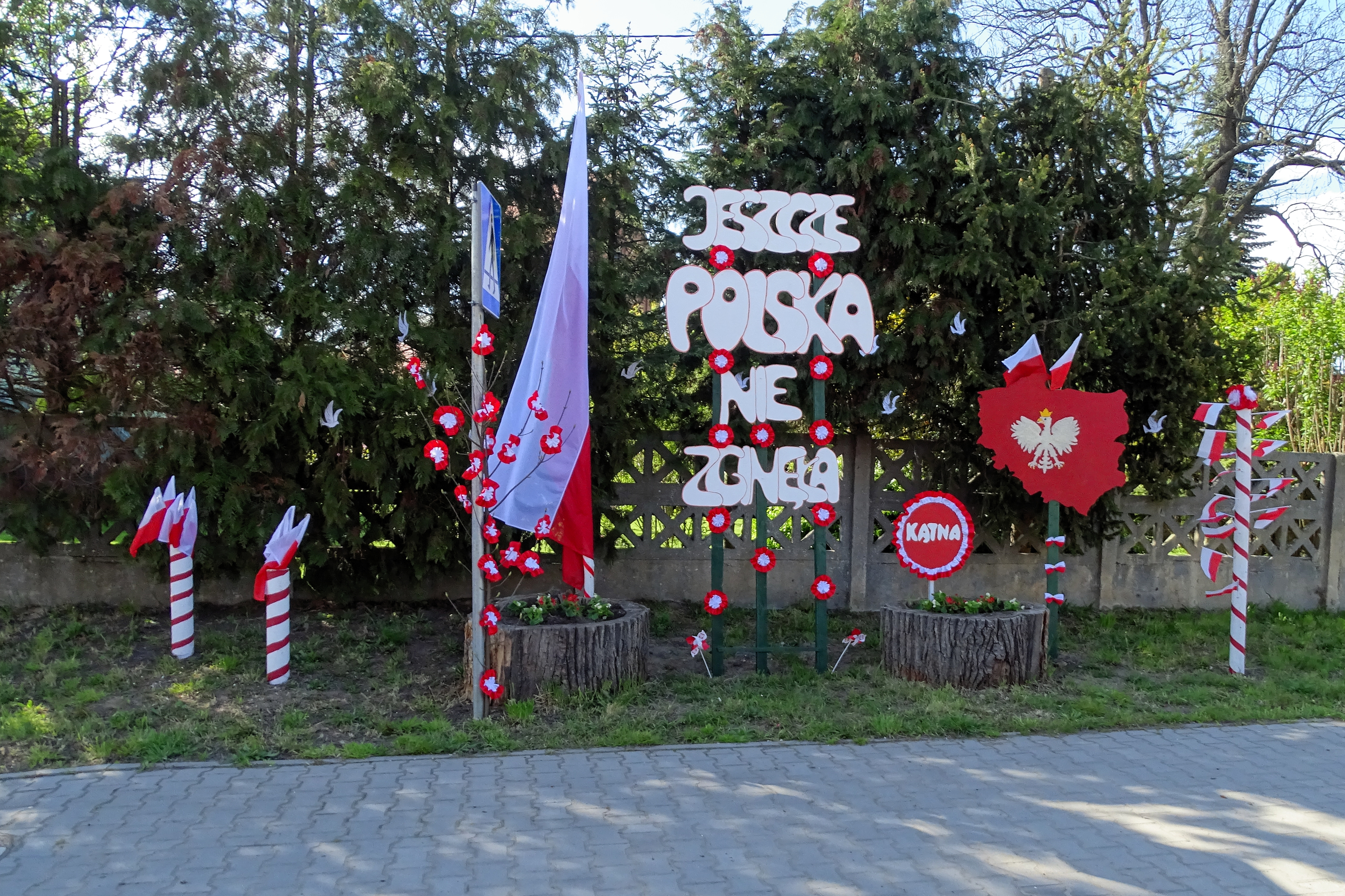

- Location within Poland
- Coordinates: 51°07′55″N 17°17′09″E
- Country: Poland
- Voivodeship: Lower Silesian
- County: Wrocław
- Gmina: Długołęka
- Population: 360

Kątna [ˈkɔntna] is a village in the administrative district of Gmina Długołęka, within Wrocław County, Lower Silesian Voivodeship, in south-western Poland.
