= Mirków, Lower Silesian Voivodeship =

Mirków
- Village
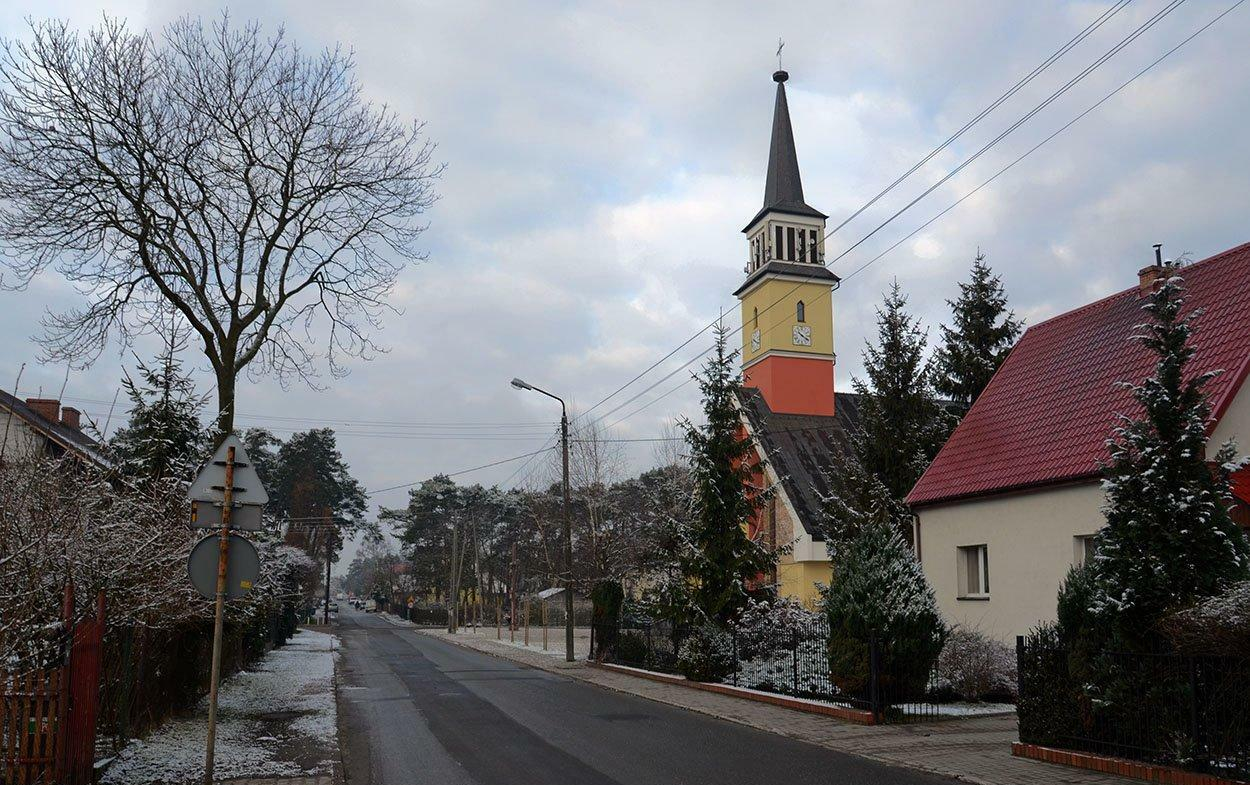

- Location within Poland
- Coordinates: 51°10′00″N 17°09′25″E
- Country: Poland
- Voivodeship: Lower Silesian
- County: Wrocław
- Gmina: Długołęka
- Population: 1,200
- Website: http://www.mirkow.gov.pl

Mirków [ˈmirkuf] is a village in the administrative district of Gmina Długołęka, within Wrocław County, Lower Silesian Voivodeship, in south-western Poland.
