= Gmina Długołęka =

Gmina Długołęka Długołęka Commune
- Gmina
- Flag Coat of arms
- Interactive map of Gmina Długołęka
- Coordinates (Długołęka): 51°10′29″N 17°11′43″E
- Country: Poland
- Voivodeship: Lower Silesian
- County: Wrocław
- Seat: Długołęka

Area
  - Total: 212.41 km^{2} (82.01 sq mi)

Population (2019-06-30)
  - Total: 33,022
  - Density: 155.46/km^{2} (402.65/sq mi)
- Website: https://gmina.dlugoleka.pl

Gmina Długołęka is a rural gmina (administrative district) in Wrocław County, Lower Silesian Voivodeship, in south-western Poland. Its seat is the village of Długołęka, which lies approximately 13 kilometres (8 mi) north-east of the regional capital Wrocław. It is part of the Wrocław metropolitan area.

The gmina covers an area of 212.41 square kilometres (82.0 sq mi). As of 2019, its total population was 33,022.

== Neighbouring gminas ==
Gmina Długołęka is bordered by the city of Wrocław and by the gminas of Czernica, Dobroszyce, Oleśnica, Trzebnica, Wisznia Mała and Zawonia.

== Villages ==
The gmina contains the villages of Bąków, Bielawa, Bierzyce, Borowa, Brzezia Łąka, Budziwojowice, Bukowina, Byków, Dąbrowica, Długołęka, Dobroszów Oleśnicki, Domaszczyn, Godzieszowa, Jaksonowice, Januszkowice, Kamień, Kątna, Kępa, Kiełczów, Kiełczówek, Krakowiany, Łosice, Łozina, Michałowice, Mirków, Oleśniczka, Pasikurowice, Piecowice, Pietrzykowice, Pruszowice, Raków, Ramiszów, Siedlec, Skała, Śliwice, Stępin, Szczodre, Tokary, Węgrów, Wilczyce and Zaprężyn.

== Twin towns – sister cities ==
Gmina Długołęka is twinned with:

- Fossano, Italy
- Sarny, Ukraine
- Velen, Germany
