= Pietrzykowice, Gmina Długołęka =

Pietrzykowice
- Village
- Location within Poland
- Coordinates: 51°07′24″N 17°13′57″E
- Country: Poland
- Voivodeship: Lower Silesian
- County: Wrocław
- Gmina: Długołęka

Pietrzykowice [pjɛtʂɨkɔˈvit͡sɛ] is a village in the administrative district of Gmina Długołęka, within Wrocław County, Lower Silesian Voivodeship, in south-western Poland.
