= Łosice, Lower Silesian Voivodeship =

Łosice
- Village
- Location within Poland
- Coordinates: 51°13′15″N 17°12′11″E
- Country: Poland
- Voivodeship: Lower Silesian
- County: Wrocław
- Gmina: Długołęka

Population
  - Total: 200
- Postal code: 55-095

Łosice [wɔˈɕit͡sɛ] is a village in the administrative district of Gmina Długołęka, within Wrocław County, Lower Silesian Voivodeship, in south-western Poland.
