= Mythily Ramaswamy =

Indian mathematician

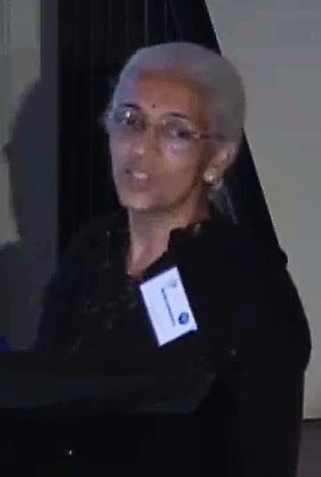
- Ramaswamy speaks at CNRS in 2020
- Born: 6 June 1954 (age 72)
- Education: Pierre and Marie Curie University
- Scientific career
- Fields: Mathematics
- Workplaces: TIFR Centre for Applicable Mathematics
- Doctoral advisor: Henri Berestycki

Mythily Ramaswamy (born 6 June 1954) is an Indian mathematician and professor in the Department of Mathematics at the TIFR Centre for Applicable Mathematics of the Tata Institute of Fundamental Research in Bangalore. Her research involves functional analysis and the controllability of partial differential equations.

== Education ==
Ramaswamy was born near Mumbai to a banking family but moved often to other parts of India as a child. She earned her bachelor's and master's from the University of Bombay. She obtained her doctorate in 1990 from Pierre and Marie Curie University in Paris. Her dissertation, Sur des questions de symetrie dans des problemes elliptiques [On questions of symmetry in elliptic problems], was supervised by Henri Berestycki.

== Recognition ==
Ramaswamy was the 2004 winner of the Kalpana Chawla Award of the Karnataka State Council for Science and Technology, "given to a young woman scientist for achievements in the field of science and technology". She was elected to the Indian Academy of Sciences in 2007. She became a Fulbright Scholar in 2016–2017, which funded her to visit Michael Renardy at Virginia Tech.
