= Długołęka, Lower Silesian Voivodeship =

Długołęka
- Village
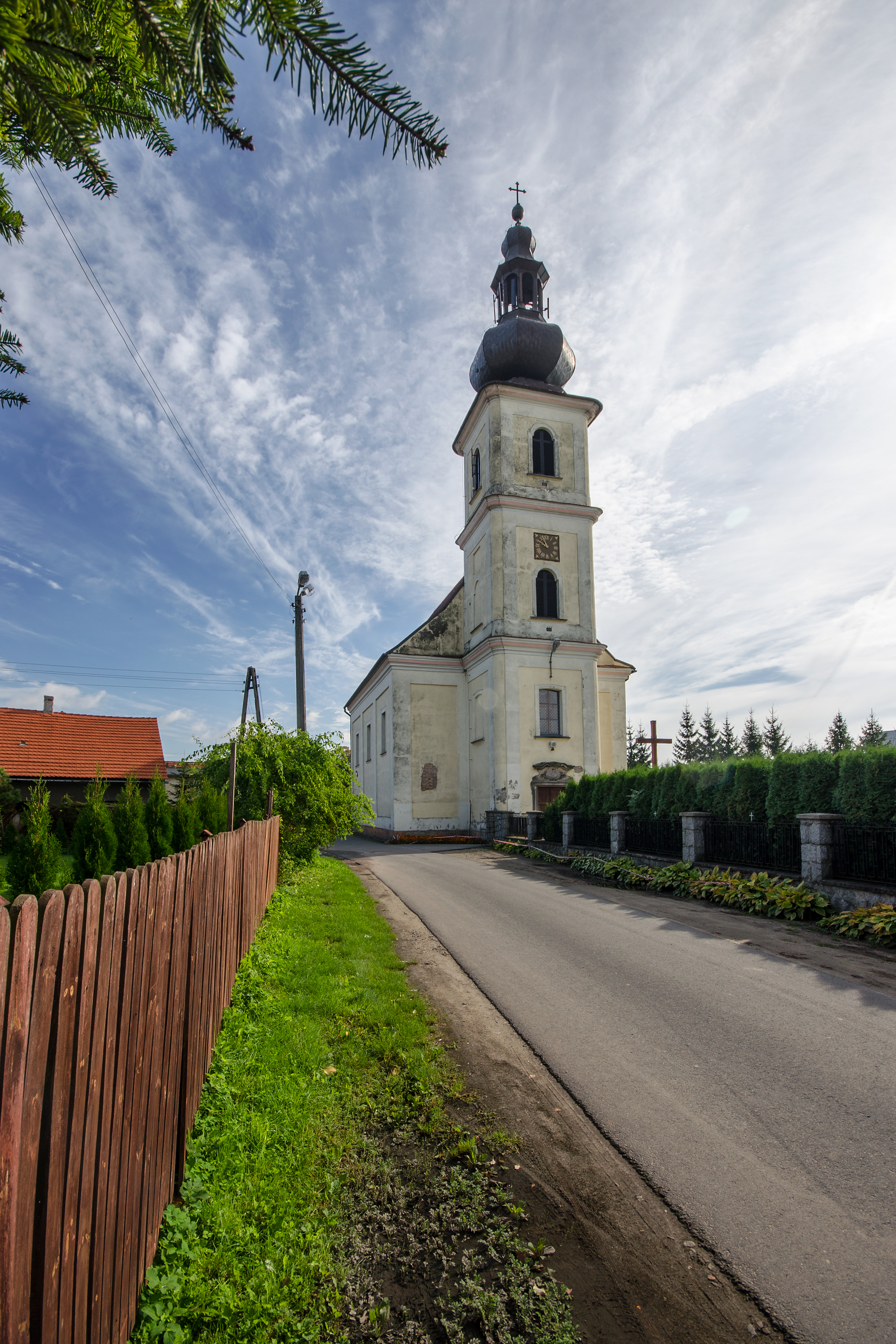
- Church of Saint Michael Archangel

- Location within Poland
- Coordinates: 51°10′29″N 17°11′43″E
- Country: Poland
- Voivodeship: Lower Silesian
- County: Wrocław
- Gmina: Długołęka
- First mentioned: 13th century

Population
  - Total: 2,620
- Time zone: UTC+1 (CET)
  - Summer (DST): UTC+2 (CEST)
- Vehicle registration: DWR

Długołęka (Polish: [dwuɡɔˈwɛŋka]) (German: Langewiese) is a village in Wrocław County, Lower Silesian Voivodeship, in south-western Poland. It is the seat of the administrative district (gmina) called Gmina Długołęka.

== History ==
The first references to the village date back to the 13th century, when it was part of fragmented Piast-ruled Poland. Later on, it also passed to Bohemia (Czechia), Prussia and Germany. A labour camp of the Reich Labour Service was operated in the village under Nazi Germany. It became again part of Poland following Germany's defeat in World War II in 1945.

== Transport ==
The village has a train station with regular connections to Wrocław, Jelcz-Laskowice and Oleśnica.
