= Ramaswamy S =

Indian-American structural biologist

- Born: 31 October 1964 (age 61); Coimbatore, Tamil Nadu, India
- Education: Indian Institute of Science Swedish University of Agricultural Sciences
- Known for: Macromolecular crystallography Protein Structure and Function
- Scientific career
- Fields: Structural Biology, Biochemistry & Biophysics
- Workplaces: Institute for Stem Cell Biology and Regenerative Medicine Centre for Cellular and Molecular Platforms University of Iowa, Carver College of Medicine
- Doctoral advisor: M. R. N. Murthy
- Website: www.instem.res.in/faculty/ramas

Ramaswamy S is an Indian-American structural biologist of Indian origin. He is currently professor of biological sciences, professor at the Weldon School of Biomedical Engineering and director of the Bindley Bioscience Center at Purdue University. He was a senior professor at Institute of stem cell biology and regenerative medicine (inStem) from 2009 to 2019. Ramaswamy S also abbreviated as "Rams" by his students and colleagues, held the founding dean's position at inStem from May 2009. He was also the founding CEO of Center for Cellular and molecular platforms (C-CAMP), Bangalore-Biocluster from May 2009 to May 2016. His major role at National Center for Biological Sciences (NCBS) was to bridge the gap between research and application. He works in close coordination with Department of Biotechnology (DBT), and other ministries of the Government of India.

Rams obtained his Ph.D. in molecular biophysics under the guidance of Prof. M. R. N. Murthy from the Indian Institute of Science (IISc) in 1992 and became a post-doctoral fellow in the laboratory of Prof. Hans Eklund at the Swedish University of Agricultural Sciences (SLU). After being a post-doc from 1992 to 1994, he became a researcher at SLU, later a docent heading a research group until 1999. His primary area of expertise involves protein crystallography.

== Career ==
After being a post-doc at Swedish University of Agricultural Sciences and being a researcher until 1999 he joined the University of Iowa, Carver College of Medicine as an assistant professor on Jan 2000. Although a primary faculty member of the biochemistry department, he had adjunct affiliations in chemical, biochemical engineering, physiology and biophysics department as well. He was also the director of protein crystallography facility. He eventually became the assistant dean for Scientific Affairs and director of core research facilities at the Carver College of Medicine, University of Iowa until he accepted a position as Senior Professor and Dean of inStem, the Institute for Stem Cell Science and Regenerative Medicine in Bangalore, India. Rams saw potential and scope for future developmental prospects in terms of raising the standards of resource commitment and quality of research in India on a global scale.

With the financial support of DBT, Ramaswamy set up Centre for Cellular and Molecular Platforms in 2009. This center was established to translate research and develop tools which can be used by the researchers and innovators from the industry and institutions affiliated under public domain.

== Research ==
He leads a lab at inStem which hosts research associates, post-doctoral fellows, doctoral students, project assistants and short-term student interns. The lab's primary interested in understanding how atomic resolution structural information affects biological function. The lab is running projects in collaboration with groups from USA, Sweden, and Argentina. He is well known for his structural enzymology work on Rieske non-heme iron oxygenases and Alcohol Dehydrogenases

His research on cockroach protein gain lot of popularity in the scientific community and the media. Rams envisions cockroach protein as a superfood due to its high calorific content and the presence of other essential biomolecules like fats and carbohydrates embedded in the quaternary structure of the protein. Studies have shown that one cockroach protein crystals contain more than three times the energy found in an equivalent amount of buffalo milk. He and his team think that it could alleviate the food shortages around the globe if it could be commercialized as supplements. It is also conceptualized as space food due to its high calorific content over small quantity and stability, making it ideal for storage at spacecraft and consumption by the astronauts during long-duration space missions. Currently, the team is trying to produce the crystals in bucket loads using yeast recombinant protein expression system rather than extracting crystals from cockroach's gut.

Other prime topics of his research interest involve understanding the structure-function correlations of Nucleotide Sugar transporters and Eukaryotic rieske oxygenases. Apart from these, there are numerous other projects carried out in his lab which can be found here.

== Selected publications ==
Rams's research findings have been published in a number of peer-reviewed journals. His research findings can be accessed online in repositories like PubMed, PubMed Central and ResearchGate. Some of his notable works are mentioned as follows:

- Ghosh, Swagatha; Yu, Chi-Li; Ferraro, Daniel J.; Sudha, Sai; Pal, Samir Kumar; Schaefer, Wayne F.; Gibson, David T.; Ramaswamy, S. (11 October 2016). "Blue protein with red fluorescence". Proceedings of the National Academy of Sciences of the United States of America. 113 (41): 11513–11518. Bibcode:2016PNAS..11311513G. doi:10.1073/pnas.1525622113. ISSN 1091-6490. PMC 5068307. PMID 27688756.
- Banerjee, Sanchari; Coussens, Nathan P.; Gallat, François-Xavier; Sathyanarayanan, Nitish; Srikanth, Jandhyam; Yagi, Koichiro J.; Gray, James S. S.; Tobe, Stephen S.; Stay, Barbara (1 July 2016). "Structure of a heterogeneous, glycosylated, lipid-bound, in vivo-grown protein crystal at atomic resolution from the viviparous cockroachDiploptera punctata". IUCrJ. 3 (4): 282–293. Bibcode:2016IUCrJ...3..282B. doi:10.1107/s2052252516008903. ISSN 2052-2525. PMC 4937783. PMID 27437115.
- Upadhyay, Atul K.; Chacko, Anita R.; Gandhimathi, A.; Ghosh, Pritha; Harini, K.; Joseph, Agnel P.; Joshi, Adwait G.; Karpe, Snehal D.; Kaushik, Swati (28 August 2015). "Genome sequencing of herb Tulsi ( Ocimum tenuiflorum ) unravels key genes behind its strong medicinal properties". BMC Plant Biology. 15 (1): 212. Bibcode:2015BMCPB..15..212U. doi:10.1186/s12870-015-0562-x. ISSN 1471-2229. PMC 4552454. PMID 26315624.
- Karlsson, Andreas; Parales, Juanito V.; Parales, Rebecca E.; Gibson, David T.; Eklund, Hans; Ramaswamy, S. (14 February 2003). "Crystal structure of naphthalene dioxygenase: side-on binding of dioxygen to iron". Science. 299 (5609): 1039–1042. Bibcode:2003Sci...299.1039K. doi:10.1126/science.1078020. ISSN 1095-9203. PMID 12586937. S2CID 24024404.
- Kauppi, B; Lee, K; Carredano, E; et al. (1998). "Structure of an aromatic-ring-hydroxylating dioxygenase-naphthalene 1,2-dioxygenase". Structure. 6 (5): 571–86. doi:10.1016/s0969-2126(98)00059-8. PMID 9634695.
- Iwata, So; Lee, Joong W.; Okada, Kengo; Lee, John Kyongwon; Iwata, Momi; Rasmussen, Bjarne; Link, Thomas A.; Ramaswamy, S.; Jap, Bing K. (3 July 1998). "Complete Structure of the 11-Subunit Bovine Mitochondrial Cytochrome bc1 Complex". Science. 281 (5373): 64–71. Bibcode:1998Sci...281...64I. doi:10.1126/science.281.5373.64. ISSN 0036-8075. PMID 9651245.

== Awards and honours ==
- UIRF Inventors award 2015
