= Wrocław County =

Coordinates: 51°07′N 17°02′E

Wrocław County Powiat wrocławski
- County
- Flag Coat of arms

- Location within the voivodeship
- Country: Poland
- Voivodeship: Lower Silesian
- Seat: Wrocław
- Gminas: Total 9: Gmina Czernica; Gmina Długołęka; Gmina Jordanów Śląski; Gmina Kąty Wrocławskie; Gmina Kobierzyce; Gmina Mietków; Gmina Siechnice; Gmina Sobótka; Gmina Żórawina

Area
  - Total: 1,116.2 km^{2} (431.0 sq mi)

Population (2019-06-30)
  - Total: 148,663
  - Density: 133.19/km^{2} (344.95/sq mi)
  - Urban: 22,088
  - Rural: 126,575
- Car plates: DWR
- Website: www.powiatwroclawski.pl

Wrocław County (Polish: powiat wrocławski) is a unit of territorial administration and local government (powiat) in Lower Silesian Voivodeship, south-western Poland. It came into being on January 1, 1999, as a result of the Polish local government reforms passed in 1998. The county covers an area of 1,116 square kilometres (431 sq mi). Its administrative seat is the city of Wrocław, although this city is not part of the county (it forms a separate city county). Wrocław County consists of areas to the east and south of Wrocław (city with county rights), and contains three towns: Sobótka, Kąty Wrocławskie and Siechnice.

As of 2019 the total population of the county is 148,663, out of which the population of Siechnice is 8,113, that of Kąty Wrocławskie is 6,994, that of Sobótka is 6,981, and the rural population is 126,575.

== Neighbouring counties ==
Apart from the city of Wrocław, Wrocław County is also bordered by Trzebnica County to the north, Oleśnica County to the east, Oława County to the south-east, Strzelin County to the south, Dzierżoniów County and Świdnica County to the south-west, and Środa County to the west.

== Administrative divisions ==
The county is subdivided into nine gminas (three urban-rural and six rural). These are listed in the following table, in descending order of population.

| Gmina | Type | Area (km^{2}) | Population (2019) | Seat |
|---|---|---|---|---|
| Gmina Długołęka | rural | 212.4 | 33,022 | Długołęka |
| Gmina Kąty Wrocławskie | urban-rural | 176.5 | 24,927 | Kąty Wrocławskie |
| Gmina Siechnice | urban-rural | 98.6 | 22,396 | Siechnice |
| Gmina Kobierzyce | rural | 149.1 | 21,503 | Kobierzyce |
| Gmina Czernica | rural | 84.2 | 16,070 | Czernica |
| Gmina Sobótka | urban-rural | 135.4 | 12,854 | Sobótka |
| Gmina Żórawina | rural | 120.1 | 10,967 | Żórawina |
| Gmina Mietków | rural | 83.3 | 3,767 | Mietków |
| Gmina Jordanów Śląski | rural | 56.6 | 3,157 | Jordanów Śląski |
