= Bismarck monument =

Monuments to Prince Otto Von Bismarck

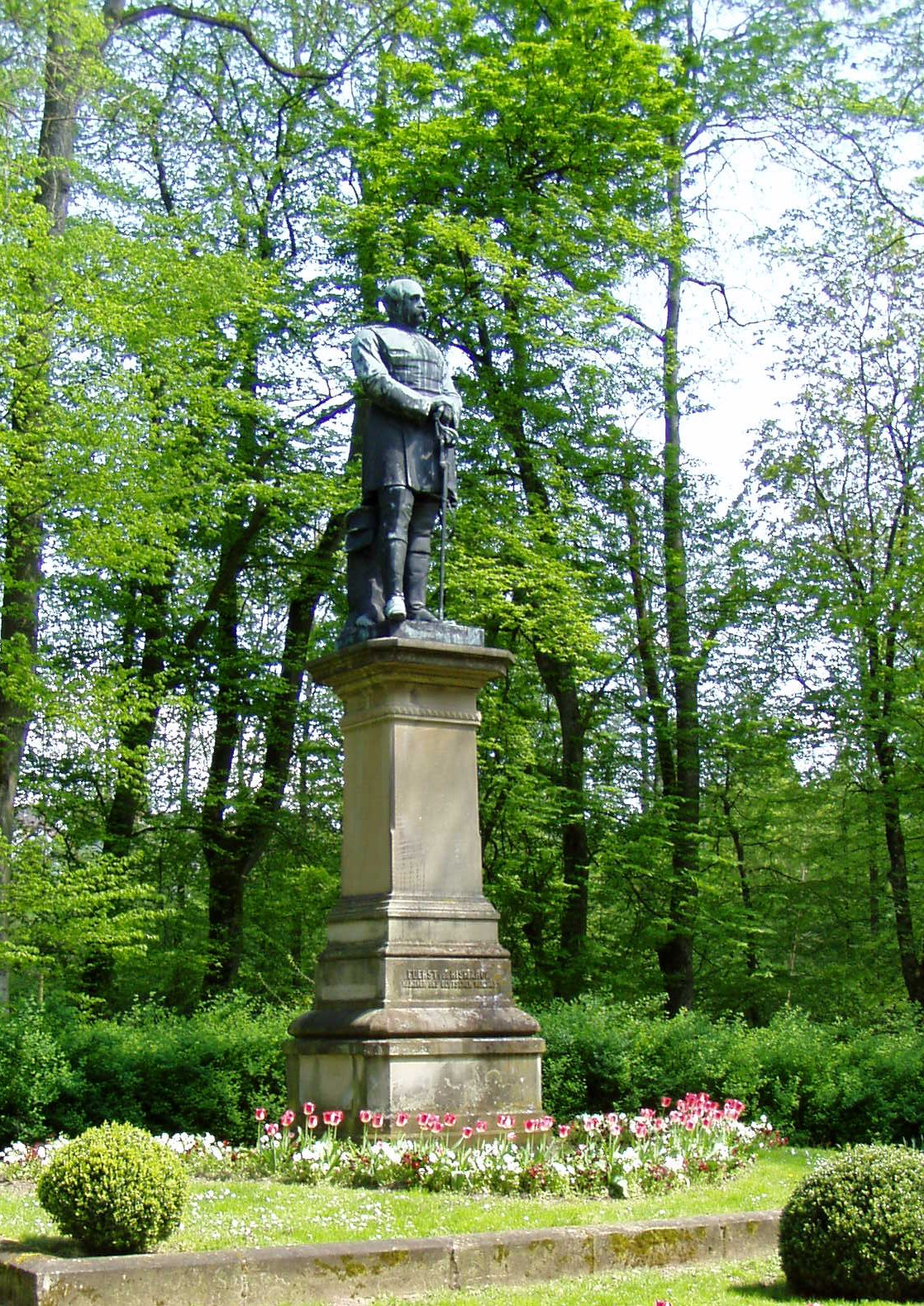
The Bismarck Monument (Bad Kissingen), the first Bismarck statue in Germany, erected in 1877 in Bad Kissingen

From 1868 onwards, Bismarck monuments were erected in many parts of the German Empire in honour of the long-serving Prussian minister-president and first German Reichskanzler, Prince Otto von Bismarck. Today some of these monuments are on the soil of other countries including France, Poland and Russia as well as the former German colonies on other continents.

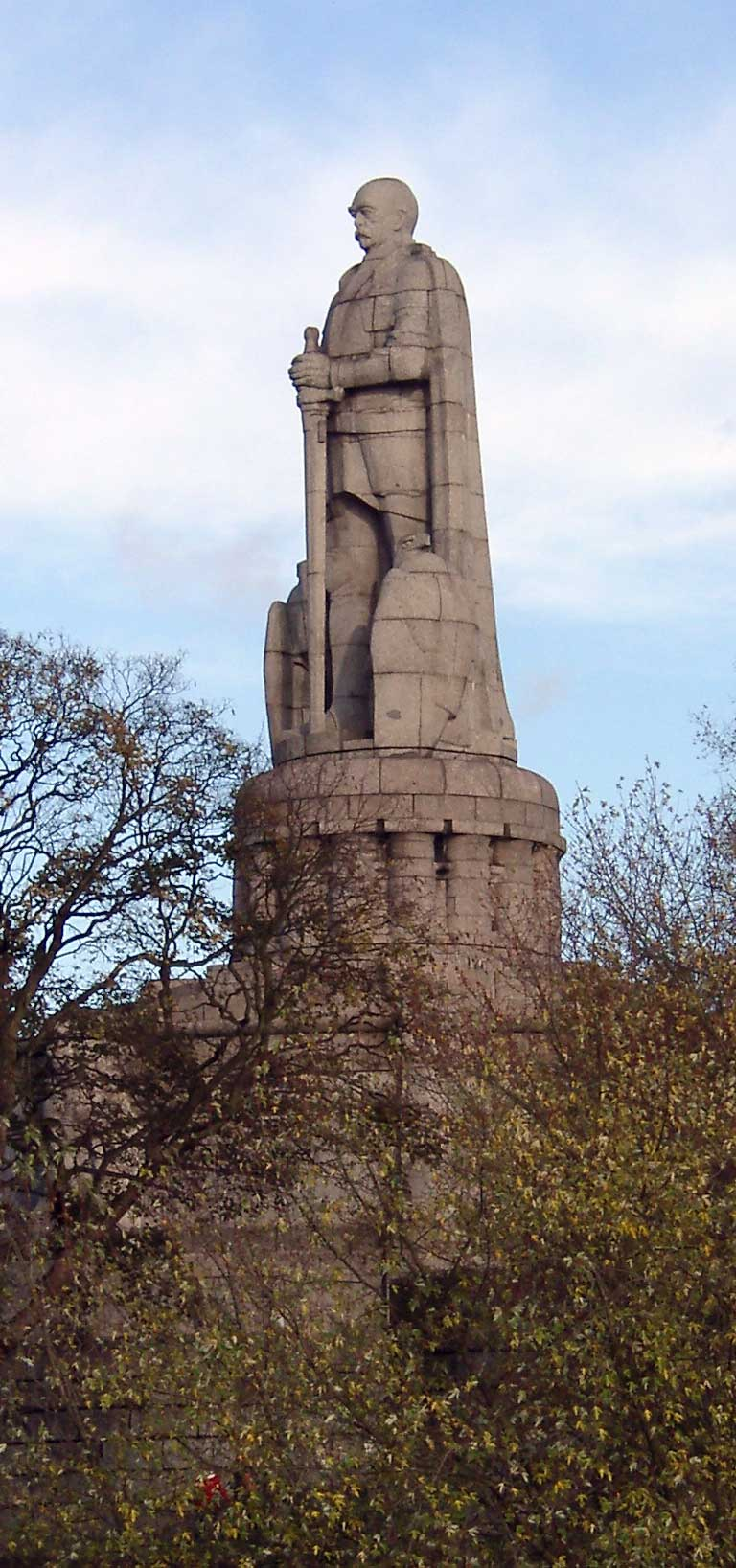
The Bismarck Monument in Hamburg (1906). Total height: 34.3 m. Height of statue: 14.8 m.

== History ==
=== Importance ===
The Bismarck monuments were the most visible and permanent expression of the veneration of Bismarck within the Empire. The size and cost of these symbols ranged from commemorative plaques to large monuments incorporating several groups of figures such as the Bismarck Memorial in Berlin. The flood of Bismarck monuments of all kinds constituted the third major wave of monument building in the German Empire after the warrior and victory monuments for the so-called Wars of Unification of 1864, 1866 and 1870–71, and the Emperor William monuments.

=== Monuments before 1871 ===
Even before the unification of Germany, in the days of the North German Confederation, monuments were built in honour of Bismarck. The first Bismarck Monument, a 12 metre high obelisk, was erected in 1868 in Gross-Peterwitz in Silesia. A year later, a Bismarck tower was opened as an observation tower in Ober-Johnsdorf in Silesia. Both monuments were the result of private initiatives. While the obelisk has since been destroyed, the Bismarck tower still exists, albeit in ruins. See Bismarck Tower, Janówek.

=== Monuments from 1871 to 1890 ===
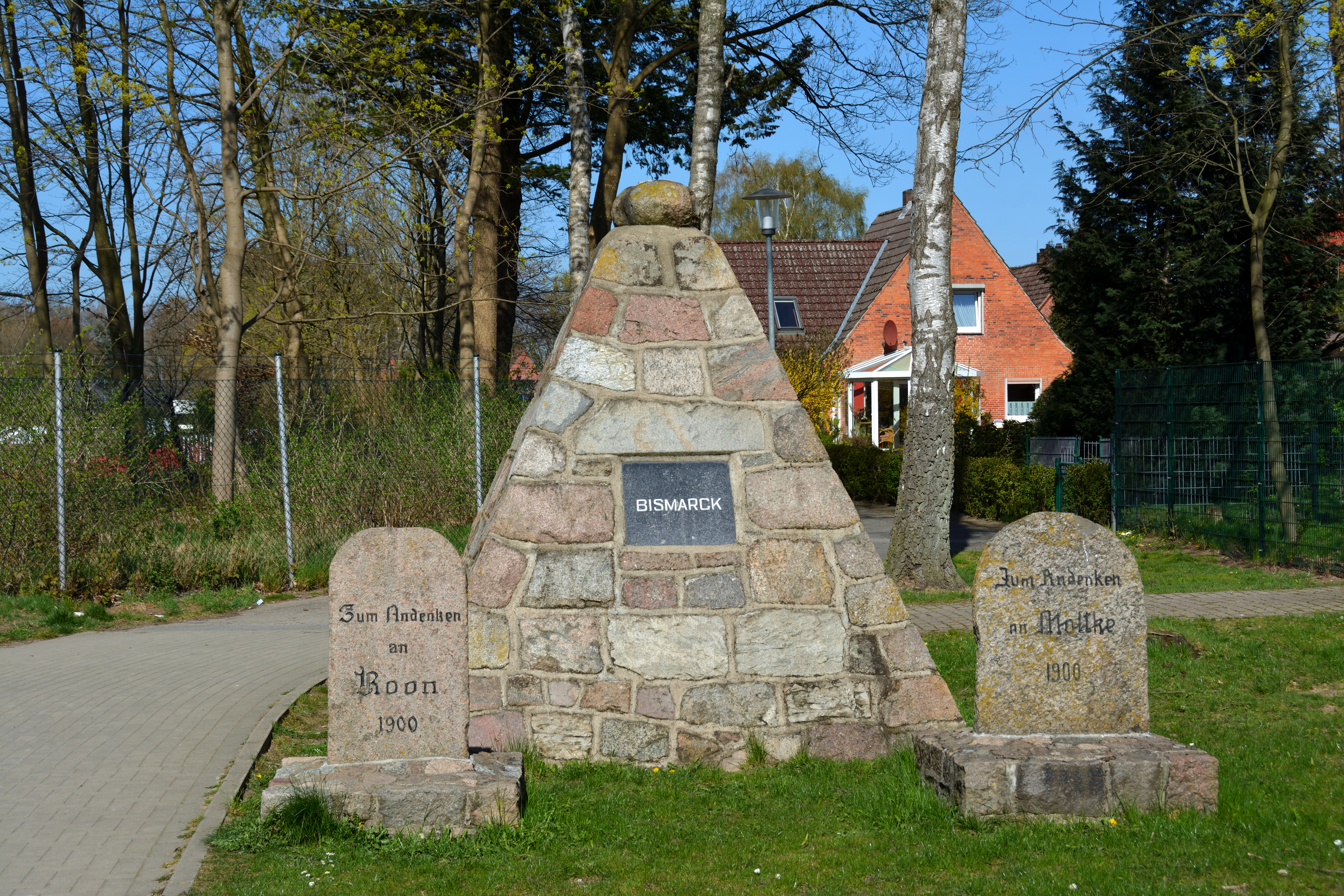
Bismarck, Roon and Moltke in Hohenlockstedt

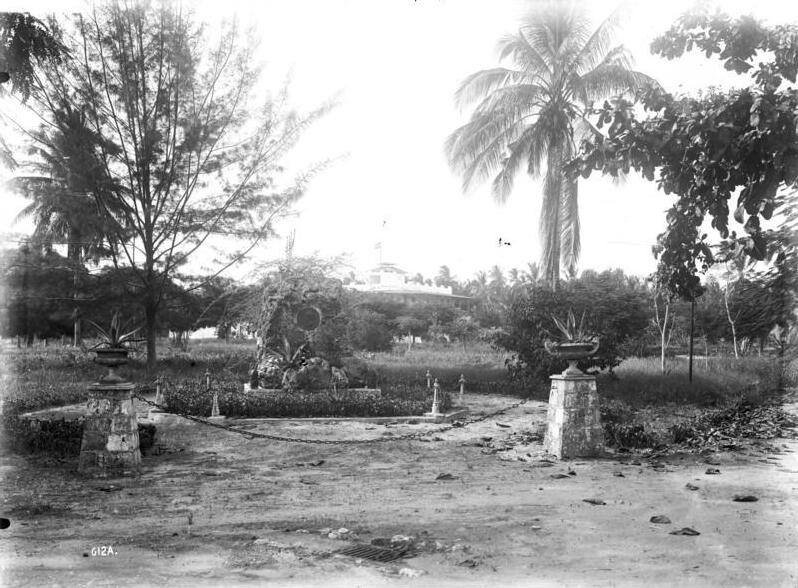
Bismarck Monument in Pangani German East Africa 1906

Shortly after the unification of Germany in 1871 Bismarck became a subject for monuments. Frequently Bismarck was not honoured with a monument by himself, but was honoured together with other figures from the wars of 1866 and 1870–71 and those people involved in the unification of the Empire, such as Emperor William I, Crown Prince Frederick William, Moltke and Roon in the large number of victory or Empire monuments built after 1871 in many places.

The first public statues of Bismarck were taken from 1877 onwards (such as the indirect portrayal on the Canossa Column at Bad Harzburg). The first monument that displayed a full-size Bismarck, was the Bismarck Monument (Bad Kissingen) erected in 1877 in Bad Kissingen (Hausen). Initially the most frequently encountered monuments were bronze busts or statues. In most cases, they portrayed on a high plinth, an oversized cast statue of Bismarck as a military figure in the uniform of a cuirassier, based on the prototype of the second Bismarck statue unveiled in 1879 in Cologne. The central squares of cities were usually decorated with these monuments. In addition, over thirty Bismarck fountains were built. Bismarck monuments were erected on all continents, mostly in the German colonies, but also in countries with German emigrants, such as USA and Brazil.

=== Monuments from 1890 to 1898 ===
Immediately after Bismarck's dismissal in 1890 committees were founded in several places to plan the erection of commemorative monuments. The number of monument settings now increased gradually. Simultaneously new types of monument were conceived. A few monuments showed Bismarck as a private person as e. g. the Leipzig Bismarck Monument, which portrays him as a hunter with his dog, Tyras.

Increasingly, Bismarck towers were built in a medieval style instead of the conventional busts or statues. Unlike the latter, these were erected out in the countryside on high points.

=== Monuments and Bismarck Towers after 1898 ===
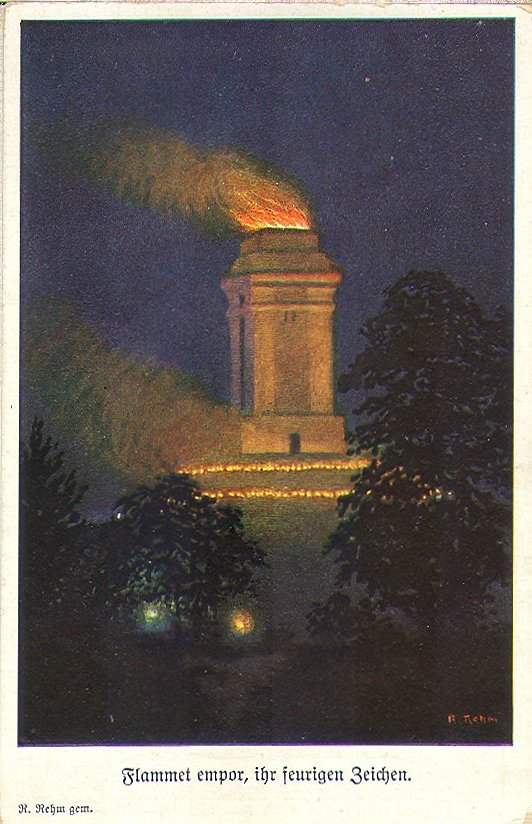
Götterdämmerung tower type

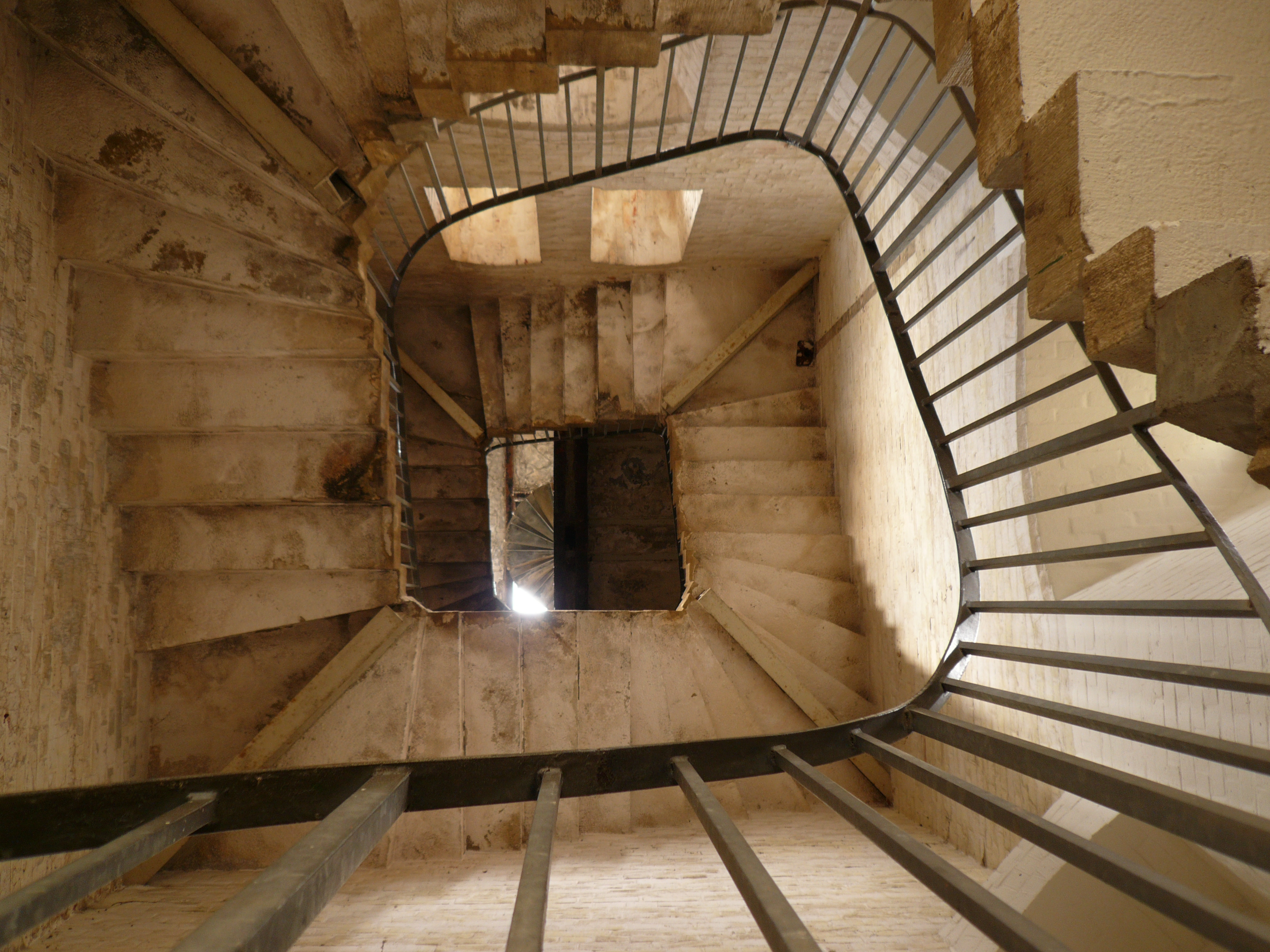
Staircase in a Götterdämmerung-type Bismarck tower (Hildesheim)

After his death in 1898 Bismarck's already enormous popularity increased further and, with that, the number of monument projects. The year 1898 also represented a turning point in their design. On many examples the figure of Bismarck was shown in a medieval-looking armour instead of the usual contemporary costume. The design language of the monuments was often more archaic and considerably more architectural monuments were built.

In 1899 (i.e. one year after Bismarck's death), Wilhelm Kreis created a fundamental tower design, known as Götterdämmerung ("Twilight of the Gods") for a competition by the German Student Union in the shape of a massive pillar of fire. This won the award by the competition's initiators and was built 47 times until 1911, thus becoming a standard form. In many places, however, there are variations of this design. The feature of these solid structures was the idea from the Student's Union that, on the top of all Bismarck columns, braziers would be built so that, on certain days, they could be lit in honour of former Chancellor, forming a network of beacons across Germany. Firing facilities were installed on 167 Bismarck towers. Because a common day of lighting the towers could not be agreed (Bismarck's birthday was on 1 April during the holidays), this idea did not take off. The Bismarck columns were mostly financed by donations (mainly from the middle class). As a building material, rock from the local area was used (for example, granite or sandstone). A total of 240 Bismarck towers were built as observation towers and beacons.

The highlight of all Bismarck monuments was meant to be the National Bismarck Memorial on the Elisenhöhe at Bingerbrück which was to be inaugurated on the centenary on 1 April 1915. Planning started in 1907 and, in 1910, a general competition was conducted. The project was never executed, however, due to the outbreak of the First World War. Many Bismarck monuments did not survive the Second World War and the subsequent political changes. They were smelted for ore, destroyed by bombing (in some cases, such as the Königsberg tower, intentionally for strategic purposes) or removed after 1945.

Today there are many places that preserve the remaining towers and Bismarck columns or raise funds for their renovation.

== Gallery ==
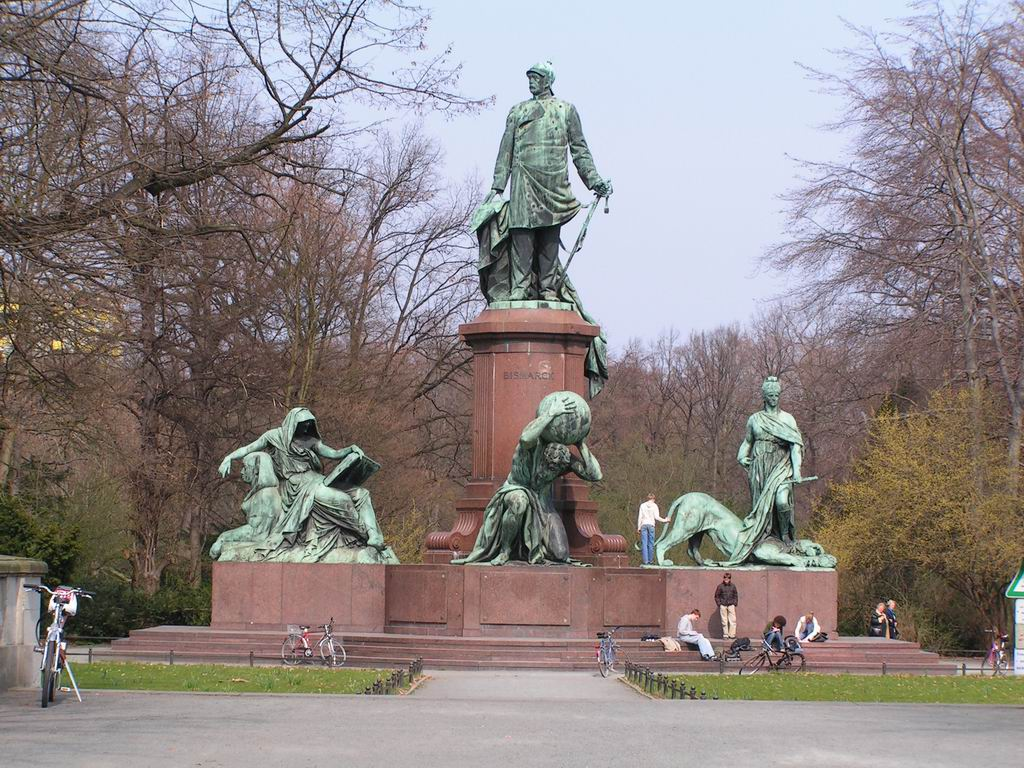
Bismarck Memorial in Berlin

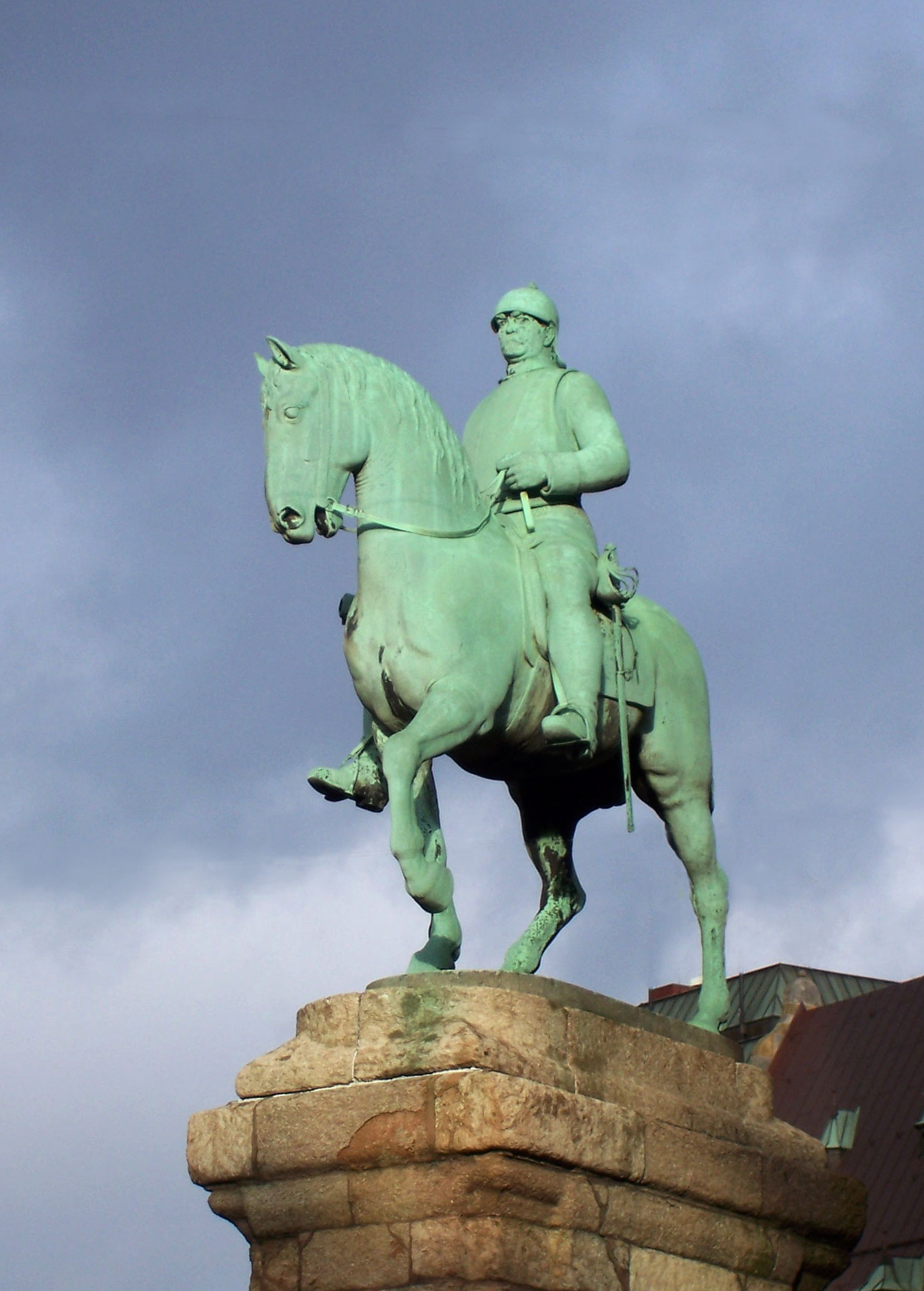
Equestrian statue of Bismarck near Bremen Cathedral

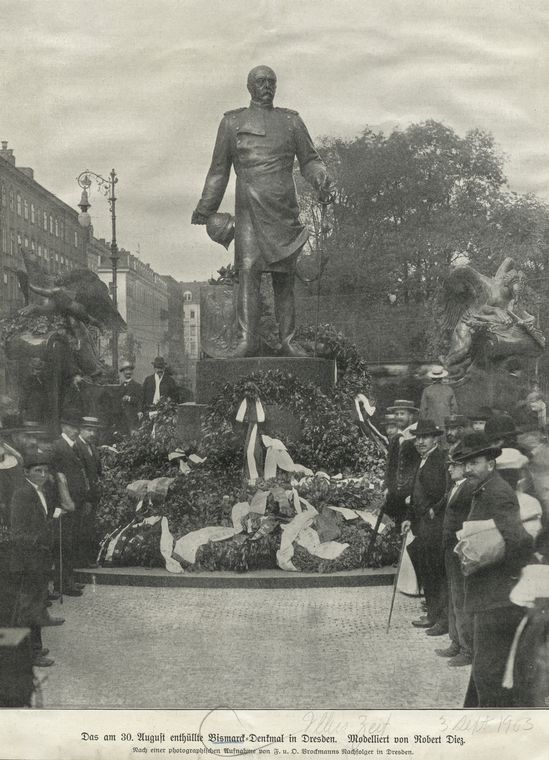
Dresden: Ceremonial unveiling of the Bismarck Monument by Robert Diez in 1903 (1946-1947 damaged and despoiled)

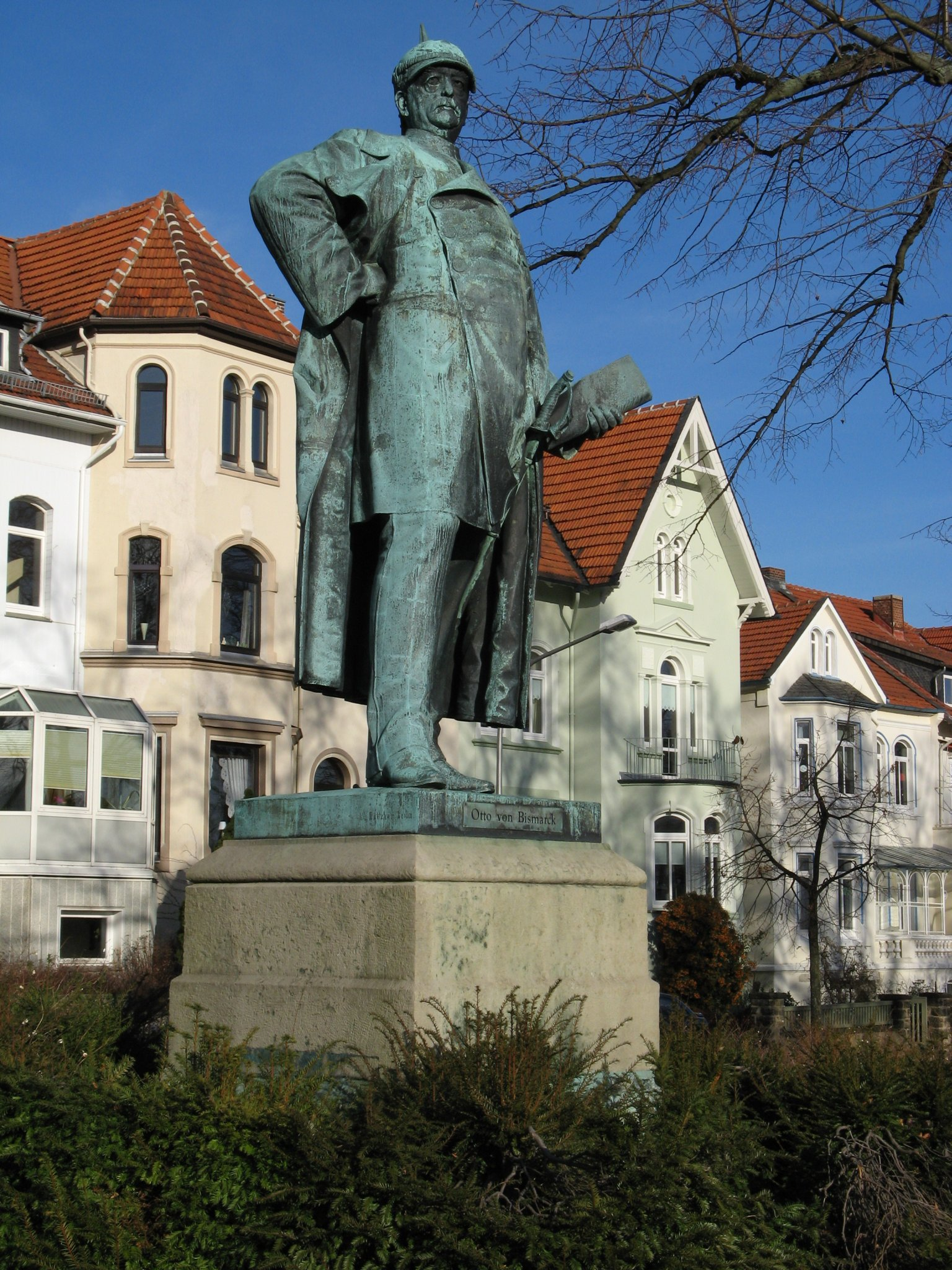
Bismarck Monument in Goslar

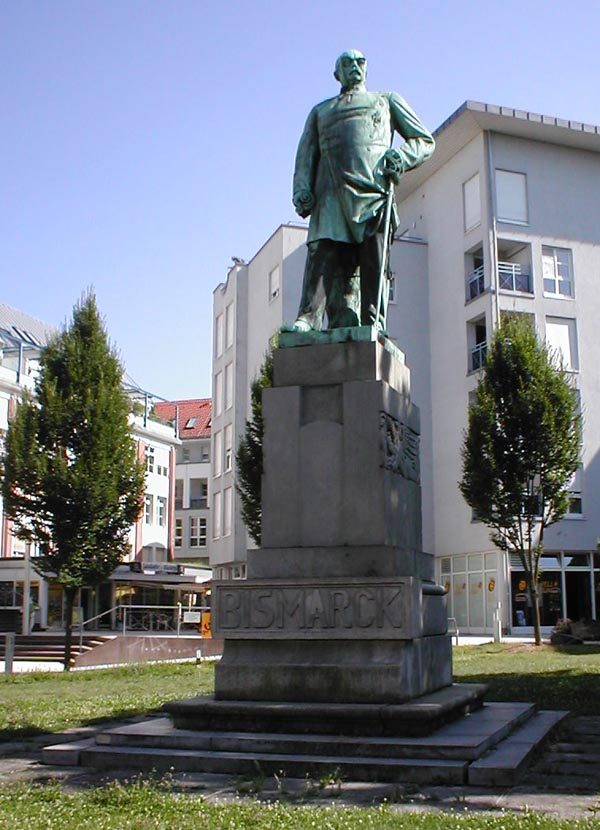
Bismarck Monument in Heilbronn

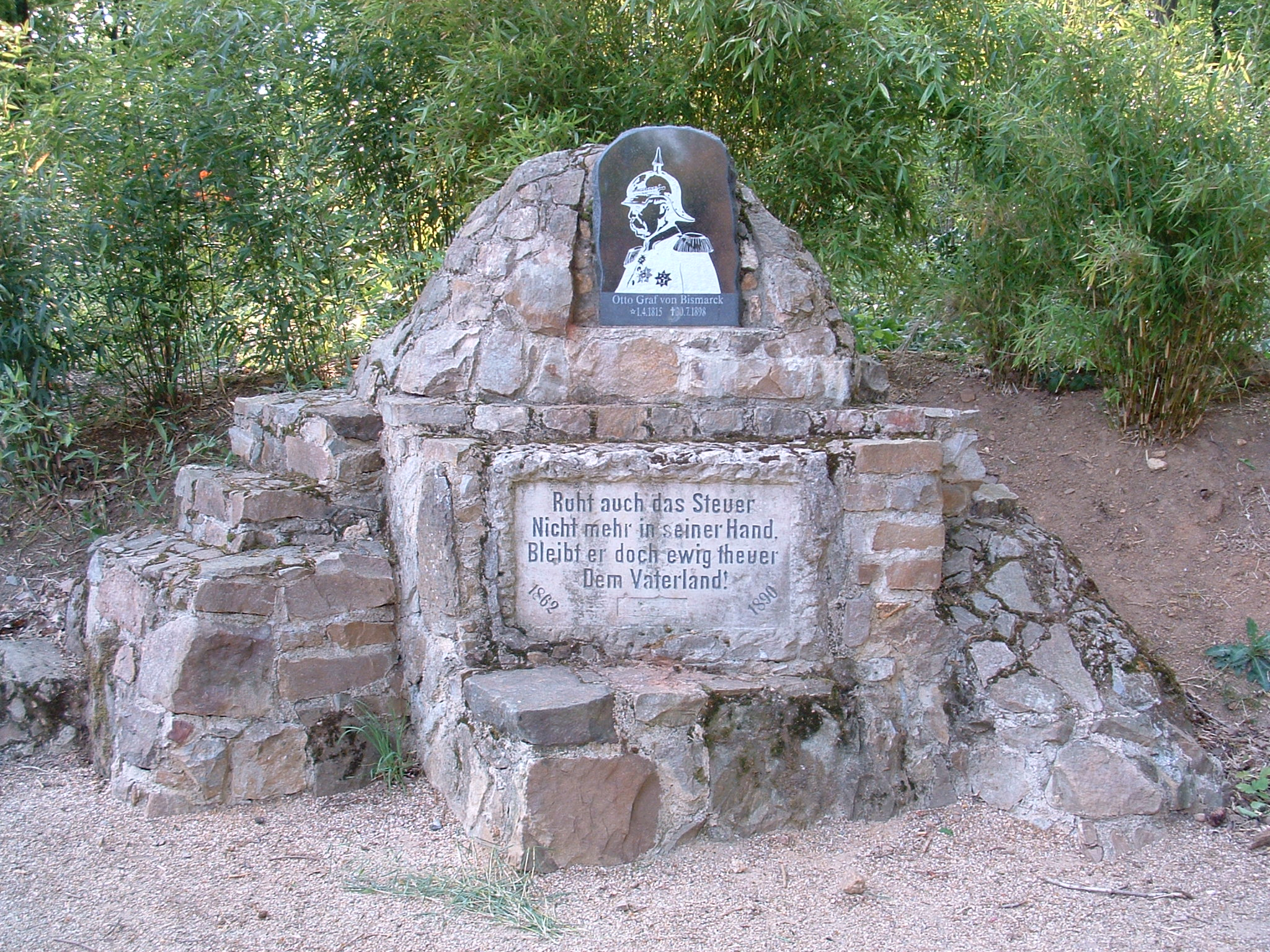
Langerwehe - Bismarck Monument im Kammerbusch landscape garden

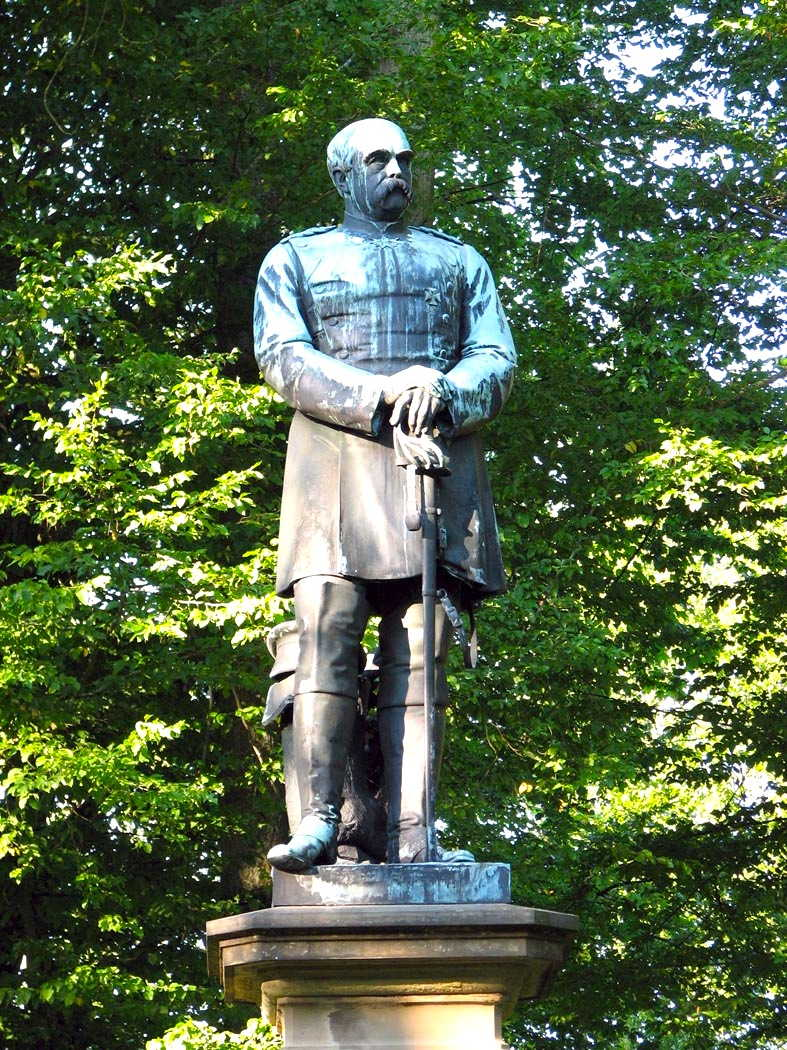
The Bismarck Statue in
Bad Kissingen

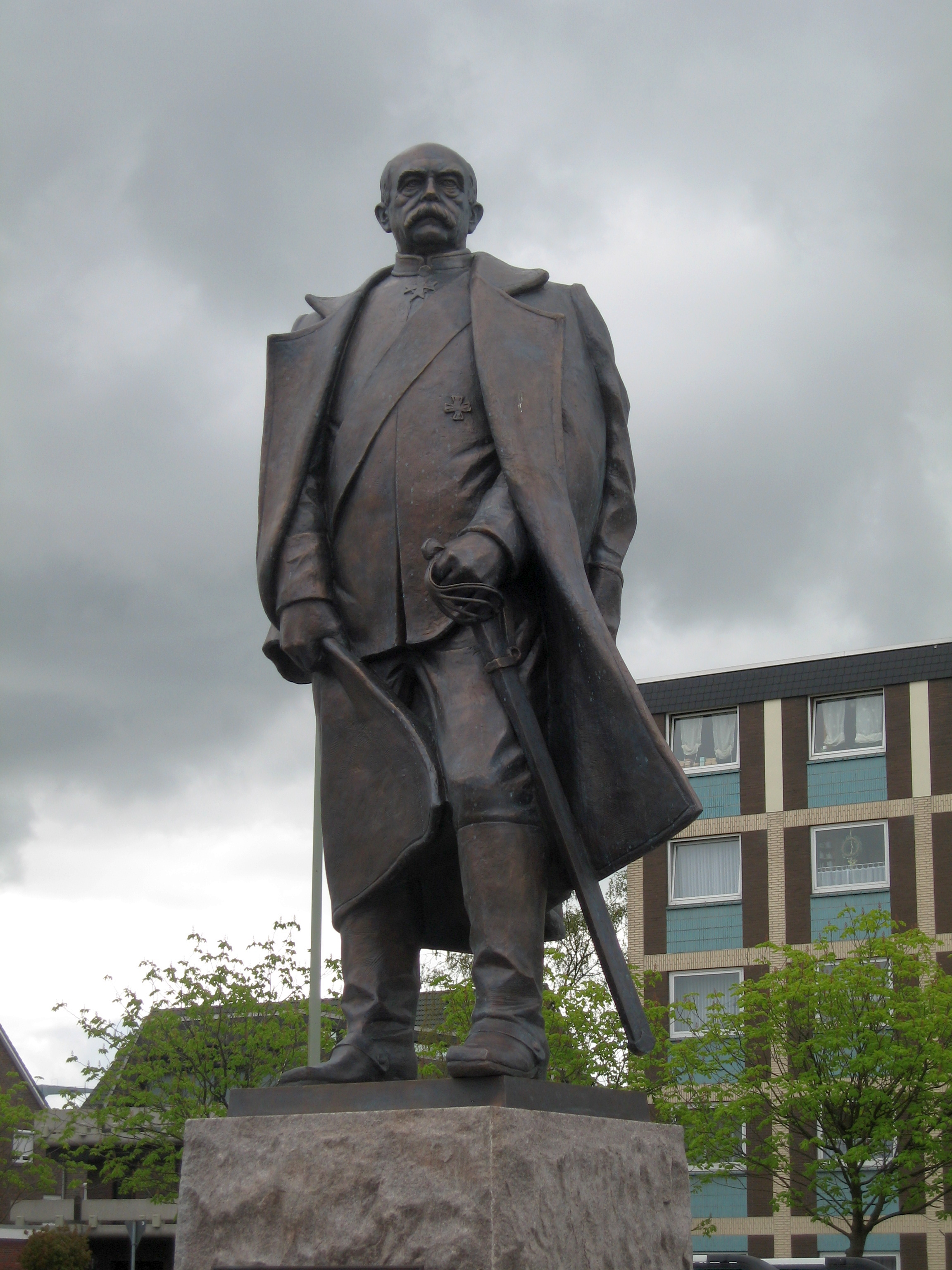
New Bismarck statue in Wilhelmshaven (2015)

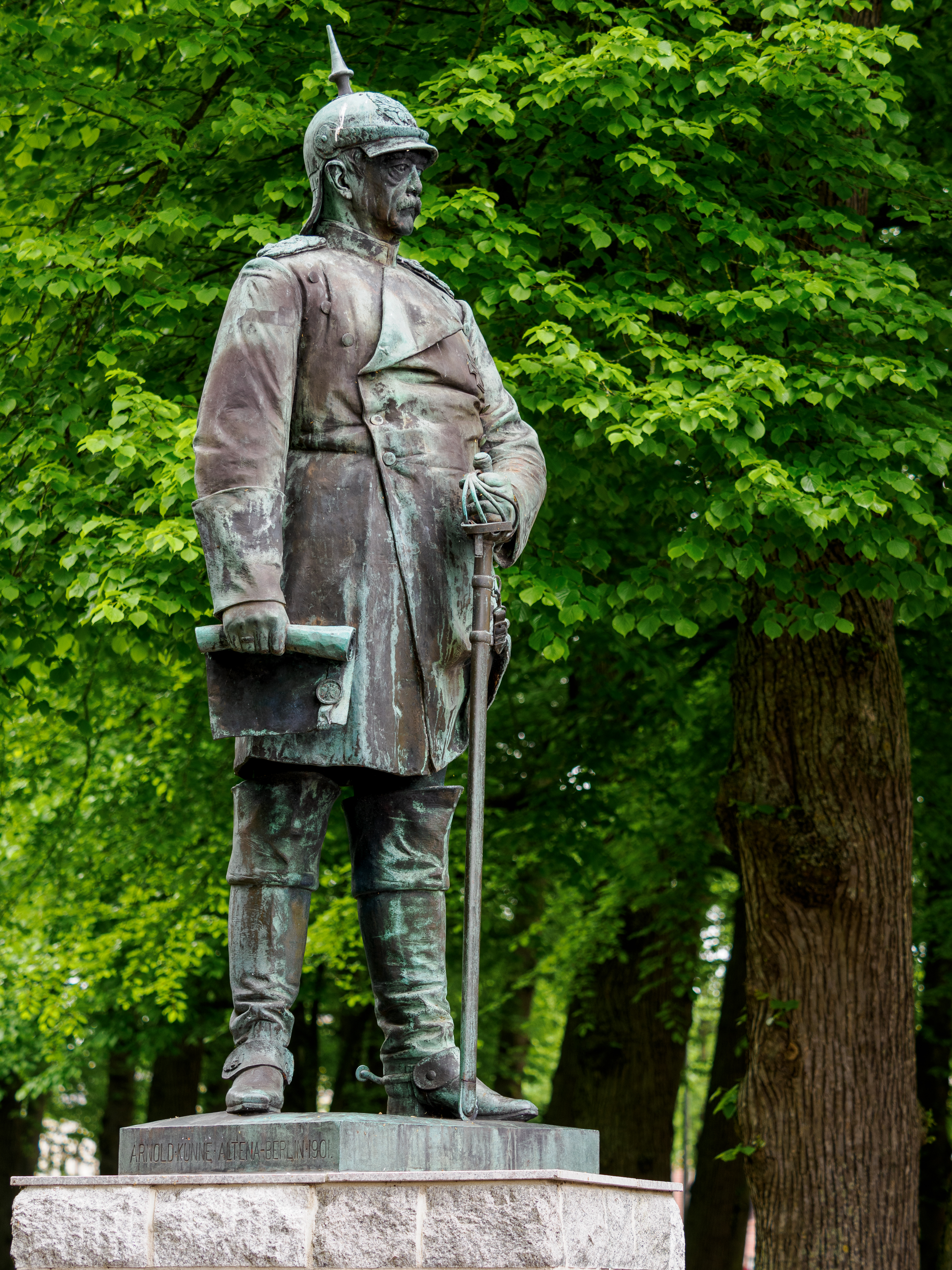
Bismarck Monument in Norden (East Frisia)

== See also ==
- Bismarck tower
- Bismarck Memorial
