= Herrengasse =

Street in Vienna, Austria

Coordinates: 48°12′35″N 16°21′57″E

The Herrengasse (meaning in German language: "Street of the Lords" or "Lords Lane") is a street in Vienna, located in the first district Innere Stadt.

== History ==
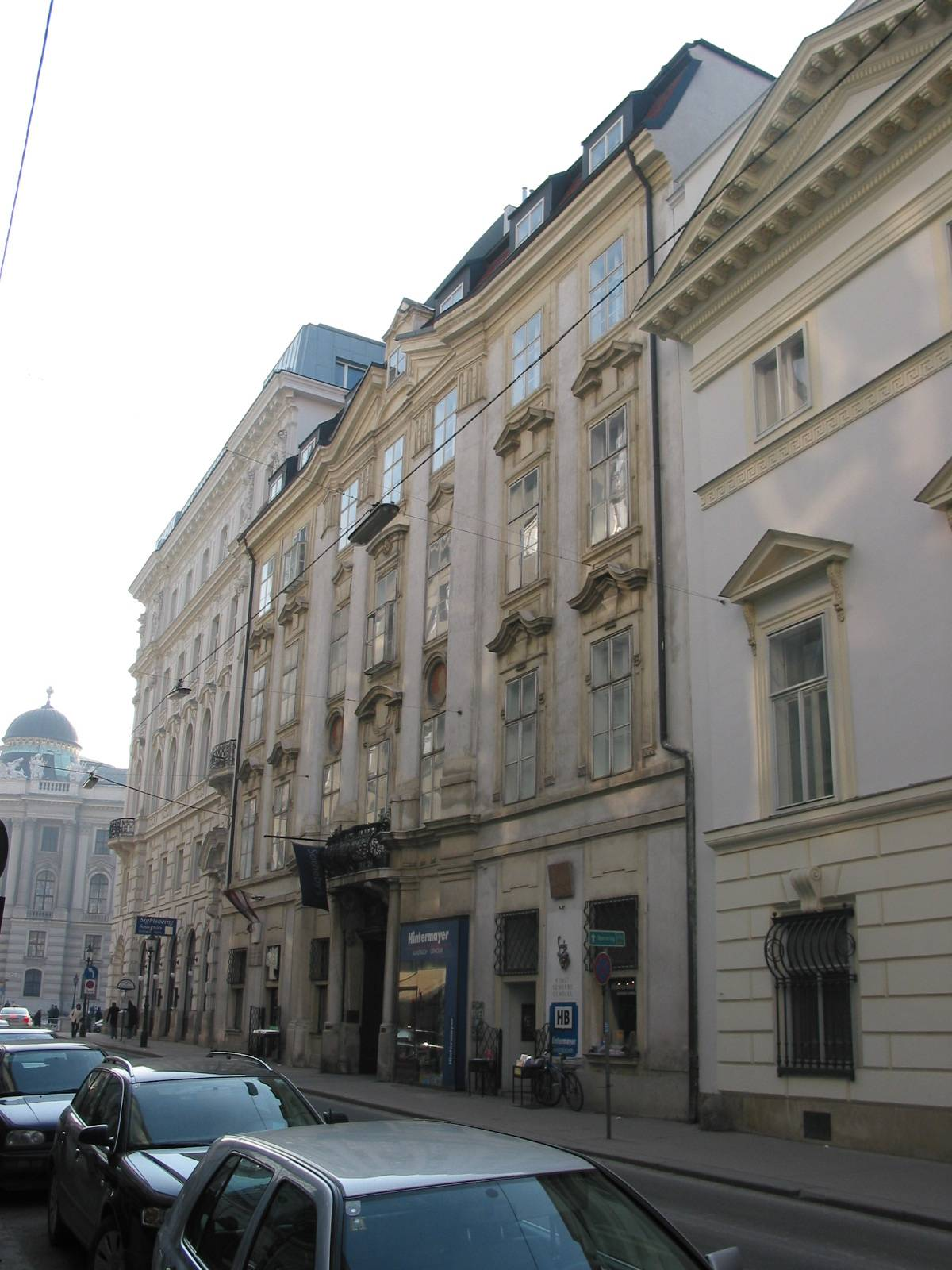
Palais Wilczek, Herrengasse 5

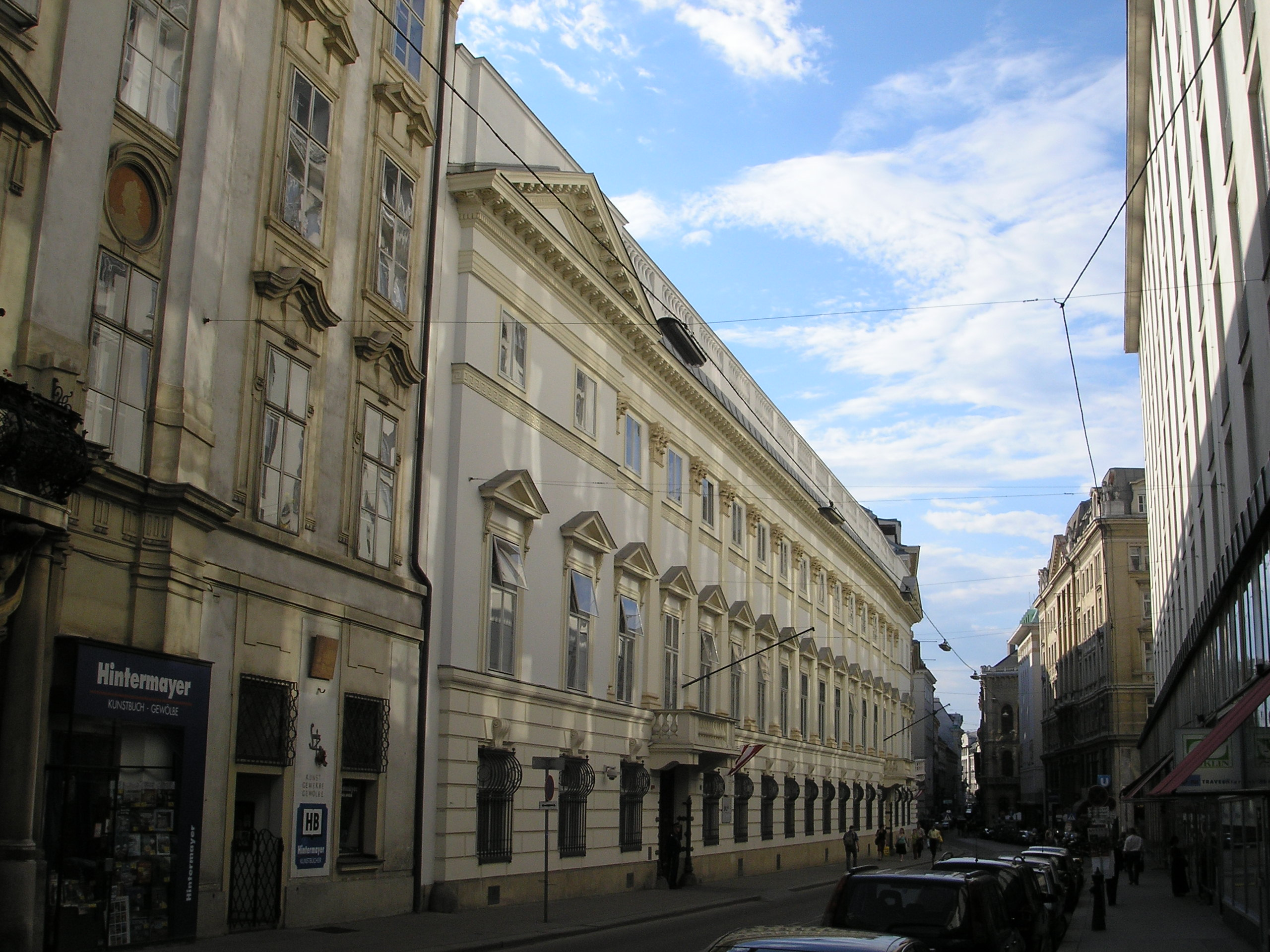
Palais Modena, Herrengasse 7

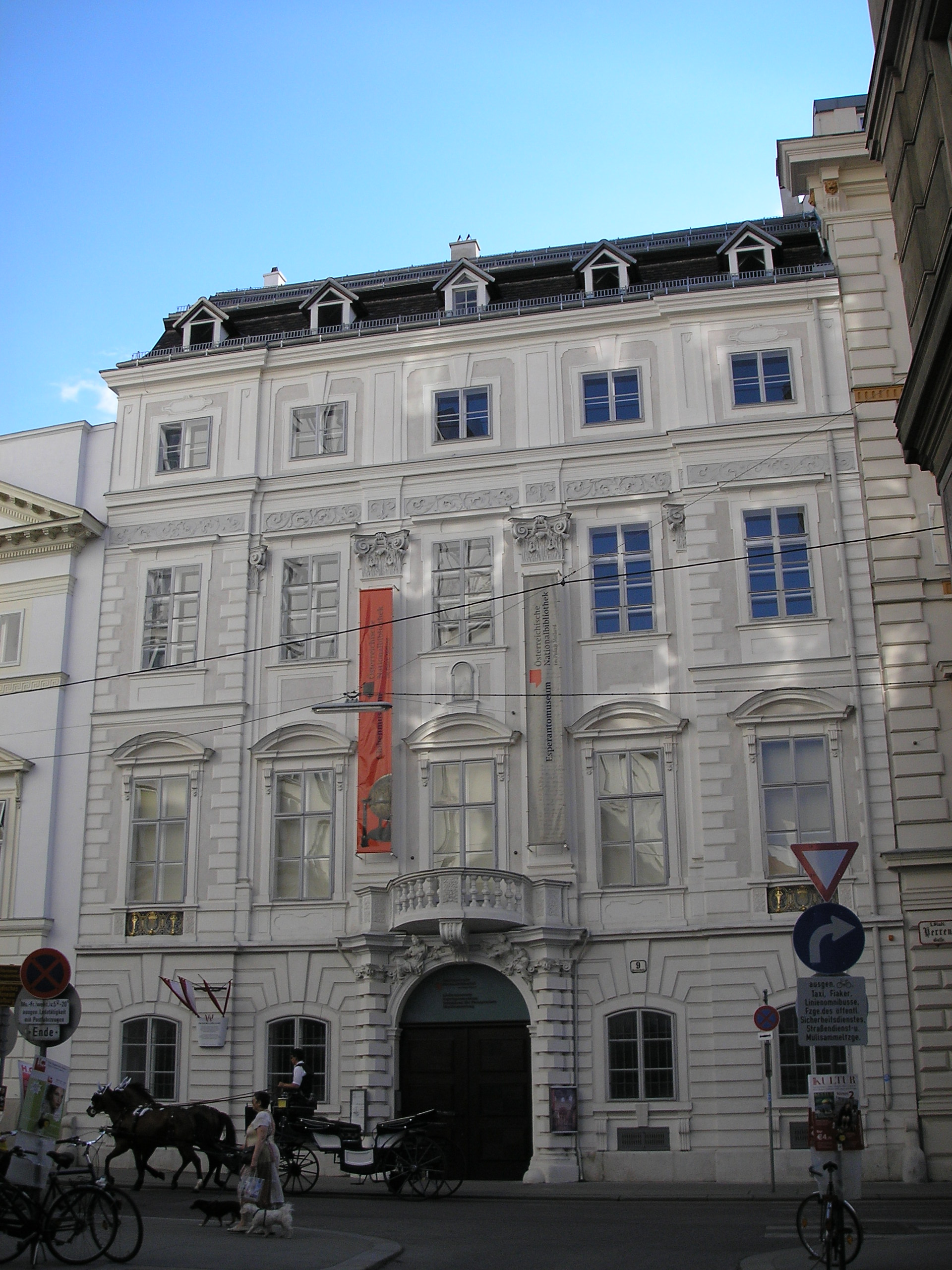
Palais Mollard-Clary, Herrengasse 9

The street existed during Roman times as part of the limes highway system. The first written mention of the street dates to 1216. The section of the street between the Freyung and Lobkowitzplatz squares was known during the Middle Ages as Hochstraße (High Street).

After Vienna began to establish itself as the imperial capital, the nobility (known in German as Herren or Lords) increasingly migrated to the city to be close to the Hofburg Imperial Palace, the residence of the Habsburg rulers. After the Estates of Lower Austria built their assembly house at the Palais Niederösterreich in 1513, the street was renamed Herrengasse.

== Palaces ==
The typical layout of a noble palace (Palais) was the entrance facing the street, sometimes set a little way back, with lush gardens located in the back away from public view. Some of the Palais had multiple entrances from different streets. The Herrengasse used to consist almost exclusively of noble palaces, though some were lost during the course of time. One of the Liechtenstein palaces, located at Herrengasse 8, housed the famous Bösendorfer-Konzertsaal, a concert hall established in 1872. Famous artists such as Franz Liszt, Anton Rubinstein, Joseph Hellmesberger Jr. and Hans von Bülow performed there. The palace was ripped down and replaced by a modernistic high-rise building in 1913.

After the dissolution of the Austro-Hungarian Empire in 1918 and the end of the Second World War in 1945, many aristocratic families had to give up their city homes due to rising costs of upkeep. Many of the buildings were either rented or sold for commercial usage as offices and museums, or bought by the government and used by ministries. The Herrengasse has nevertheless been able to retain most of its original appearance and relative exclusivity. The building's architectural style reaches from the Renaissance to the baroque and neo-baroque periods.

A direct subway connection to the U3 line has existed since the 1990s.

City palaces (known as Palais) which still exist include:

- Palais Herberstein (built in 1897, at Herrengasse 1-3)
- Palais Wilczek (former Palais Lembruch, 1737, Herrengasse 5)
- Palais Modena (today Federal Ministry of the Interior, 1811, Herrengasse 7)
- Palais Mollard-Clary (1689, Herrengasse 9)
- Palais Niederösterreich (formerly Niederösterreichisches Landeshaus [Estates House of Lower Austria], 1839–1848, Herrengasse 13)
- Palais Ferstel (formerly Austro-Hungarian Bank, 1856–1860, Herrengasse 14, entrance also at Freyung 2)
- Palais Batthyány (integrates parts of the former Palais Orsini-Rosenberg, 1716, Herrengasse 19)
- Palais Trauttmannsdorff (1834–1838, Herrengasse 21)
- Palais Porcia (1546, Herrengasse 23)

Right next to the Herrengasse is the Freyung square, where more aristocratic residences are located. Other noble palaces in the vicinity can be found at Minoritenplatz square.
