= Wilczkowice =

Wilczkowice may refer to:

- Wilczkowice, Lower Silesian Voivodeship (south-west Poland)
- Wilczkowice, Kraków County in Lesser Poland Voivodeship (south Poland)
- Wilczkowice, Oświęcim County in Lesser Poland Voivodeship (south Poland)
- Wilczkowice, Świętokrzyskie Voivodeship (south-central Poland)

== See also ==
- Wilczek (disambiguation)
