= Mleczna =

Mleczna may refer to the following places in Poland:

- Mleczna, Lower Silesian Voivodeship in Gmina Jordanów Śląski, SW Poland
- Mleczna (river), a river in central Poland
- Other places called Mleczna (listed in Polish Wikipedia)
