= Minoritenplatz =

Square in Vienna

Coordinates: 48°12′33.34″N 16°21′51.68″E

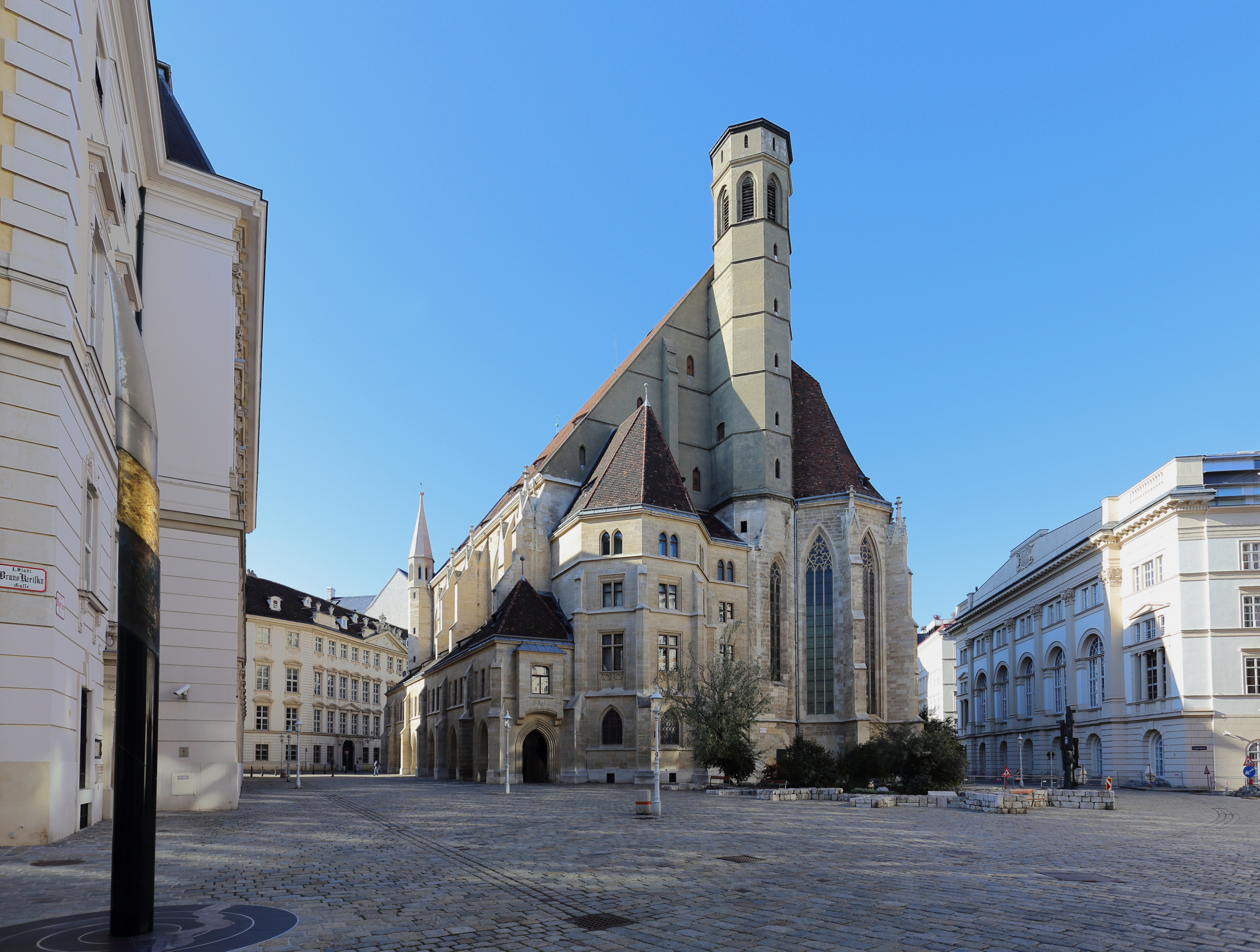
Minoritenplatz with Minoritenkirche

The Minoritenplatz is one of the oldest public squares in Vienna. It is located in the first district Innere Stadt, and is dominated by the Minoritenkirche church, after which the square is named. The church itself was constructed by the Greyfriars (Minoriten), after the Austrian Duke Leopold VI of Austria invited them to Austria in 1224. Since the square is in direct proximity to the Hofburg Imperial Palace, a number of aristocratic families took up residence in the square from the 16th to the 18th century.

City-palaces (Palais) located at the Minoritenplatz are:

- Palais Dietrichstein (constructed in the 17th century, located at Minoritenplatz 3)
- Palais Liechtenstein (1706, Minoritenplatz 4, entrance also at Bankgasse 9)
- Palais Starhemberg (1650-1661, Minoritenplatz 5)
- Palais Niederösterreich (1839-1848, Minoritenplatz 7, entrance also at Herrengasse 13)
- Landeshauptmannschaft (formerly Statthaltereigebäude, Minoritenplatz 9, entrance also at Herrengasse 11)

Located on Minoritenplatz 1 are the Austrian State Archives (Österreichisches Staatsarchiv), founded in the 15th century by Maximilian I, Holy Roman Emperor as the Family, Court and State Archive (Haus-, Hof- und Staatsarchiv). The building itself now only dates back to 1901. Close to the Archives is the Austrian Federal Ministry for Foreign Affairs, located at Minoritenplatz 8.

Small monuments to the artist Rudolf von Alt, the cleric Clemens Maria Hofbauer, and the politician Leopold Figl also decorate the square.

== See also ==
- Ballhausplatz
