= Glinica, Wrocław County =

Glinica
- Village
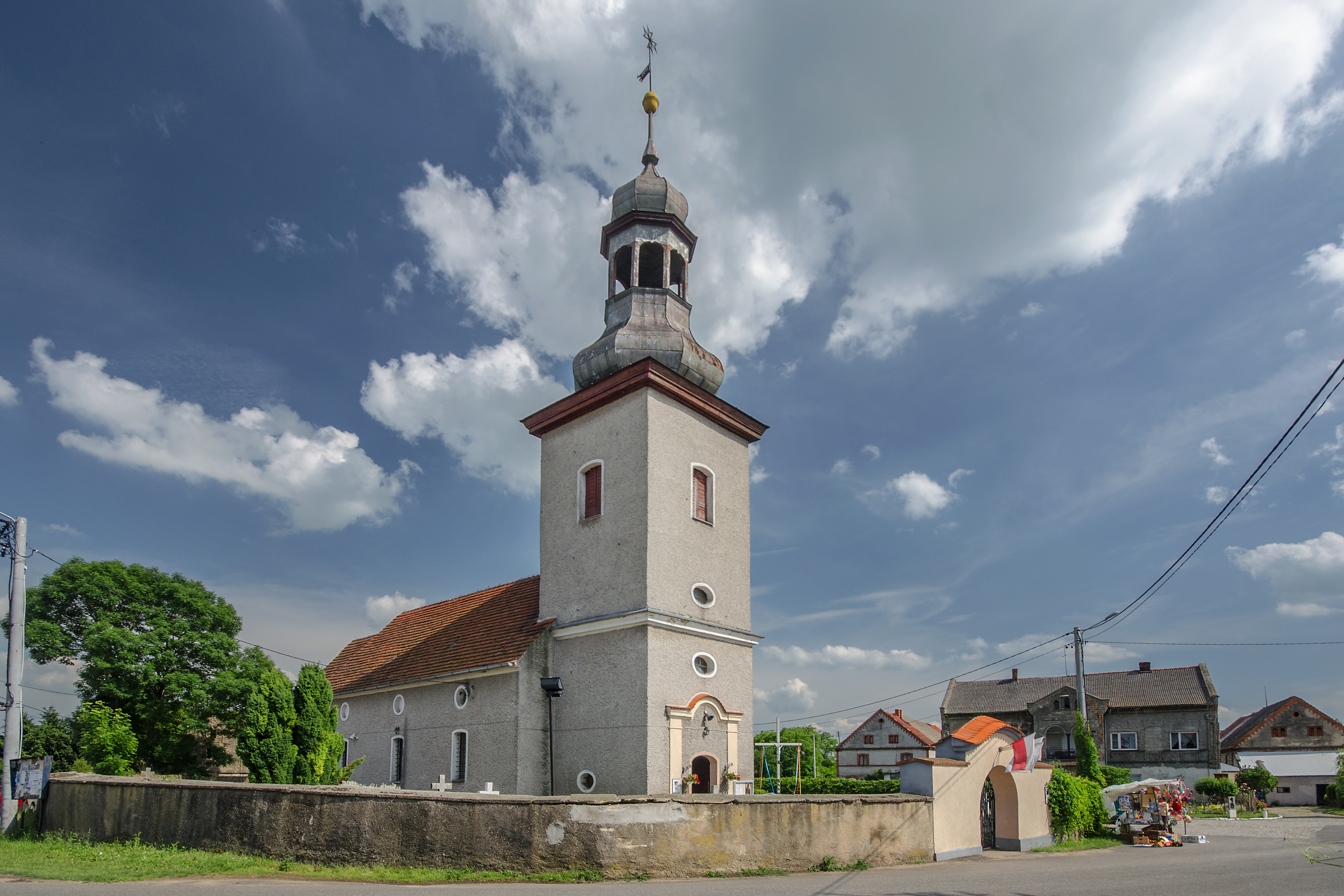
- Saints Anthony and Matthias church in Glinica

- Location within Poland
- Coordinates: 50°51′36″N 16°50′16″E
- Country: Poland
- Voivodeship: Lower Silesian
- County: Wrocław
- Gmina: Jordanów Śląski
- Population: 180
- Time zone: UTC+1 (CET)
  - Summer (DST): UTC+2 (CEST)
- Vehicle registration: DWR

Glinica [ɡliˈnit͡sa] is a village in the administrative district of Gmina Jordanów Śląski, within Wrocław County, Lower Silesian Voivodeship, in south-western Poland.
