= Wilczek =

Wilczek may refer to:

- Wilczek (surname), a Polish surname
- Palais Wilczek, a palace in Vienna
- Wilczek Land, a large island in the Russian Arctic
- Wilczek Island, a smaller island in the Russian Arctic
