= Jezierzyce Wielkie =

- Village
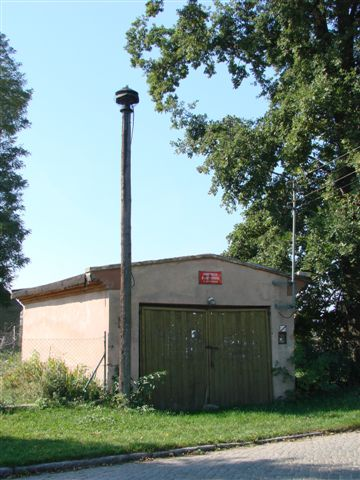

- Location within Poland
- Coordinates: 50°50′20″N 16°53′46″E
- Country: Poland
- Voivodeship: Lower Silesian
- County: Wrocław
- Gmina: Jordanów Śląski
- Time zone: UTC+1 (CET)
  - Summer (DST): UTC+2 (CEST)
- Vehicle registration: DWR

Jezierzyce Wielkie [jɛʑɛˈʐɨt͡sɛ ˈvjɛlkʲɛ] is a village in the administrative district of Gmina Jordanów Śląski, within Wrocław County, Lower Silesian Voivodeship, in south-western Poland.
