= Jordanów Śląski =

- Village
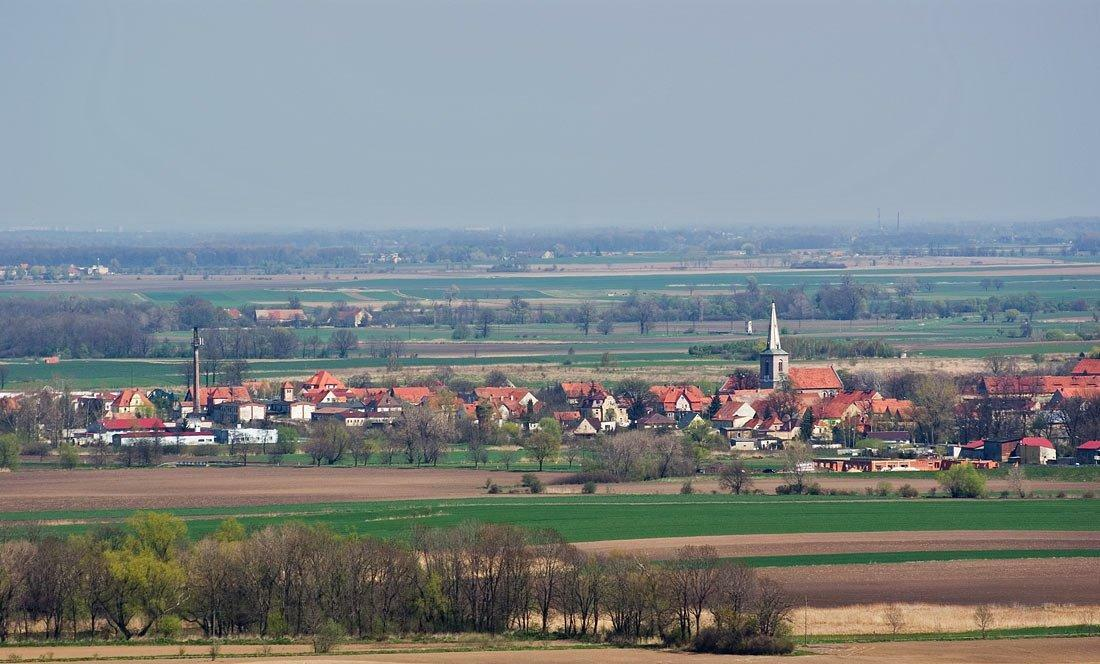
- Jordanów Śląski

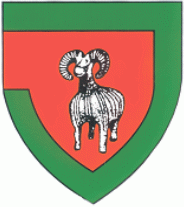
- Coat of arms

- Location within Poland
- Coordinates: 50°51′43″N 16°51′57″E
- Country: Poland
- Voivodeship: Lower Silesian
- County: Wrocław
- Gmina: Jordanów Śląski
- Population: 1,148

Jordanów Śląski (Polish pronunciation: [jɔrˈdanuf ˈɕlɔ̃skʲi]) is a village in Wrocław County, Lower Silesian Voivodeship, in south-western Poland. It is the seat of the administrative district (gmina) called Gmina Jordanów Śląski.
