= Popowice, Lower Silesian Voivodeship =

Popowice
- Village
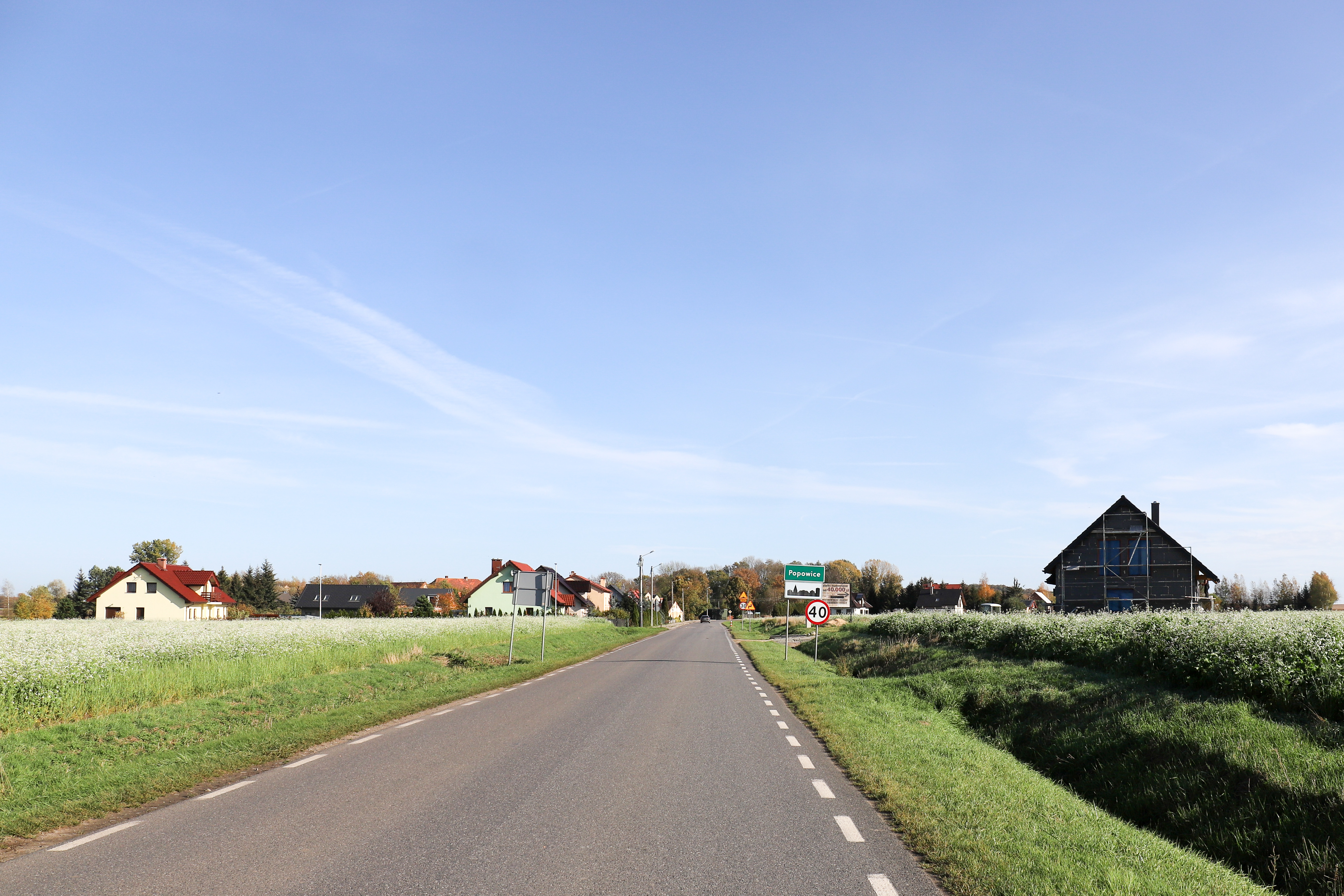

- Location within Poland
- Coordinates: 50°52′34″N 16°53′19″E
- Country: Poland
- Voivodeship: Lower Silesian
- County: Wrocław
- Gmina: Jordanów Śląski
- Time zone: UTC+1 (CET)
  - Summer (DST): UTC+2 (CEST)
- Vehicle registration: DWR

Popowice [pɔpɔˈvit͡sɛ] is a village in the administrative district of Gmina Jordanów Śląski, within Wrocław County, Lower Silesian Voivodeship, in south-western Poland.

== History ==
The territory became a part of the emerging Polish state under its first historic ruler Mieszko I in the 10th century. Until 1288, Popowice belonged to the castle chapel in Niemcza. In 1288, during the endowment of the newly established Church of the Holy Cross in Wrocław by Polish ruler Henryk IV Probus, the village was granted to the church by the bishop of Wrocław Tomasz Zaremba, subsequently remaining a private church village. In 1842, it had a population of 42.

== Notable people ==
- Erich Fellgiebel (1886–1944), German general
