= Gmina Jordanów Śląski =

Gmina Jordanów Śląski Jordanów Śląski Commune
- Gmina
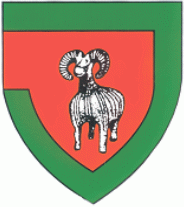
- Coat of arms
- Interactive map of Gmina Jordanów Śląski
- Coordinates (Jordanów Śląski): 50°51′43″N 16°51′57″E
- Country: Poland
- Voivodeship: Lower Silesian
- County: Wrocław
- Seat: Jordanów Śląski
- Sołectwos: Biskupice, Dankowice, Glinica, Janówek, Jezierzyce Wielkie, Jordanów Śląski, Mleczna, Piotrówek, Popowice, Pożarzyce, Tomice, Wilczkowice, Winna Góra

Area
  - Total: 56.62 km^{2} (21.86 sq mi)

Population (2019-06-30)
  - Total: 3,157
  - Density: 55.76/km^{2} (144.4/sq mi)
- Website: http://www.jordanowslaski.pl

Gmina Jordanów Śląski is a rural gmina (administrative district) in Wrocław County, Lower Silesian Voivodeship, in south-western Poland. Its seat is the village of Jordanów Śląski, which lies approximately 32 kilometres (20 mi) south of the regional capital Wrocław. It is part of the Wrocław metropolitan area.

The gmina covers an area of 56.62 square kilometres (21.9 sq mi), and as of 2019 its total population was 3,157.

== Neighbouring gminas ==
Gmina Jordanów Śląski is bordered by the gminas of Borów, Kobierzyce, Kondratowice, Łagiewniki and Sobótka.

== Villages ==
The gmina contains the villages of Biskupice, Dankowice, Glinica, Janówek, Jezierzyce Wielkie, Jordanów Śląski, Mleczna, Piotrówek, Popowice, Pożarzyce, Tomice, Wilczkowice and Winna Góra.
