= Bismarck Tower, Janówek =

Bismarck Tower
- Wieża Bismarcka
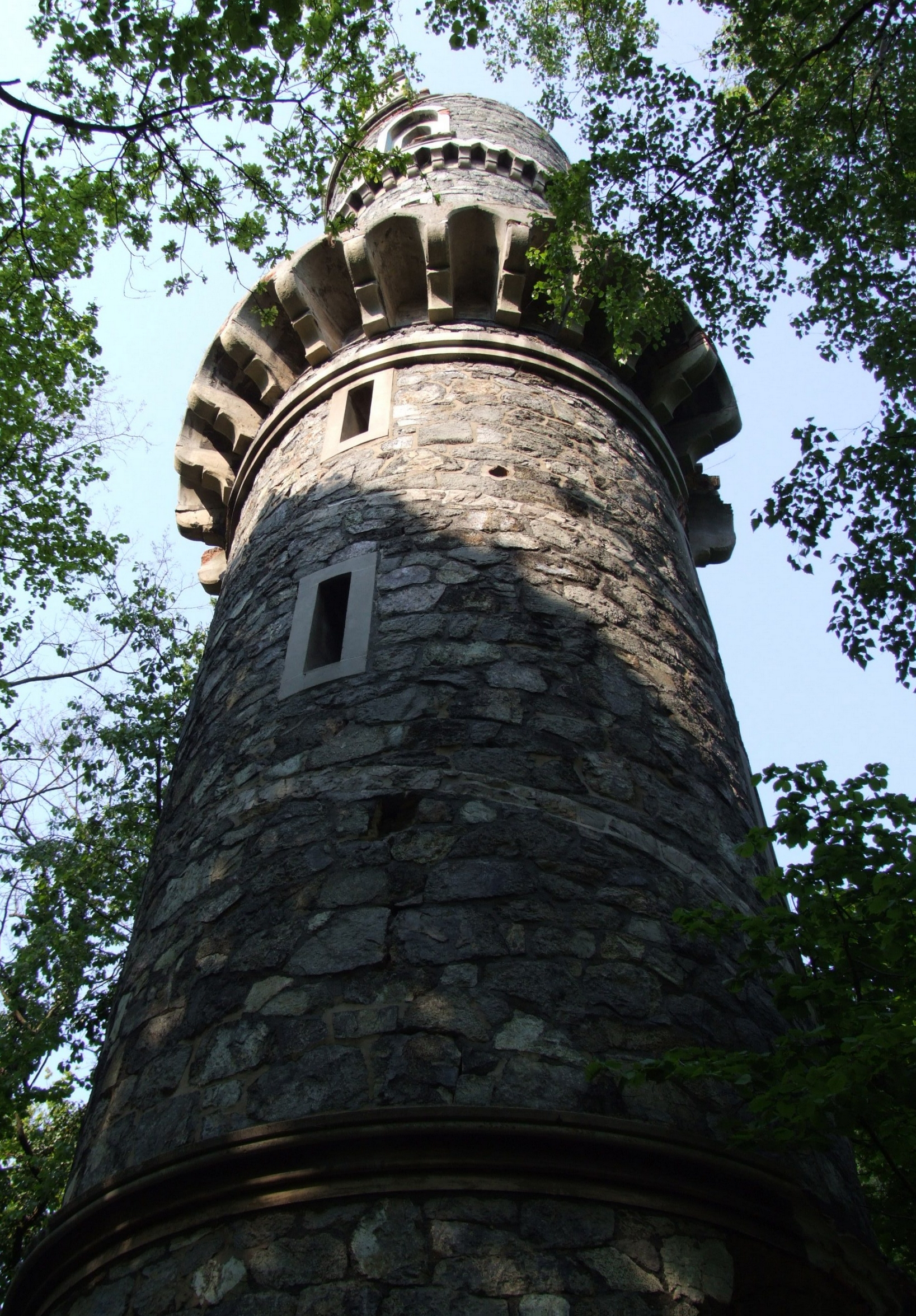

- Location within Poland

General information
- Location: Janówek, Poland
- Coordinates: 50°49′59″N 16°50′03″E
- Construction started: 1869

The Bismarck Tower in Janówek, Poland, is a historical observation tower and cultural heritage site on top of the Jańska Góra hill, 253 m above sea level. It was erected in 1869 as the world's first Bismarck tower. The tower itself is 23 m in height.

== History ==
The idea of erecting a monument to Otto von Bismarck had been mooted as far back as 1863 by retired Prussian officer Friedrich Schröter (1820–1888), a wealthy landowner in nearby Wättrisch (Sokolniki) and an admirer of the Iron Chancellor (Eiserner Kanzler). Following the Prussian victories in the Second Schleswig War (1864) and the Seven Weeks War (1866), Schröter then set about realising his plans. A site was picked for construction of the tower: the south face of Johnsberg Hill near the neighbouring village of Ober-Johnsdorf, part of which was owned by Schröter (1,100 acres).

Construction began on 15 April 1869, carried out by master mason Bernhardt from Nimptsch (Niemcza) under the supervision of a foreman named Rademacher. Serpentine from a local quarry was used as construction material, as well as granite, sandstone and brickwork. The total cost of construction was 18,000 marks.

The tower was inaugurated on 18 October 1869. Over the entrance were inscribed in golden letters the words "IN HONOUR OF BISMARCK - 1869". The ground floor housed two marble slabs, one commemorating the wars of 1864 and 1866, the other the unification of Germany in 1870.

The following year the tower and its surrounding park was opened to the public. The keys to the tower could be rented from the owner in Wättrisch. It was used as an observation deck and recreational centre; in 1910 there was even a wooden pavilion.

== Contemporary situation ==
During World War II, the lower part of the tower sustained damage from an artillery shell. Following Germany's surrender, the village was transferred to Poland in accordance with the Potsdam Agreement and renamed Janówek.

The tower was largely neglected from 1945 onwards. In May 1992, the marble slabs were removed and all references to Bismarck, who had particularly strong anti-Polish sentiment and even called for the extermination of Poles, were erased. By August 2002 the tower was in ruins, although it was still possible to ascend the stairs to the central chamber.

The structure is currently in severe need of restoration, and is mostly obscured by the surrounding trees. It was listed as a protected building by the Polish authorities in June 2003.
