= Janówek, Wrocław County =

Janówek
- Village
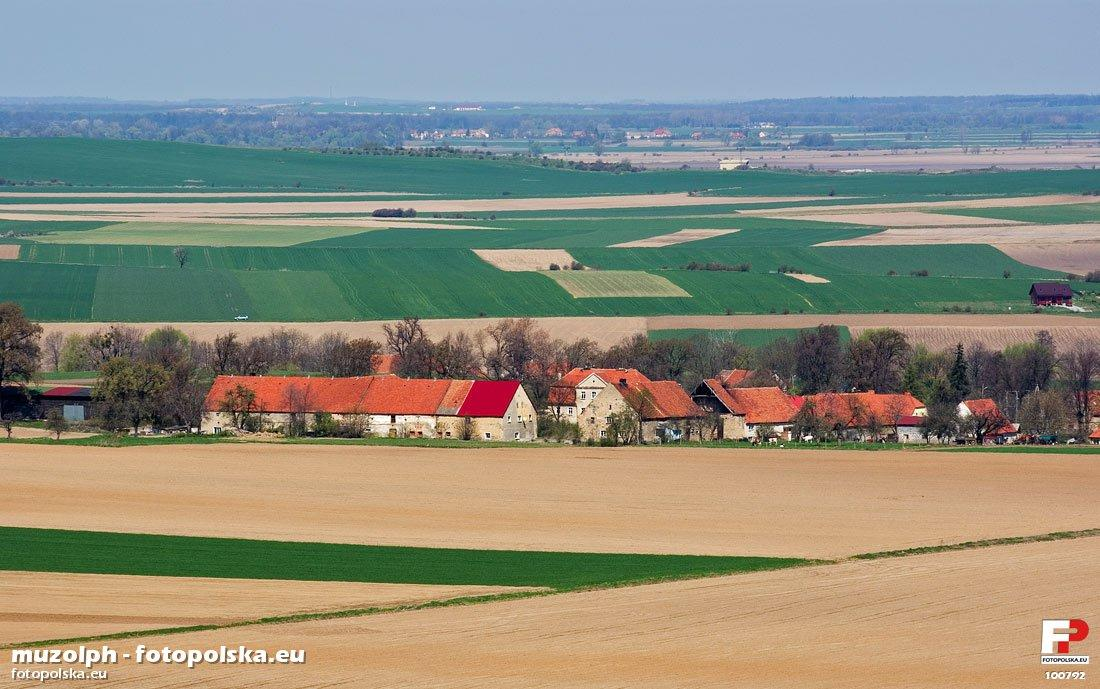

- Location within Poland
- Coordinates: 50°51′06″N 16°50′01″E
- Country: Poland
- Voivodeship: Lower Silesian
- County: Wrocław
- Gmina: Jordanów Śląski
- Time zone: UTC+1 (CET)
  - Summer (DST): UTC+2 (CEST)
- Vehicle registration: DWR

Janówek [jaˈnuvɛk] is a village in the administrative district of Gmina Jordanów Śląski, within Wrocław County, Lower Silesian Voivodeship, in south-western Poland.

The world's first Bismarck Tower can be found in Janówek. It was built in 1869 when the area was a part of Prussia.
