= Mleczna, Lower Silesian Voivodeship =

Mleczna
- Village
- Location within Poland
- Coordinates: 50°50′07″N 16°51′55″E
- Country: Poland
- Voivodeship: Lower Silesian
- County: Wrocław
- Gmina: Jordanów Śląski
- Elevation: 128 m (420 ft)
- Population: 142 (2,008)
- Time zone: UTC+1 (CET)
  - Summer (DST): UTC+2 (CEST)
- Vehicle registration: DWR

Mleczna [ˈmlɛt͡ʂna] is a village in the administrative district of Gmina Jordanów Śląski, within Wrocław County, Lower Silesian Voivodeship, in south-western Poland.
