= Palais Niederösterreich =

Building in Vienna, Austria

Coordinates: 48°12′36″N 16°21′53″E

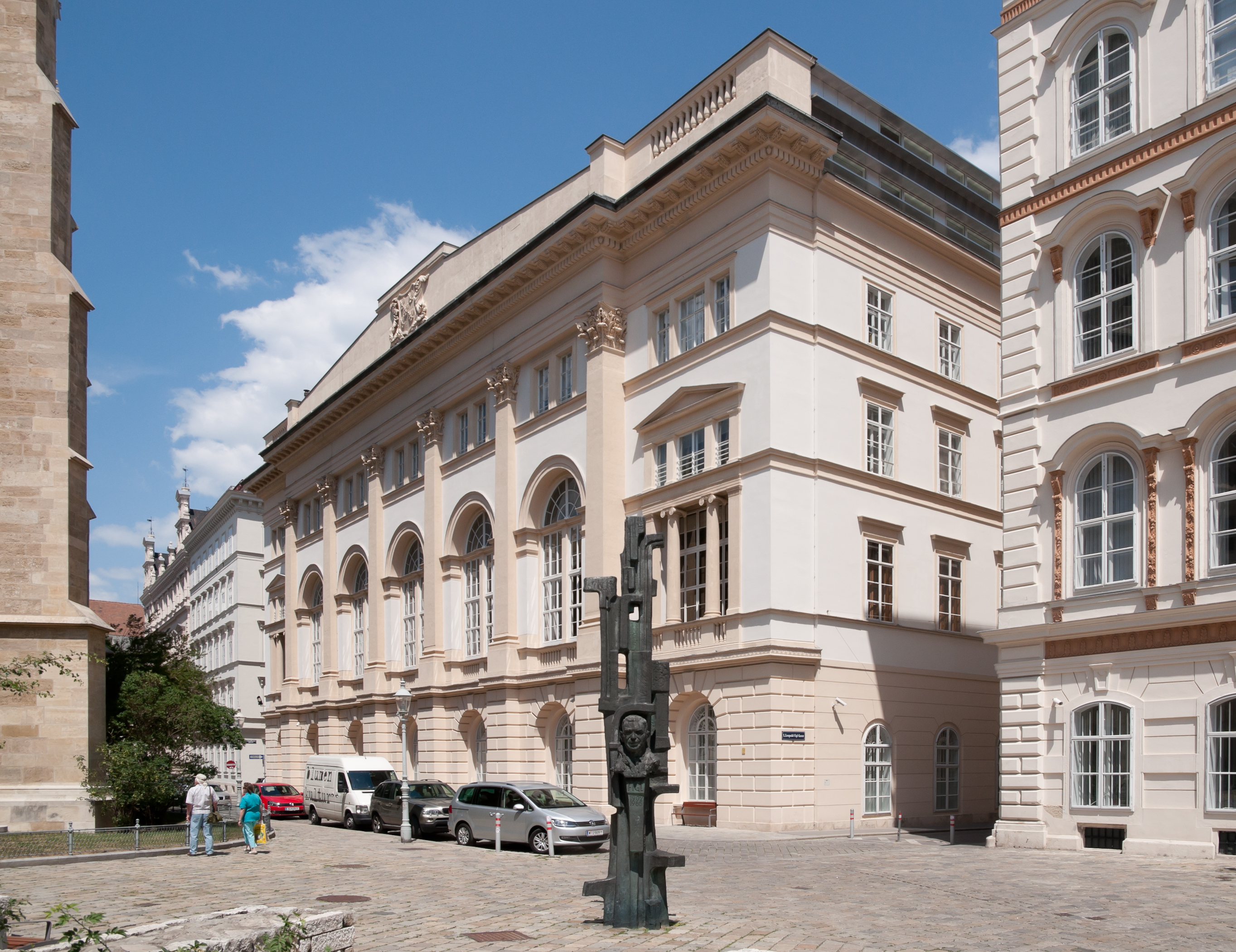
Palais Niederösterreich

Palais Niederösterreich, historically known as the Niederösterreichisches Landeshaus (Estates House of Lower Austria), is a historical building in Vienna. The building housed the estates general of the state of Lower Austria until 1848. After 1861, the state assembly and some state government ministries occupied it until 1997, when St. Pölten fully took on the role of the new capital of Lower Austria.

As part of the unrest associated with the Revolutions of 1848, demonstrators stormed the Niederösterreichisches Landeshaus on March 13th. The uprising was subsequently crushed by the military.

In 1918, the provisional assembly of German Austria briefly met here, prior to its movement to the Austrian Parliament Building.

After the legislature and the ministries moved out of the building in 1997, the building underwent substantial renovations and restoration work. It is now used for exhibitions and for private functions and events. It was renamed the Palais Niederösterreich in 2004.
