= Palais Wilczek =

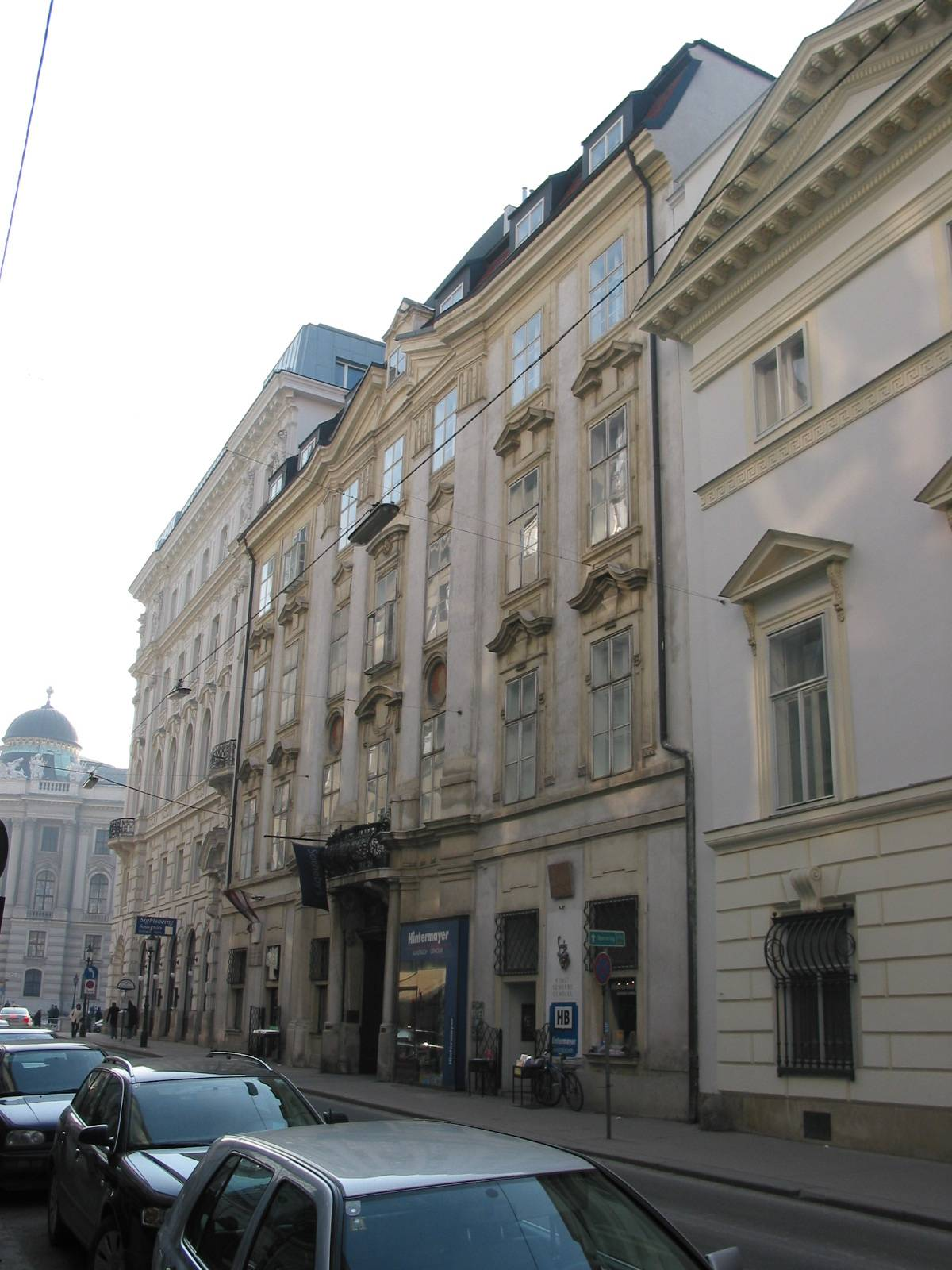
- Palais Wilczek in Vienna.
- Interactive map of the Palais Wilczek area

General information
- Status: Completed
- Location: Vienna, Austria
- Coordinates: 48.20863°N 16.36617°E
- Owner: Wilczek family

Palais Wilczek is a palace in Vienna, Austria. It was owned by the noble Wilczek family. The palace, as it stands now, was built on the site of the former Brassican family palace some time between 1722 and 1737. The construction is attributed to Anton Johann Ospel. In 1728 the palace came into the possession of Lower Austrian Landmarschall Carl Ignaz Lempruch. The Wilczek family came into possession of the palace in 1825.

The palace is located between Palais Herberstein and Palais Modena. Franz Grillparzer and Joseph Freiherr von Eichendorff have both lived there.
