= Pełcznica =

Pełcznica may refer to:

- Pełcznica, Lower Silesian Voivodeship, a village in south-western Poland
- Pełcznica (river)
