= Strzegomka =

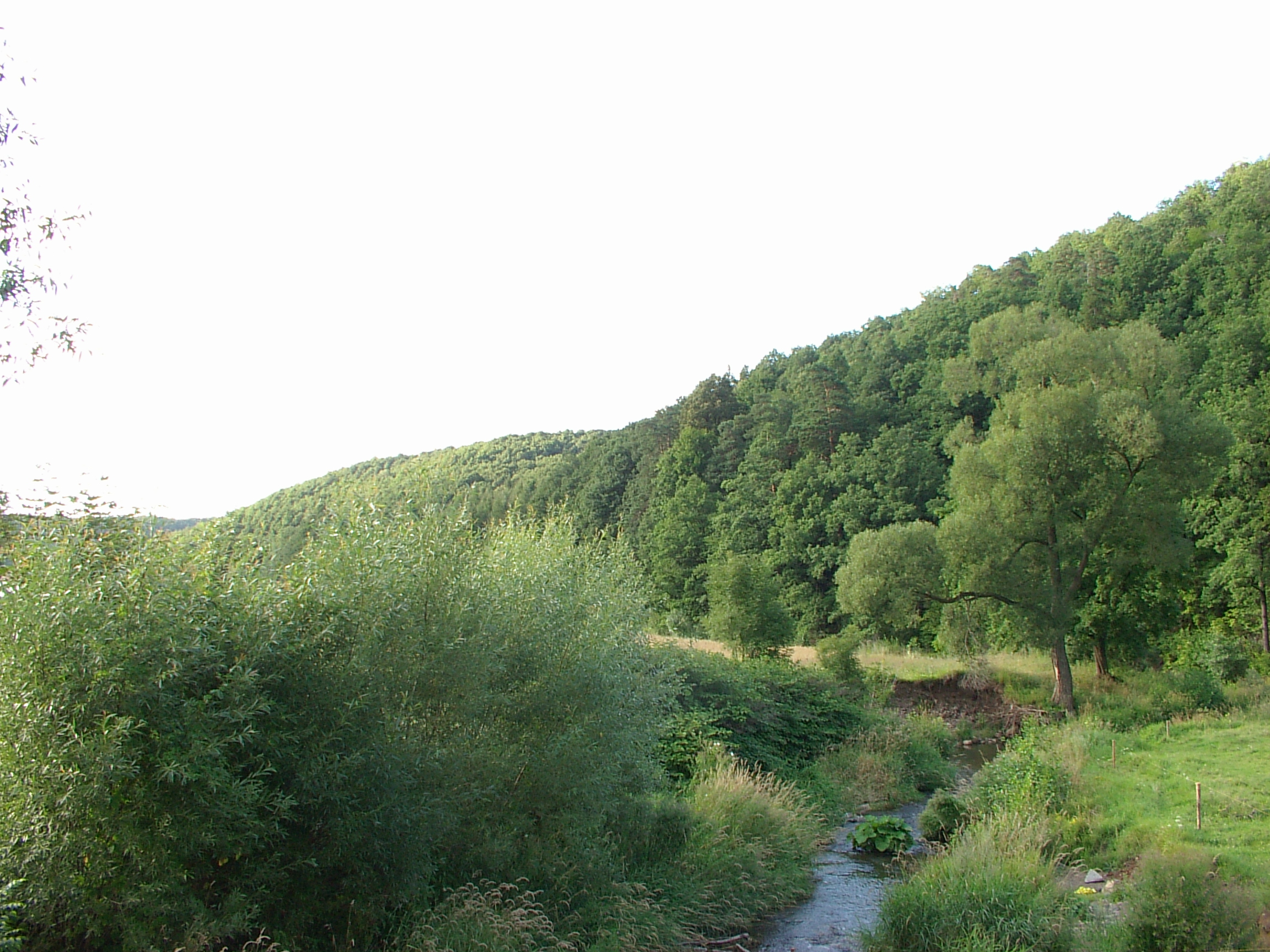
- The Strzegomka in Chwaliszów

Location
- Country: Poland
- Voivodeship: Lower Silesian

Physical characteristics
- Source
  - location: A slope of the Trójgarb and Krąglak Massif, in Wałbrzych County
  - coordinates: 50°48′53.2″N 16°09′52.2″E
  - elevation: 636 m (2,087 ft)
- Mouth: Bystrzyca
  - location: northwest of Samotwór, Wrocław County
  - coordinates: 51°06′23″N 16°49′47″E
  - elevation: 121.1 m (397 ft)
- Length: 74.70 km (46.42 mi)
- Basin size: 555 km^{2} (214 mi^{2})
- Discharge
  - average: 3 m^{3}/s (110 cu ft/s) at the mouth

Basin features
- Progression: Bystrzyca→ Oder→ Baltic Sea
- Tributaries
  - right: Pełcznica

The Strzegomka is a river of Poland, a tributary of the Bystrzyca in Samotwór. Before 1945, the river was known as the Striegau.
