= Jurczyce =

Jurczyce may refer to the following places in Poland:

- Jurczyce, Lesser Poland Voivodeship (south Poland)
- Jurczyce, Wrocław County in Lower Silesian Voivodeship (south-west Poland)
