= Gorzyce =

Gorzyce may refer to the following places in Poland:

- Gorzyce, Kościan County in Greater Poland Voivodeship (west-central Poland)
- Gorzyce, Września County in Greater Poland Voivodeship (west-central Poland)
- Gorzyce, Kuyavian-Pomeranian Voivodeship (north-central Poland)
- Gorzyce, Lesser Poland Voivodeship (south Poland)
- Gorzyce, Silesian Voivodeship (south Poland)
- Gorzyce, Przeworsk County in Subcarpathian Voivodeship (south-east Poland)
- Gorzyce, Tarnobrzeg County in Subcarpathian Voivodeship (south-east Poland)
- Gorzyce, Jasło County in Subcarpathian Voivodeship (south-east Poland)
- Górzyce, Lower Silesian Voivodeship (south-west Poland)
