= Kamionna =

Kamionna may refer to the following places in Poland:

- Kamionna, Lower Silesian Voivodeship (south-west Poland)
- Kamionna, Lesser Poland Voivodeship (south Poland)
- Kamionna, Pułtusk County in Masovian Voivodeship (east-central Poland)
- Kamionna, Węgrów County in Masovian Voivodeship (east-central Poland)
- Kamionna, Greater Poland Voivodeship (west-central Poland)
