= Stradów =

Stradów may refer to the following places in Poland:

- Stradów, Lower Silesian Voivodeship (south-west Poland)
- Stradów, Świętokrzyskie Voivodeship (south-central Poland)
