= Nowa Wieś Wrocławska =

- Village
- Location within Poland
- Coordinates: 51°2′45″N 16°55′1″E
- Country: Poland
- Voivodeship: Lower Silesian
- County: Wrocław
- Gmina: Kąty Wrocławskie
- Time zone: UTC+1 (CET)
  - Summer (DST): UTC+2 (CEST)
- Vehicle registration: DWR

Nowa Wieś Wrocławska (Polish: [ˈnɔva ˈvjɛʑ vrɔˈt͡swafska]) is a village in the administrative district of Gmina Kąty Wrocławskie, within Wrocław County, Lower Silesian Voivodeship, in south-western Poland.

Since the Middle Ages the region was part of Poland, Bohemia, Hungary, Prussia, Germany, and following Nazi Germany's defeat in World War II in 1945, it became again part of Poland.
