= Strzeganowice =

- Village
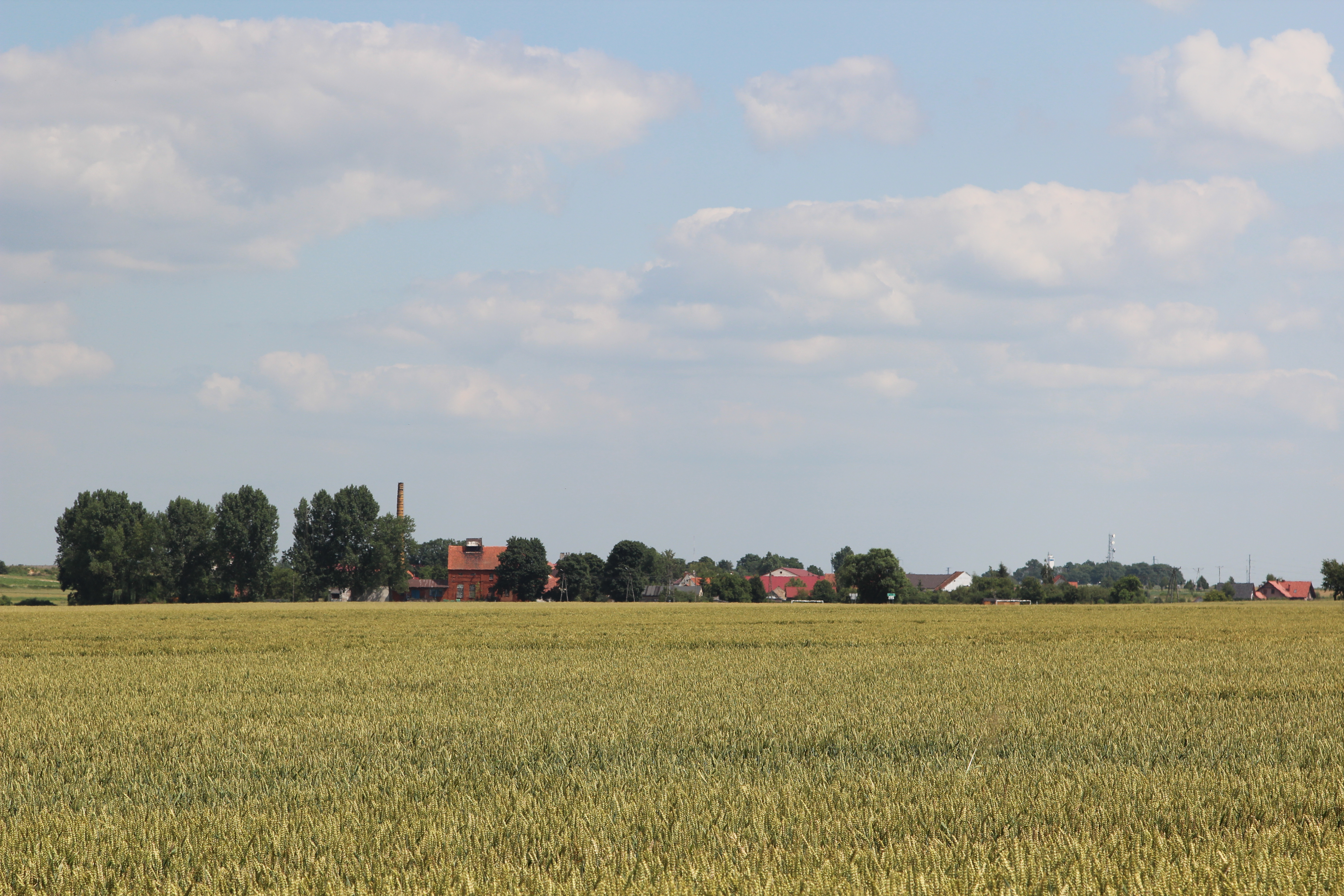
- General view of Strzeganowice

- Location within Poland
- Coordinates: 51°01′39″N 16°50′53″E
- Country: Poland
- Voivodeship: Lower Silesian
- County: Wrocław
- Gmina: Kąty Wrocławskie
- Population: 240
- Time zone: UTC+1 (CET)
  - Summer (DST): UTC+2 (CEST)

Strzeganowice [stʂɛɡanɔˈvit͡sɛ] is a village in the administrative district of Gmina Kąty Wrocławskie, within Wrocław County, Lower Silesian Voivodeship, in south-western Poland.

== History ==
Strzeganowice dates back to the Middle Ages. The oldest known mention of the village comes from a document from 1155.

In January 1945, in the village, the Germans carried out a mass execution of a group of prisoners during the "death march" from the subcamp in Miłoszyce to the Gross-Rosen concentration camp. Some were buried alive. Two mass graves were discovered in 1974 and 1978.
