= Kębłowice, Lower Silesian Voivodeship =

Kębłowice
- Village
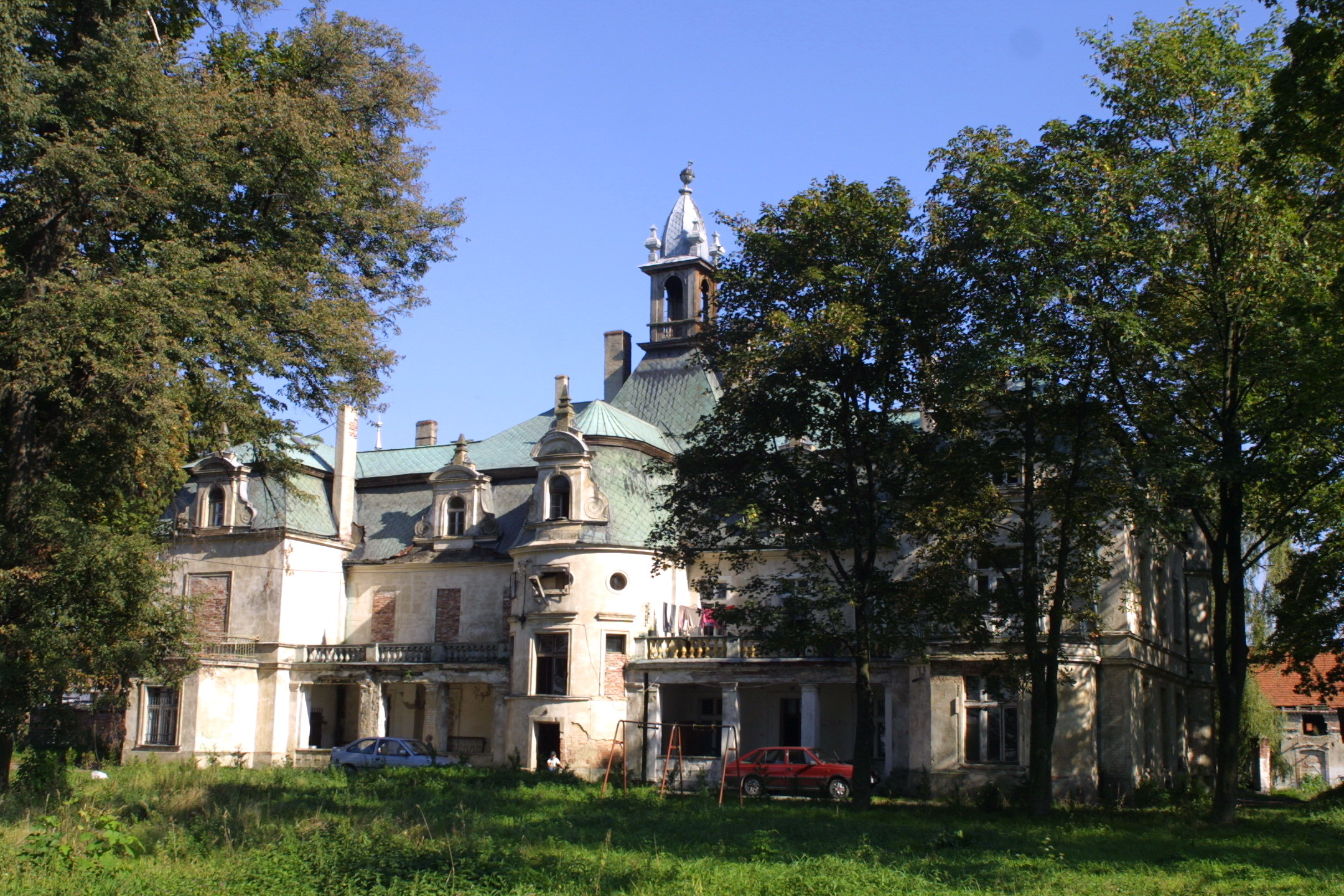
- Kębłowice Palace

- Location within Poland
- Coordinates: 51°05′14″N 16°51′01″E
- Country: Poland
- Voivodeship: Lower Silesian
- County: Wrocław
- Gmina: Kąty Wrocławskie

Kębłowice [kɛmbwɔˈvit͡sɛ] is a village in the administrative district of Gmina Kąty Wrocławskie, within Wrocław County, Lower Silesian Voivodeship, in south-western Poland.
