= Baranowice, Wrocław County =

Baranowice
- Village
- Location within Poland
- Coordinates: 51°02′42″N 16°52′07″E
- Country: Poland
- Voivodeship: Lower Silesian
- County: Wrocław
- Gmina: Kąty Wrocławskie

Baranowice [baranɔˈvit͡sɛ] is a village in the administrative district of Gmina Kąty Wrocławskie, within Wrocław County, Lower Silesian Voivodeship, in south-western Poland.
