= Wojtkowice =

- Village
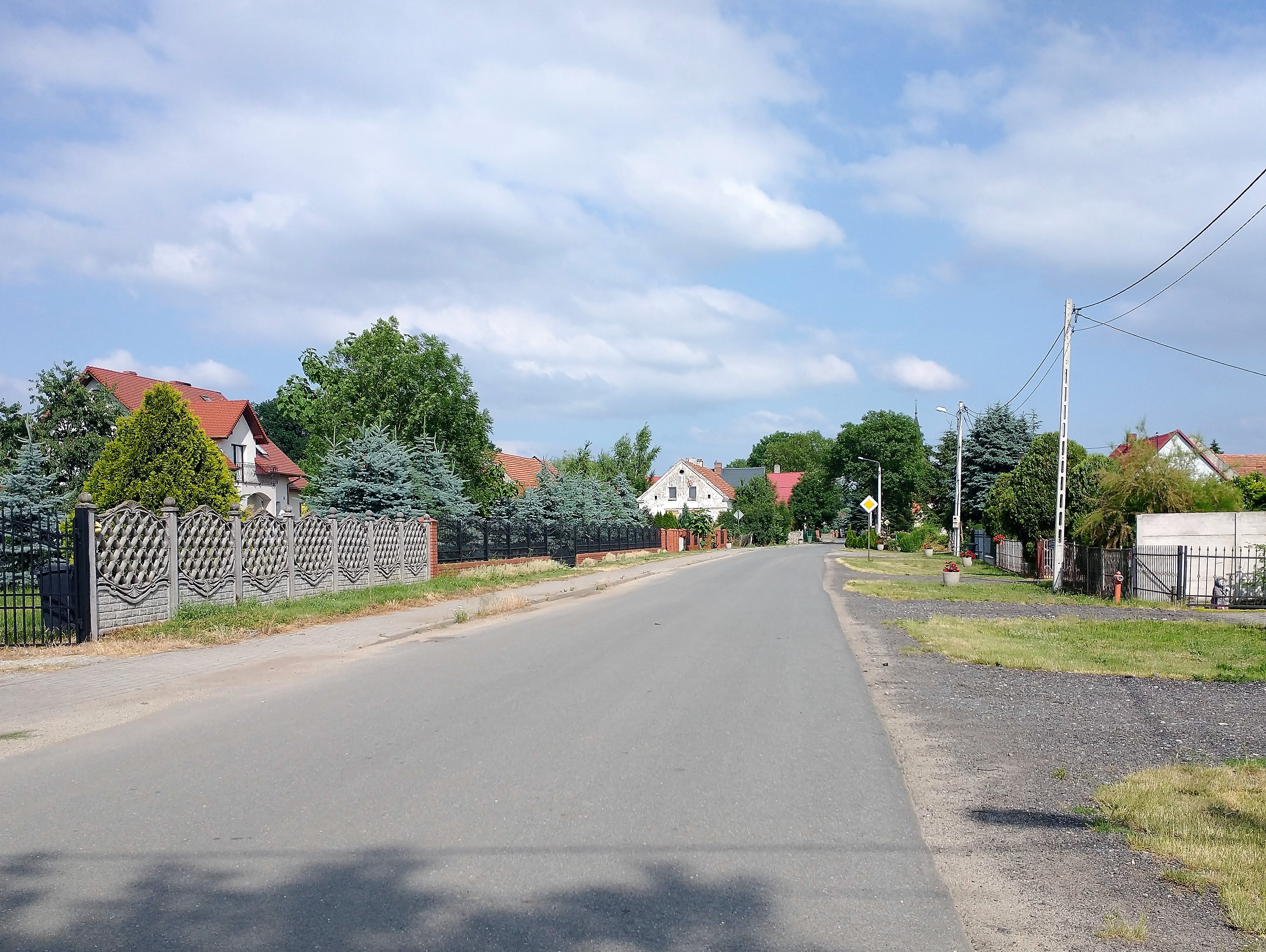

- Location within Poland
- Coordinates: 51°1′N 16°49′E
- Country: Poland
- Voivodeship: Lower Silesian
- County: Wrocław
- Gmina: Kąty Wrocławskie

Wojtkowice [vɔi̯tkɔˈvit͡sɛ] is a village in the administrative district of Gmina Kąty Wrocławskie, within Wrocław County, Lower Silesian Voivodeship, in south-western Poland.
