= Gniechowice =

- Village
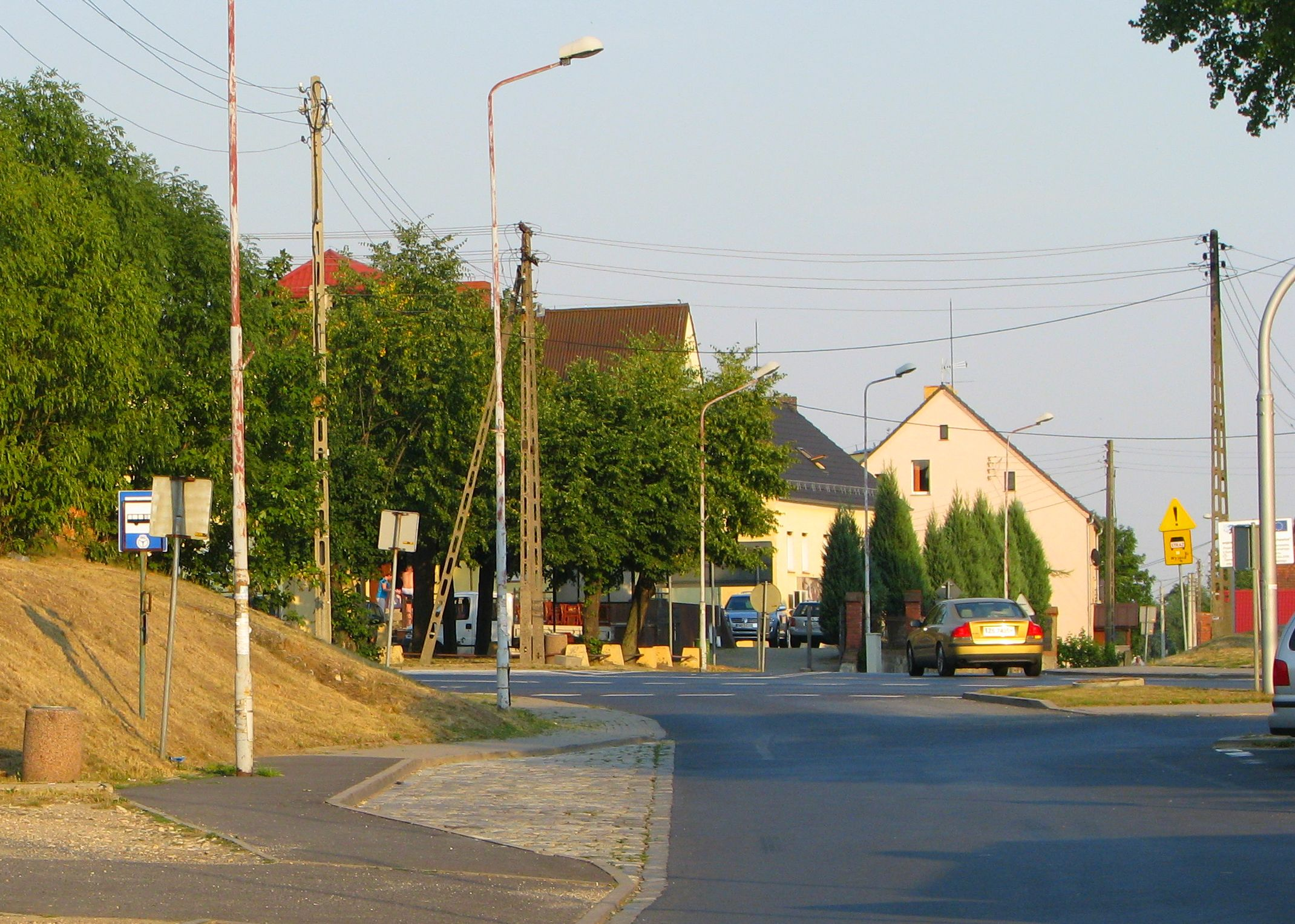

- Location within Poland
- Coordinates: 50°59′20″N 16°49′52″E
- Country: Poland
- Voivodeship: Lower Silesian
- County: Wrocław
- Gmina: Kąty Wrocławskie
- Highest elevation: 145 m (476 ft)
- Lowest elevation: 130 m (430 ft)
- Population (approx.): 1,400

Gniechowice [ɡɲɛxɔˈvit͡sɛ] is a village in the administrative district of Gmina Kąty Wrocławskie, within Wrocław County, Lower Silesian Voivodeship, in south-western Poland.
