= Romnów =

- Village
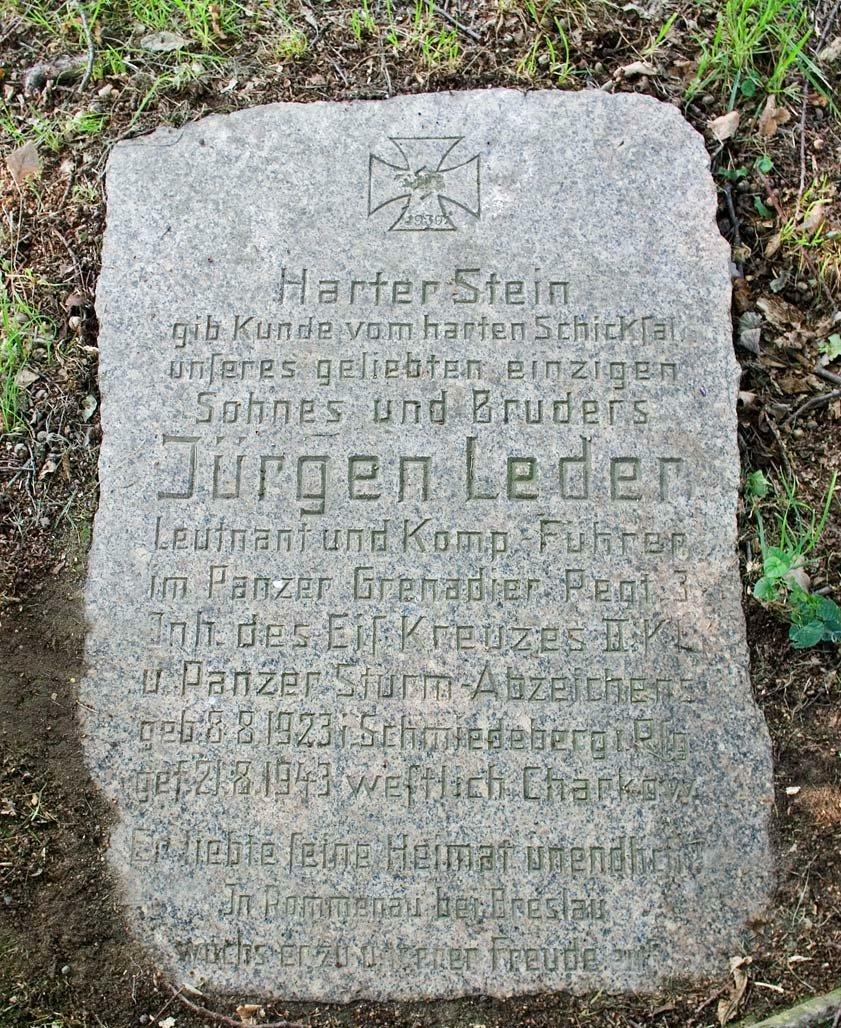

- Location within Poland
- Coordinates: 51°04′46″N 16°48′13″E
- Country: Poland
- Voivodeship: Lower Silesian
- County: Wrocław
- Gmina: Kąty Wrocławskie
- Population: 78

Romnów [ˈrɔmnuf] is a village in the administrative district of Gmina Kąty Wrocławskie, within Wrocław County, Lower Silesian Voivodeship, in south-western Poland.
