= Stoszyce =

- Village
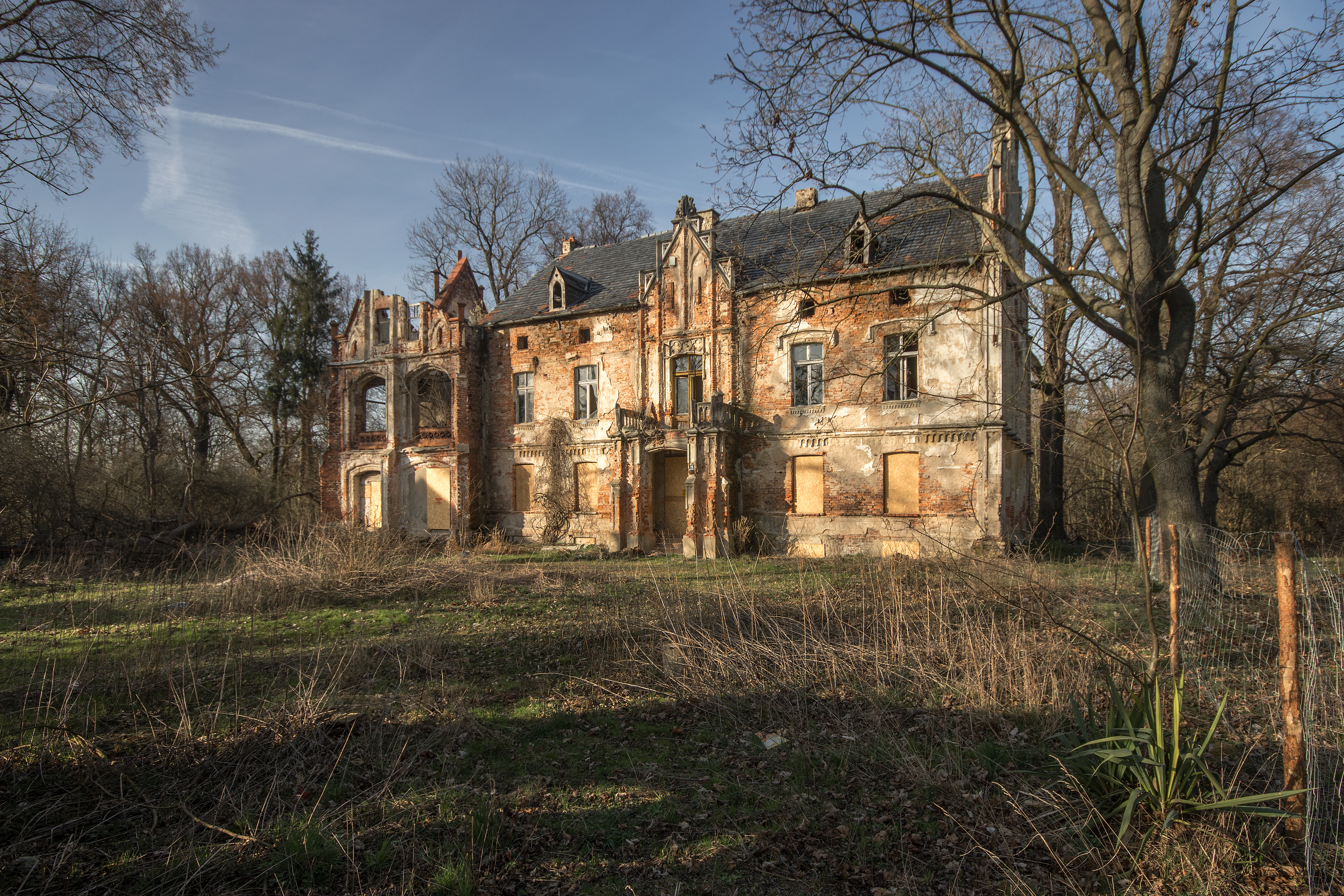

- Location within Poland
- Coordinates: 51°04′30″N 16°46′45″E
- Country: Poland
- Voivodeship: Lower Silesian
- County: Wrocław
- Gmina: Kąty Wrocławskie

Stoszyce [stɔˈʂɨt͡sɛ] is a village in the administrative district of Gmina Kąty Wrocławskie, within Wrocław County, Lower Silesian Voivodeship, in south-western Poland.

Stoszyce has a warm temperate climate with heavy rainfall year-round.
