= Zachowice =

- Village
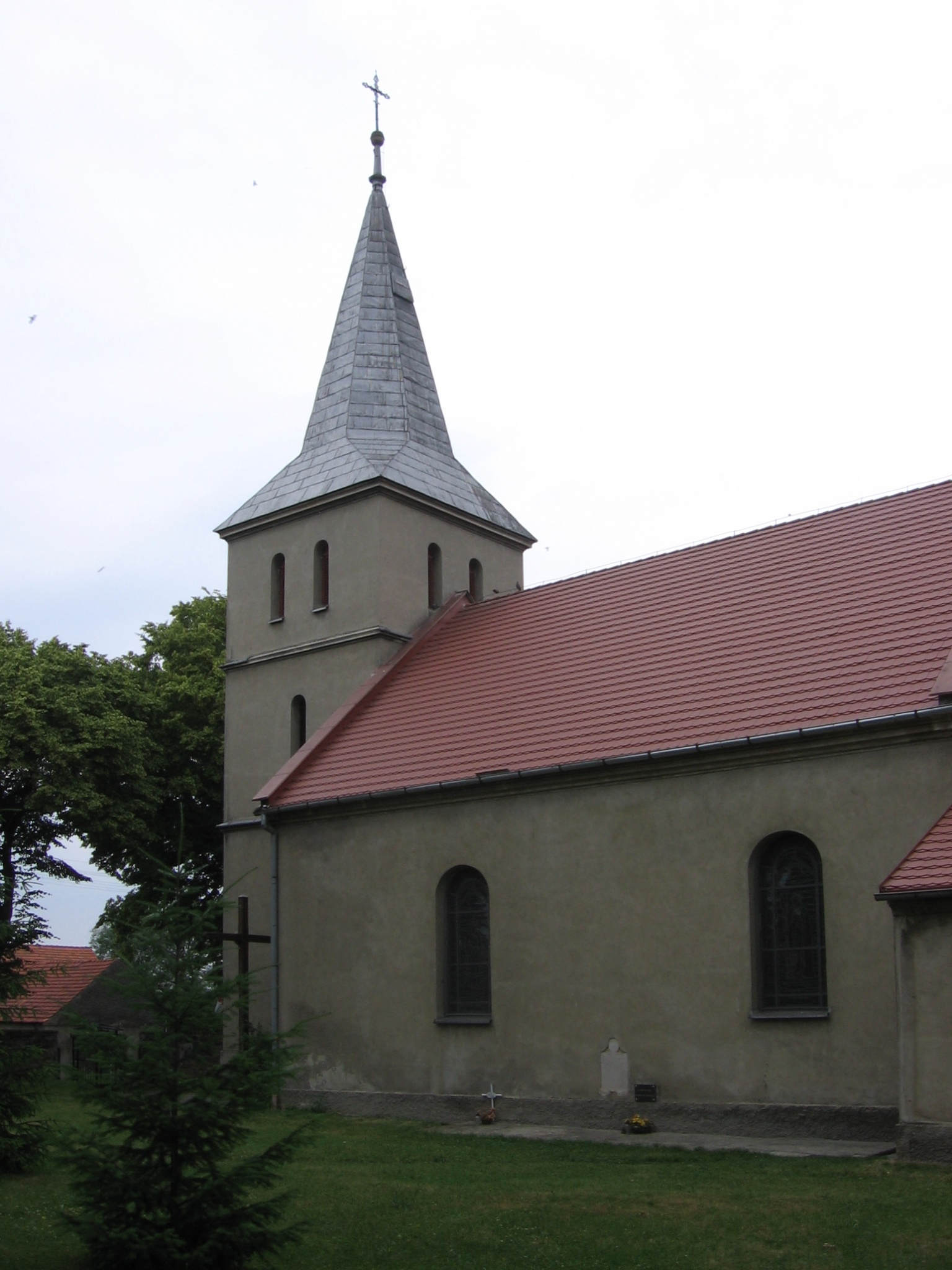
- Catholic church

- Location within Poland
- Coordinates: 50°59′N 16°47′E
- Country: Poland
- Voivodeship: Lower Silesian
- County: Wrocław
- Gmina: Kąty Wrocławskie

Zachowice [zaxɔˈvit͡sɛ] is a village in the administrative district of Gmina Kąty Wrocławskie, within Wrocław County, Lower Silesian Voivodeship, in south-western Poland.
