= Pietrzykowice, Gmina Kąty Wrocławskie =

Pietrzykowice
- Village
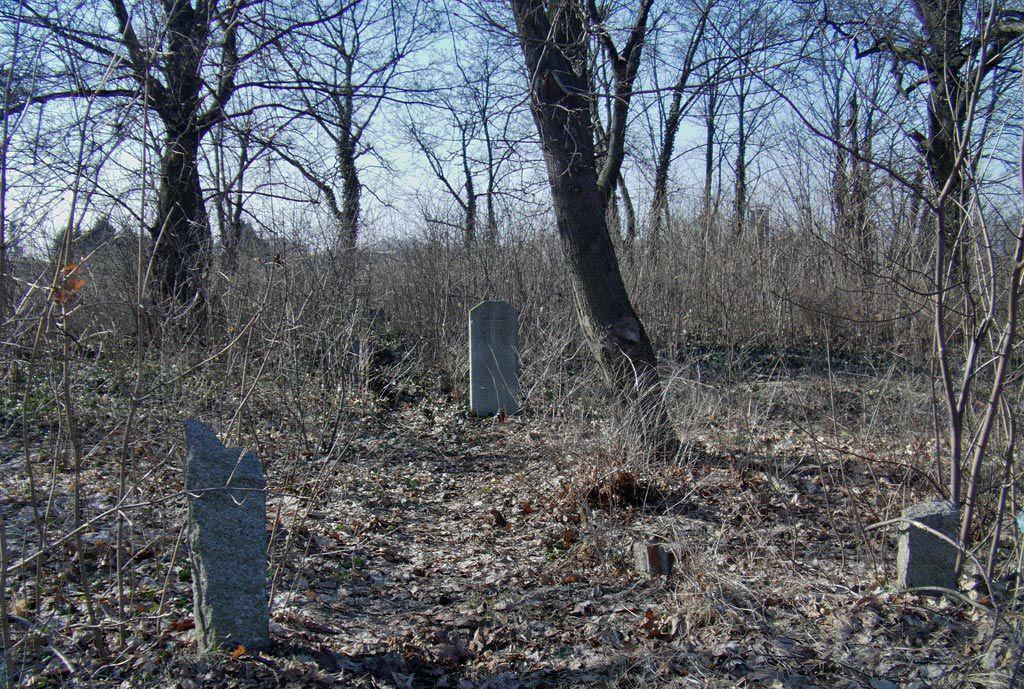
- Protestant cemetery

- Location within Poland
- Coordinates: 51°03′25.5″N 16°52′51.5″E
- Country: Poland
- Voivodeship: Lower Silesian
- County: Wrocław
- Gmina: Kąty Wrocławskie

Population
  - Total: 512
- Time zone: UTC+1 (CET)
  - Summer (DST): UTC+2 (CEST)
- Vehicle registration: DWR

Pietrzykowice [pjɛtʂɨkɔˈvit͡sɛ] is a village in the administrative district of Gmina Kąty Wrocławskie, within Wrocław County, Lower Silesian Voivodeship, in south-western Poland. Pietrzykowice is located approximately 15 km (9 mi) south west of Wrocław.

== History ==
In the 10th century the area became part of the emerging Polish state, and later on, it was part of Poland, Bohemia, Prussia. As the result of Ostsiedlung, the place name became Polnisch Peterwitz. Under Nazi rule, the name was changed to Petersweiler to erase traces of Polish origin. During World War II, the German administration operated the E303 forced labour subcamp of the Stalag VIII-B/344 prisoner-of-war camp for Allied POWs at the local sugar factory. After the defeat of Germany in the war, in 1945, the village became again part of Poland and its population fled or was expelled.

A sugar factory was once located in Pietrzykowice. However this factory has since been demolished. The factory processed sugar beet which was grown on farms in area around Pietrzykowice.

== Transport ==
The Voivodeship road 347 passes through the village, and the A4 motorway runs nearby, south of the village.
