= Sadków, Wrocław County =

Sadków
- Village
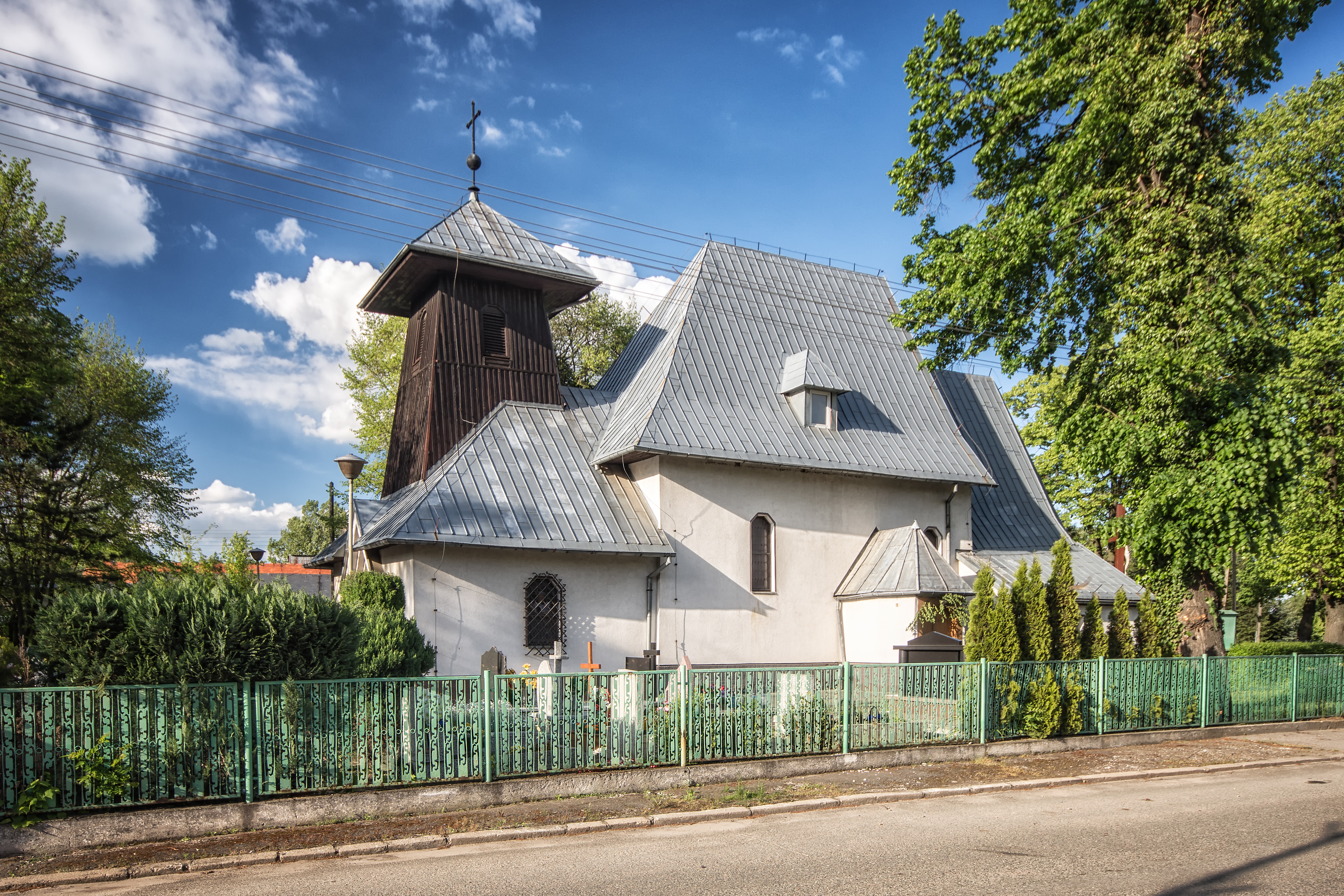
- SM Sadków Kościół św Jadwigi

- Location within Poland
- Coordinates: 51°3′3″N 16°49′50″E
- Country: Poland
- Voivodeship: Lower Silesian
- County: Wrocław
- Gmina: Kąty Wrocławskie
- Population: 630

Sadków [ˈsatkuf] is a village in the administrative district of Gmina Kąty Wrocławskie, within Wrocław County, Lower Silesian Voivodeship, in south-western Poland.
