= Szymanów, Wrocław County =

Szymanów
- Village
- Location within Poland
- Coordinates: 50°59′55″N 16°43′12″E
- Country: Poland
- Voivodeship: Lower Silesian
- County: Wrocław
- Gmina: Kąty Wrocławskie

Szymanów (Polish pronunciation: [ʂɨˈmanuf]) is a village in the administrative district of Gmina Kąty Wrocławskie, within Wrocław County, Lower Silesian Voivodeship, in south-western Poland.
