= Nowa Wieś Kącka =

- Village
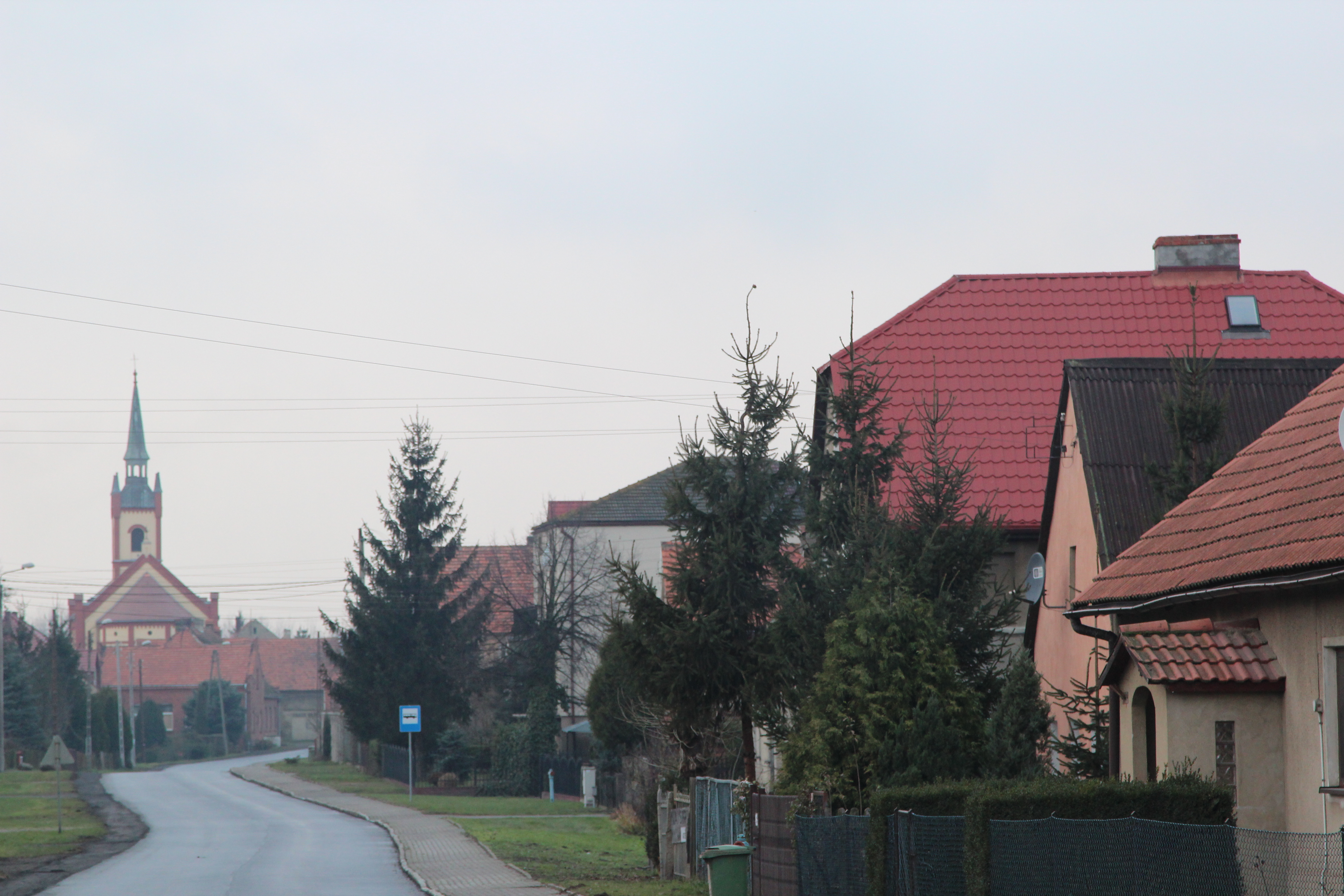

- Location within Poland
- Coordinates: 51°01′26″N 16°43′55″E
- Country: Poland
- Voivodeship: Lower Silesian
- County: Wrocław
- Gmina: Kąty Wrocławskie

Population
  - Total: 280
- Time zone: UTC+1 (CET)
  - Summer (DST): UTC+2 (CEST)
- Vehicle registration: DWR
- Website: http://www.nowawieskacka.pl

Nowa Wieś Kącka [ˈnɔva ˈvjɛɕ ˈkɔnt͡ska] is a village in the administrative district of Gmina Kąty Wrocławskie, within Wrocław County, Lower Silesian Voivodeship, in south-western Poland.

== Monuments ==
- Medieval stone cross (probably conciliation cross)
- Neogothic wayside shrine from 1875
