= Krzeptów =

- Village
- Location within Poland
- Coordinates: 51°05′27″N 16°53′03″E
- Country: Poland
- Voivodeship: Lower Silesian
- County: Wrocław
- Gmina: Kąty Wrocławskie

Krzeptów [ˈkʂɛptuf] is a village in the administrative district of Gmina Kąty Wrocławskie, within Wrocław County, Lower Silesian Voivodeship, in south-western Poland.
