= Kozłów, Wrocław County =

Kozłów
- Village
- Location within Poland
- Coordinates: 51°2′13″N 16°43′39″E
- Country: Poland
- Voivodeship: Lower Silesian
- County: Wrocław
- Gmina: Kąty Wrocławskie

Kozłów [ˈkɔzwuf] is a village in the administrative district of Gmina Kąty Wrocławskie, within Wrocław County, Lower Silesian Voivodeship, in south-western Poland.
