= Książ Landscape Park =

Protected area in Poland

Coordinates: 50.8569°N 16.2489°E

- Książański Park Krajobrazowy
- IUCN category V (protected landscape/seascape)
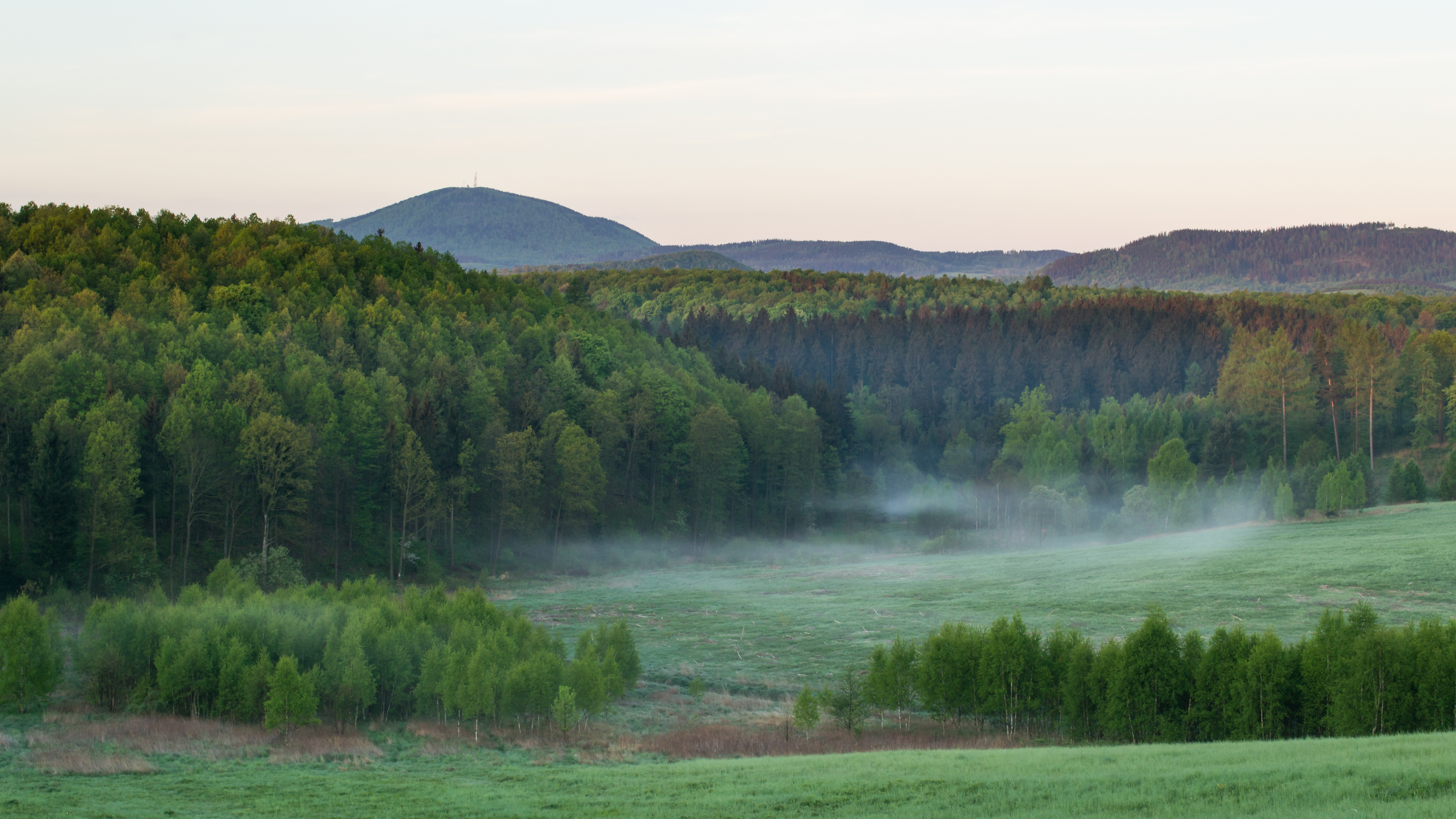
- Książ Landscape Park
- Interactive map of Książ Landscape Park
- Location: Lower Silesian Voivodeship
- Area: 31.55 km^{2} (12.18 sq mi)
- Established: 1981

Książ Landscape Park (Książański Park Krajobrazowy) is a protected area (Landscape Park) in south-western Poland, established in 1981, covering an area of 31.55 square kilometres (12.18 sq mi). It takes its name from the historic castle of Książ, which overlooks the Pełcznica River.

The Park lies within Lower Silesian Voivodeship: in Świdnica County (Gmina Dobromierz, Świebodzice, Gmina Świdnica) and Wałbrzych County (Gmina Stare Bogaczowice).

Within the Landscape Park are two nature reserves.
