= Stary Dwór, Wrocław County =

Stary Dwór
- Village
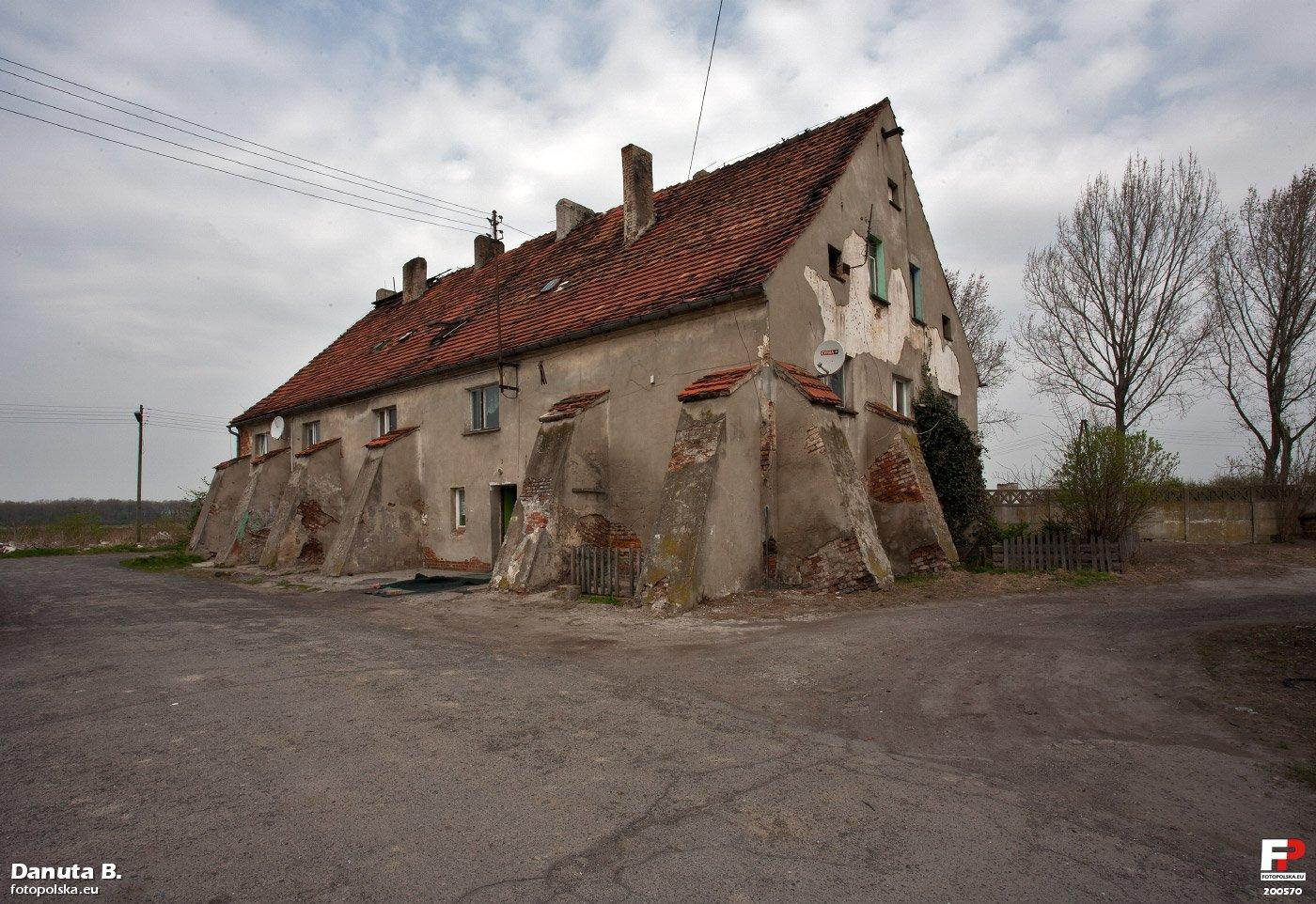

- Location within Poland
- Coordinates: 51°00′25″N 16°50′48″E
- Country: Poland
- Voivodeship: Lower Silesian
- County: Wrocław
- Gmina: Kąty Wrocławskie

Stary Dwór [ˈstarɨ ˈdvur] is a village in the administrative district of Gmina Kąty Wrocławskie, within Wrocław County, Lower Silesian Voivodeship, in south-western Poland.
