= Wszemiłowice =

- Village
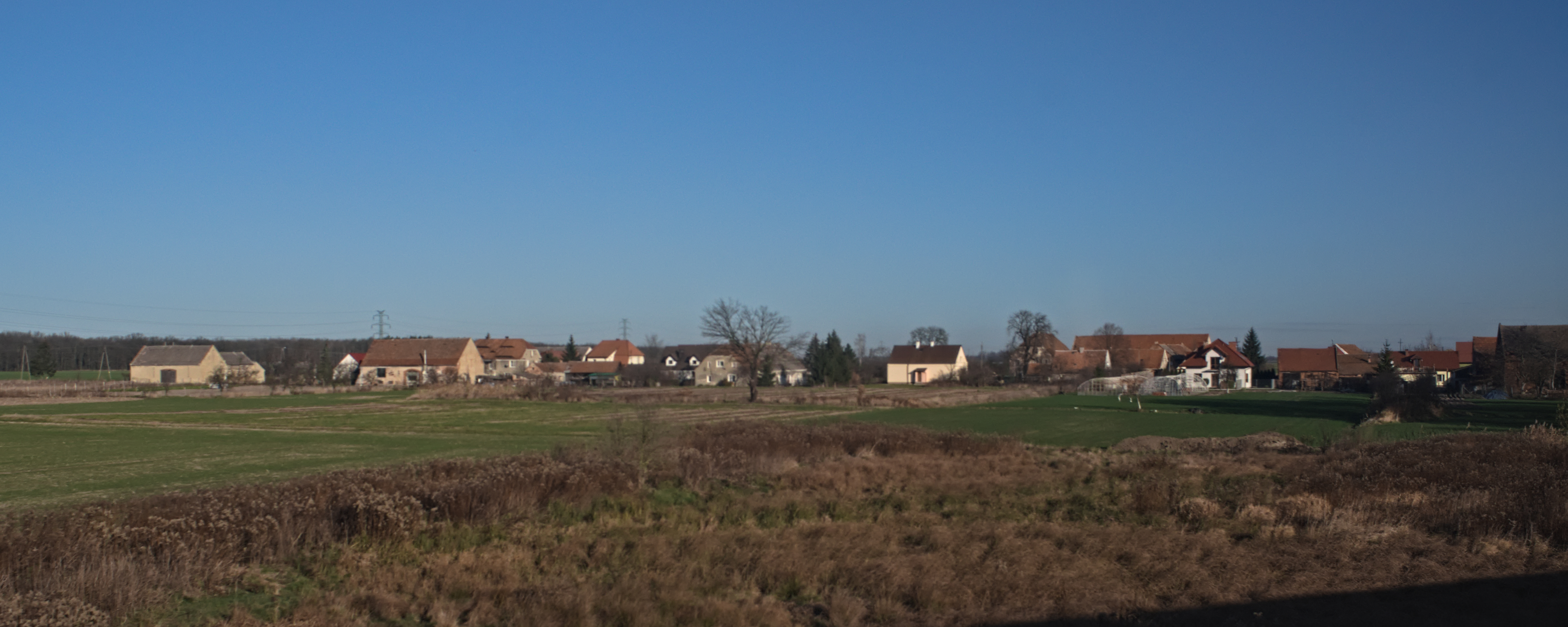
- Wszemiłowice, view from the South (2019)

- Location within Poland
- Coordinates: 51°02′48″N 16°46′28″E
- Country: Poland
- Voivodeship: Lower Silesian
- County: Wrocław
- Gmina: Kąty Wrocławskie

Wszemiłowice [fʂɛmiwɔˈvit͡sɛ] is a village in the administrative district of Gmina Kąty Wrocławskie, within Wrocław County, Lower Silesian Voivodeship, in south-western Poland.

== Monuments ==
- Baroque statue of St. John of Nepomuk
