= Kilianów =

- Village
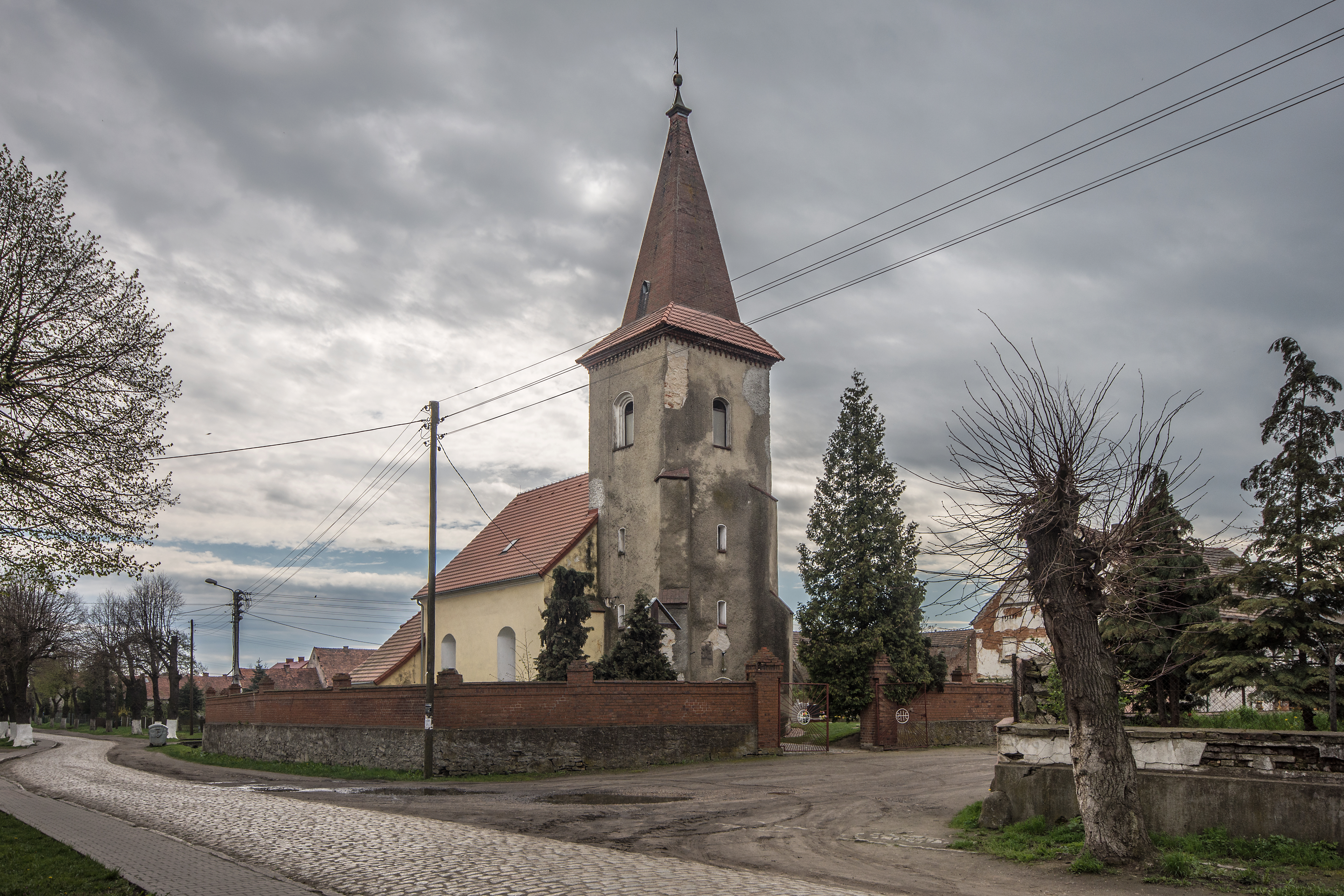
- Catholic church

- Location within Poland
- Coordinates: 51°00′16″N 16°44′37″E
- Country: Poland
- Voivodeship: Lower Silesian
- County: Wrocław
- Gmina: Kąty Wrocławskie

Kilianów [kiˈljanuf] is a village in the administrative district of Gmina Kąty Wrocławskie, within Wrocław County, Lower Silesian Voivodeship, in south-western Poland.

The family of German Chancellor Leo von Caprivi moved here from Koprivnik, Slovenia after being ennobled by the Habsburgs.
