= Gądów =

- Village
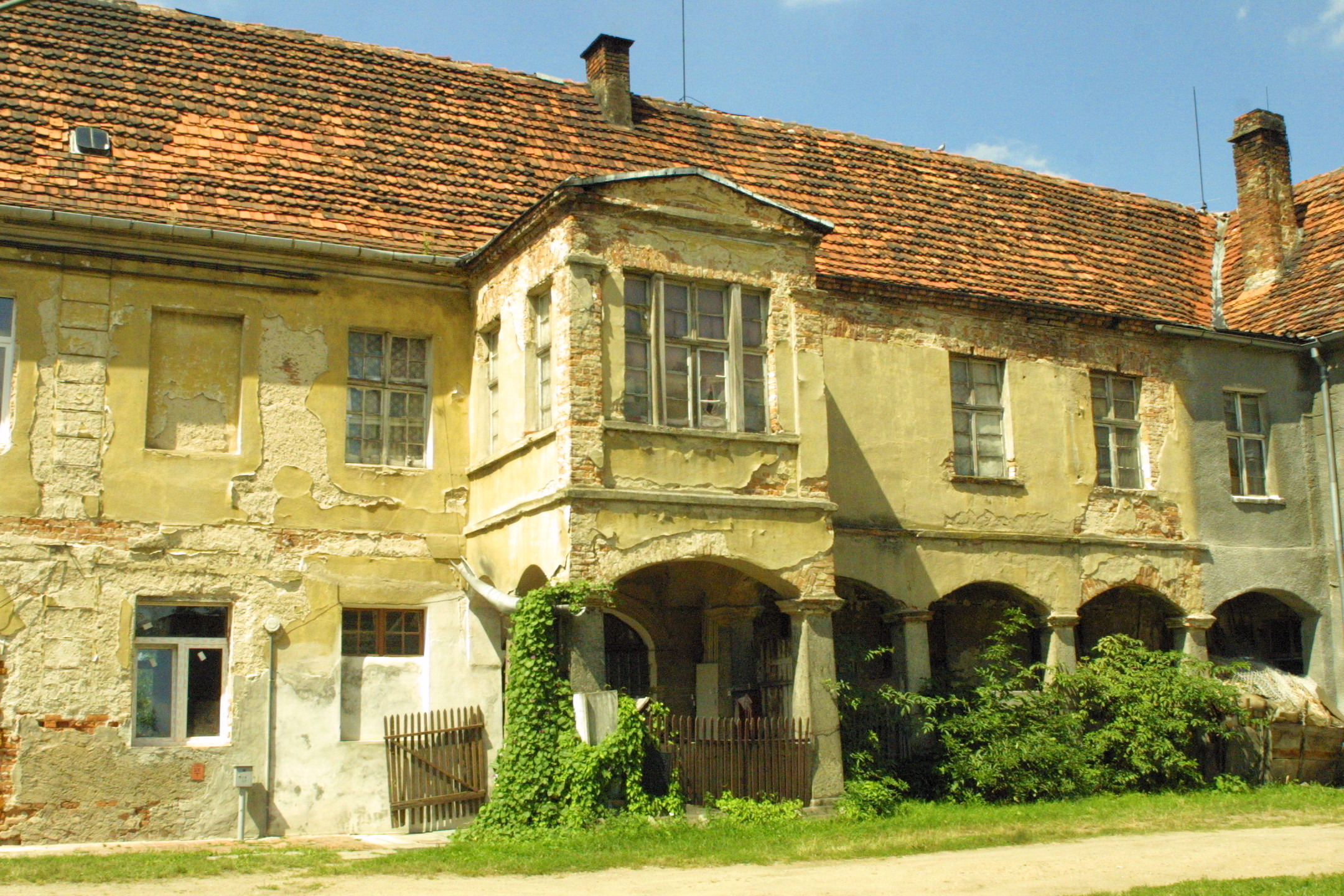
- Manor house

- Location within Poland
- Coordinates: 51°03′06″N 16°54′34″E
- Country: Poland
- Voivodeship: Lower Silesian
- County: Wrocław
- Gmina: Kąty Wrocławskie

Gądów [ˈɡɔnduf] is a village in the administrative district of Gmina Kąty Wrocławskie, within Wrocław County, Lower Silesian Voivodeship, in south-western Poland.
