= Rybnica, Wrocław County =

Rybnica
- Village
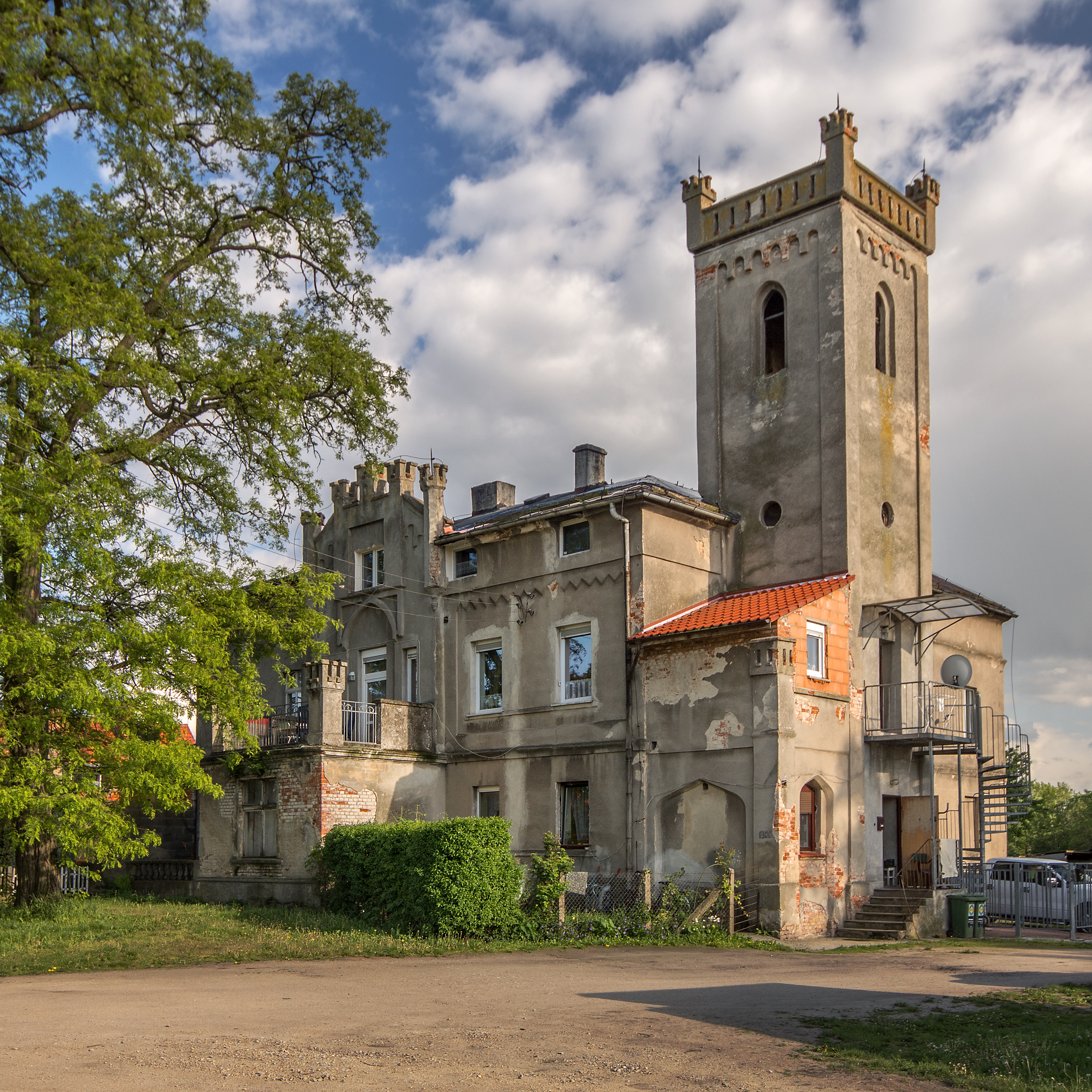
- Palace in Rybnica

- Location within Poland
- Coordinates: 51°03′30.6″N 16°51′40.6″E
- Country: Poland
- Voivodeship: Lower Silesian
- County: Wrocław
- Gmina: Kąty Wrocławskie
- Time zone: UTC+1 (CET)
  - Summer (DST): UTC+2 (CEST)
- Vehicle registration: DWR

Rybnica [rɨbˈnit͡sa] is a village in the administrative district of Gmina Kąty Wrocławskie, within Wrocław County, Lower Silesian Voivodeship, in south-western Poland.

The village was first mentioned in 1288, when it was part of fragmented Piast-ruled Poland. The name of the village is of Polish origin and comes from the word ryba, which means "fish".
