= Różaniec, Lower Silesian Voivodeship =

Różaniec
- Village
- Location within Poland
- Coordinates: 51°01′52″N 16°49′04″E
- Country: Poland
- Voivodeship: Lower Silesian
- County: Wrocław
- Gmina: Kąty Wrocławskie

Różaniec [ruˈʐaɲɛt͡s] is a village in the administrative district of Gmina Kąty Wrocławskie, within Wrocław County, Lower Silesian Voivodeship, in south-western Poland.
