= Gmina Kąty Wrocławskie =

Gmina Kąty Wrocławskie Kąty Wrocławskie Commune
- Gmina
- Flag Coat of arms
- Interactive map of Gmina Kąty Wrocławskie
- Coordinates (Kąty Wrocławskie): 51°02′N 16°46′E
- Country: Poland
- Voivodeship: Lower Silesian
- County: Wrocław
- Seat: Kąty Wrocławskie

Area
  - Total: 176.5 km^{2} (68.1 sq mi)

Population (2019-06-30)
  - Total: 24,927
  - Density: 141.2/km^{2} (365.8/sq mi)
  - Urban: 6,994
  - Rural: 17,933
- Website: https://www.katywroclawskie.pl

Gmina Kąty Wrocławskie is an urban-rural gmina (administrative district) in Wrocław County, Lower Silesian Voivodeship, in south-western Poland. Its seat is the town of Kąty Wrocławskie, which lies approximately 22 kilometres (14 mi) south-west of the regional capital Wrocław. It is part of the Wrocław metropolitan area.

The gmina covers an area of 176.5 square kilometres (68.1 sq mi), and as of 2019, its total population was 24,927.

== Neighbouring gminas ==
Gmina Kąty Wrocławskie is bordered by the city of Wrocław and by the gminas of Kobierzyce, Kostomłoty, Miękinia, Mietków and Sobótka.

== Villages ==
Apart from the town of Kąty Wrocławskie, the gmina contains the villages of Baranowice, Bliż, Bogdaszowice, Cesarzowice, Czerńczyce, Gądów, Gniechowice, Górzyce, Jaszkotle, Jurczyce, Kamionna, Kębłowice, Kilianów, Kozłów, Krobielowice, Krzeptów, Małkowice, Mokronos Dolny, Mokronos Górny, Nowa Wieś Kącka, Nowa Wieś Wrocławska, Pełcznica, Pietrzykowice, Romnów, Różaniec, Rybnica, Sadków, Sadkówek, Sadowice, Samotwór, Skałka, Smolec, Sokolniki, Sośnica, Stary Dwór, Stoszyce, Stradów, Strzeganowice, Szymanów, Wojtkowice, Wszemiłowice, Zabrodzie, Zachowice and Zybiszów.

== Twin towns – sister cities ==
Gmina Kąty Wrocławskie is twinned with:

- Biblis, Germany
- Mignaloux-Beauvoir, France
- Svitlovodsk Raion, Ukraine
- Żerków, Poland
