= Zabrodzie, Lower Silesian Voivodeship =

Zabrodzie
- Village
- Location within Poland
- Coordinates: 51°3′24″N 16°56′31″E
- Country: Poland
- Voivodeship: Lower Silesian
- County: Wrocław
- Gmina: Kąty Wrocławskie

Zabrodzie [zaˈbrɔd͡ʑɛ] is a village in the administrative district of Gmina Kąty Wrocławskie, within Wrocław County, Lower Silesian Voivodeship, in south-western Poland.
