= Pełcznica (river) =

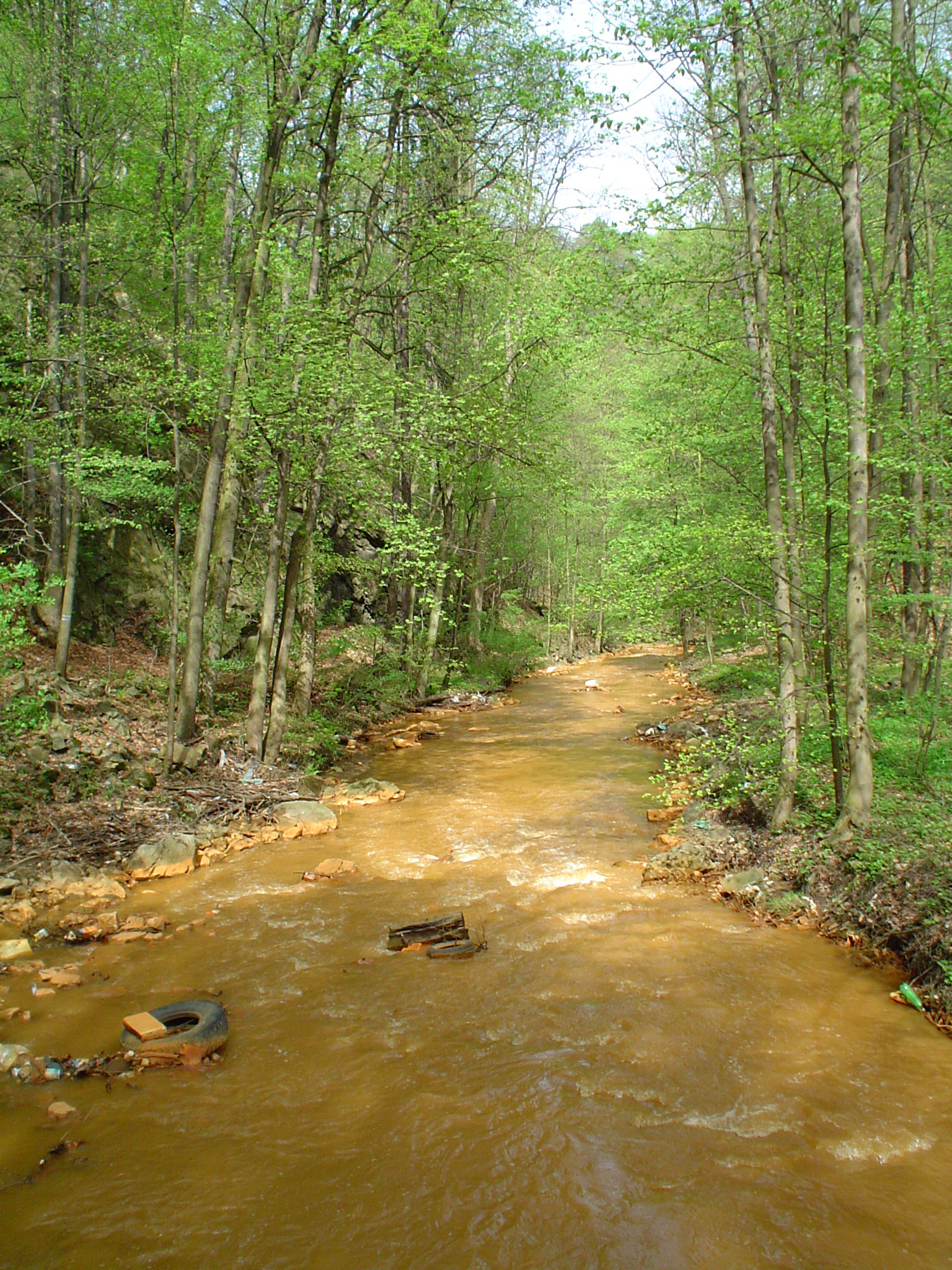

Location
- Country: Poland

Physical characteristics
- Mouth
  - location: Strzegomka
  - coordinates: 50°57′32″N 16°24′51″E

Basin features
- Progression: Strzegomka→ Bystrzyca→ Oder→ Baltic Sea

Pełcznica is a river of Poland, a tributary of the Strzegomka.

The Pełcznica River is located in Lower Silesia, and is the largest tributary of the Strzegomka, 39 km. in length. The source of the river begins above Wałbrzych, in the Wałbrzych Mountains, on the northern slopes of the Sylvan Massif, near the old Glinik. It is about 450 meters above sea level, and flows through Wałbrzych and Świebodzice.

The Wałbrzych segment is partially channeled and flows under the city, visible on the surface only from the Old Spa district. Between Wałbrzych and Świebodzicami, the river creates an important element of Książański Landscape Park. It flows into Strzegomka, near the village Skarżyce as its right tributary.

Larger tributaries of the river are the streams: Sobięcinka, Poniatówka, Lubiechowski Potok and Szczawnik. Currently the water from Pełcznica varies from I to III grade purity. The river is heavily polluted with sludge from sedimentation tanks and flotation coal coking at Wałbrzych mines. An old sewage works nearby and pumps raw sewage into the river when sewage volumes get too much for the old pumping system. The river discolouration from pollution is a heavy dark brown giving off a slight chemical odour. The source of the pollution is near Legnicka Road, where the polytechnic college is situated (Politechnika Wrocławska w Wałbrzychu). The pollution being pumped into the river has killed off all life in and around the river.
