= Mokronos Dolny =

- Village
- Location within Poland
- Coordinates: 51°04′16″N 16°56′05″E
- Country: Poland
- Voivodeship: Lower Silesian
- County: Wrocław
- Gmina: Kąty Wrocławskie

Mokronos Dolny [mɔˈkrɔnɔs ˈdɔlnɨ] is a village in the administrative district of Gmina Kąty Wrocławskie, within Wrocław County, Lower Silesian Voivodeship, in south-western Poland.
