= Cesarzowice, Wrocław County =

Cesarzowice
- Village
- Location within Poland
- Coordinates: 51°03′42″N 16°55′27″E
- Country: Poland
- Voivodeship: Lower Silesian
- County: Wrocław
- Gmina: Kąty Wrocławskie

Cesarzowice [t͡sɛsaʐɔˈvit͡sɛ] is a village in the administrative district of Gmina Kąty Wrocławskie, within Wrocław County, Lower Silesian Voivodeship, in south-western Poland.
