= Sadkówek =

- Village
- Location within Poland
- Coordinates: 51°02′32″N 16°47′50″E
- Country: Poland
- Voivodeship: Lower Silesian
- County: Wrocław
- Gmina: Kąty Wrocławskie

Sadkówek [satˈkuvɛk] is a village in the administrative district of Gmina Kąty Wrocławskie, within Wrocław County, Lower Silesian Voivodeship, in south-western Poland.
