= Bystrzyca (Oder) =

Bystrzyca Świdnicką
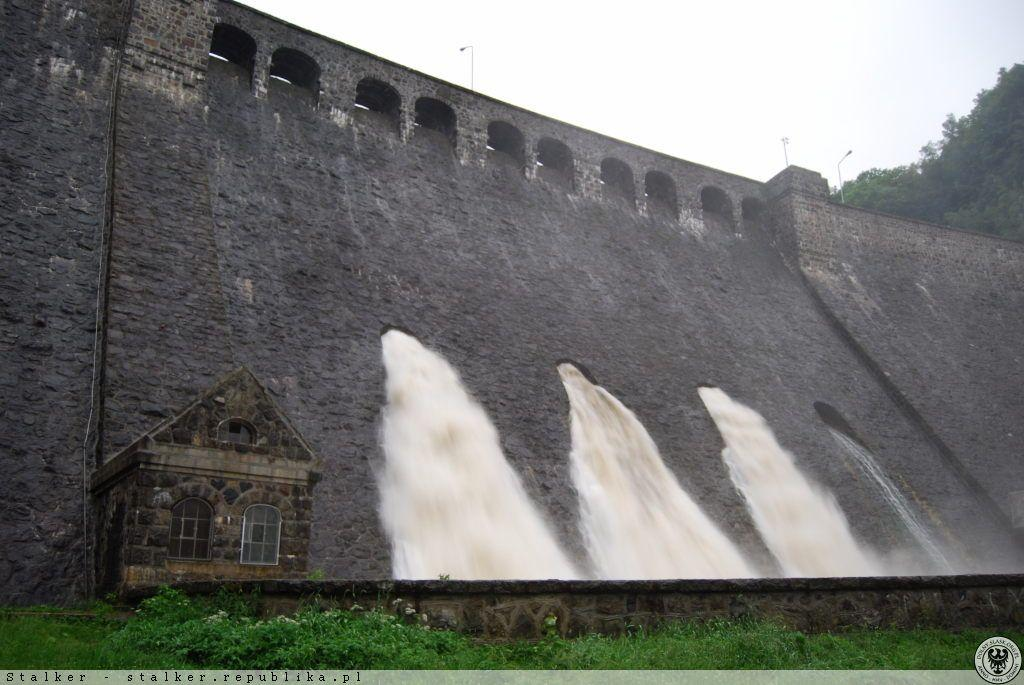

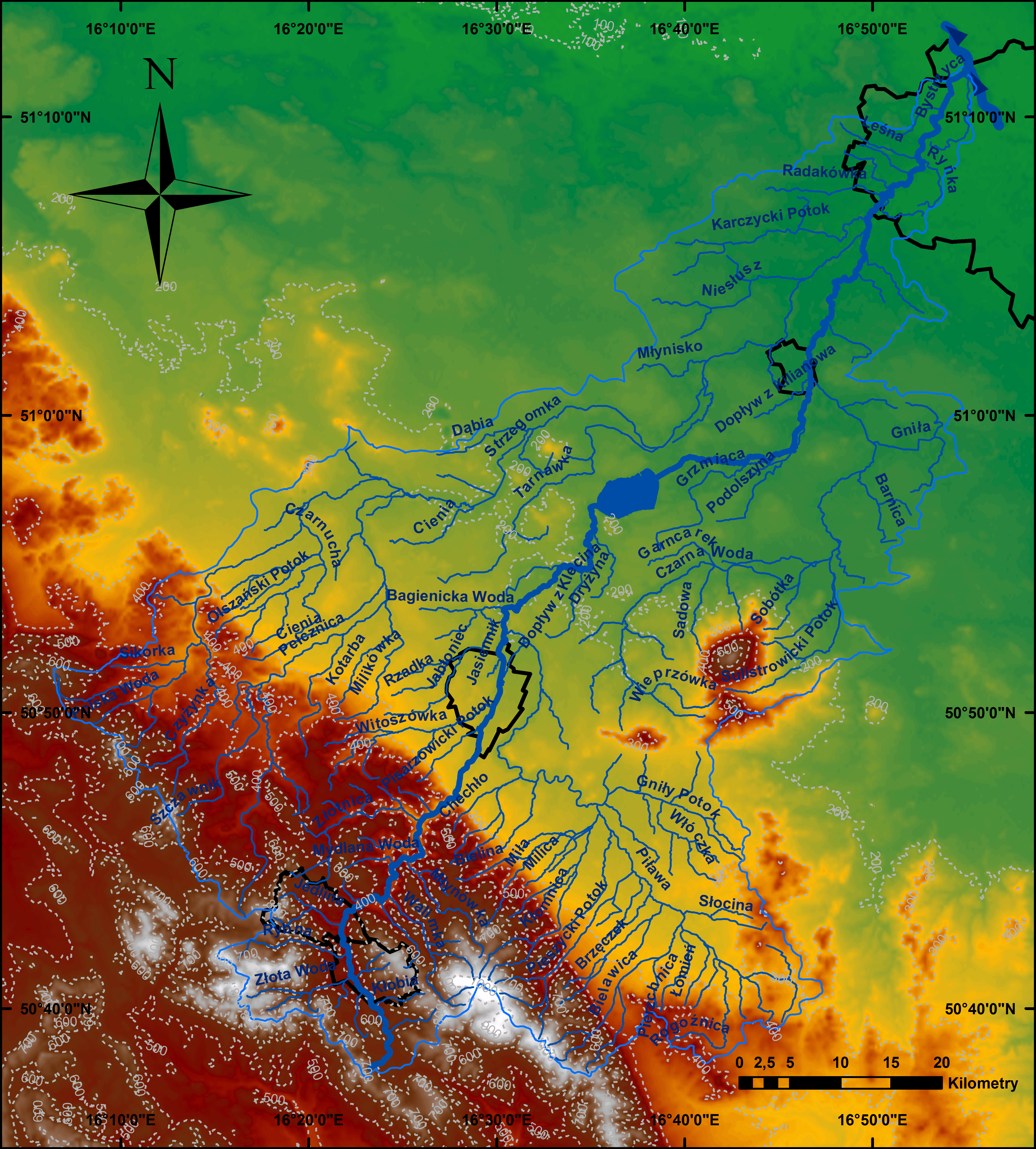
- Map of Bystrzyca river and its basin.

Location
- Country: Poland

Physical characteristics
- Mouth
  - location: Oder
  - coordinates: 51°11′41″N 16°55′03″E
- Length: 95 km (59 mi)
- Basin size: 1,768 km^{2} (683 sq mi)

Basin features
- Progression: Oder→ Baltic Sea

The Bystrzyca is a river of Poland, a left tributary of the Oder, which it meets a few kilometers north (downstream) from Wrocław.

The Bystrzyca was dammed in 1917 near the village of Lubachów (then: Breitenhain in Germany) to create Lake Lubachowskie, and dammed at Mietków in 1974 to create the large reservoir Zalew Mietkowski. The river also forms the western boundary of the Owl Mountains range in the Central Sudetes.

Among its tributaries is the Strzegomka.

== See also ==
- Bystrzyca (disambiguation)
