= Kamionna, Lower Silesian Voivodeship =

Kamionna
- Village
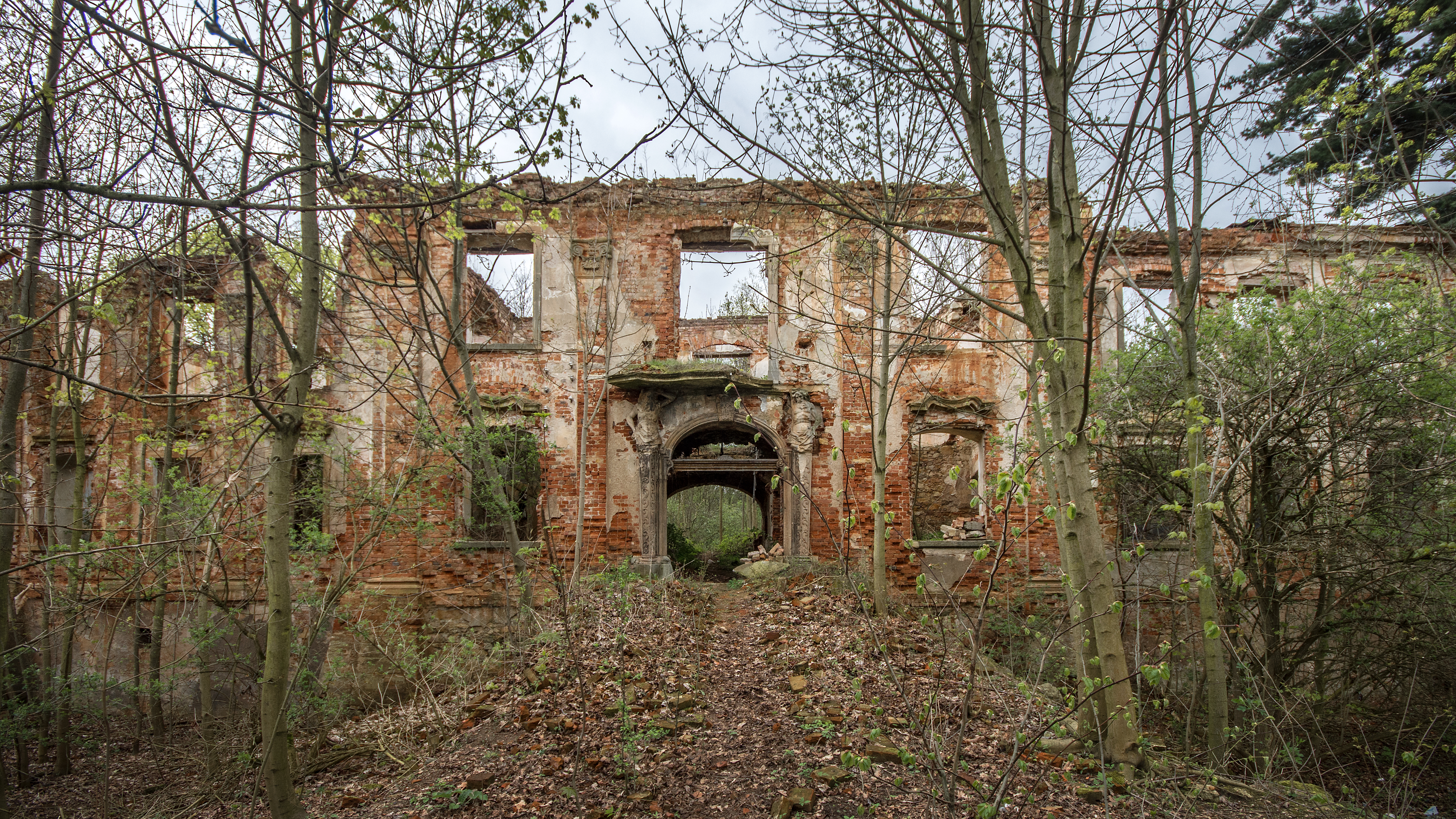
- Former palace

- Location within Poland
- Coordinates: 50°58′52″N 16°45′03″E
- Country: Poland
- Voivodeship: Lower Silesian
- County: Wrocław
- Gmina: Kąty Wrocławskie

Kamionna [kaˈmjɔnna] is a village in the administrative district of Gmina Kąty Wrocławskie, within Wrocław County, Lower Silesian Voivodeship, in south-western Poland.
