= Pełcznica, Lower Silesian Voivodeship =

Pełcznica
- Village
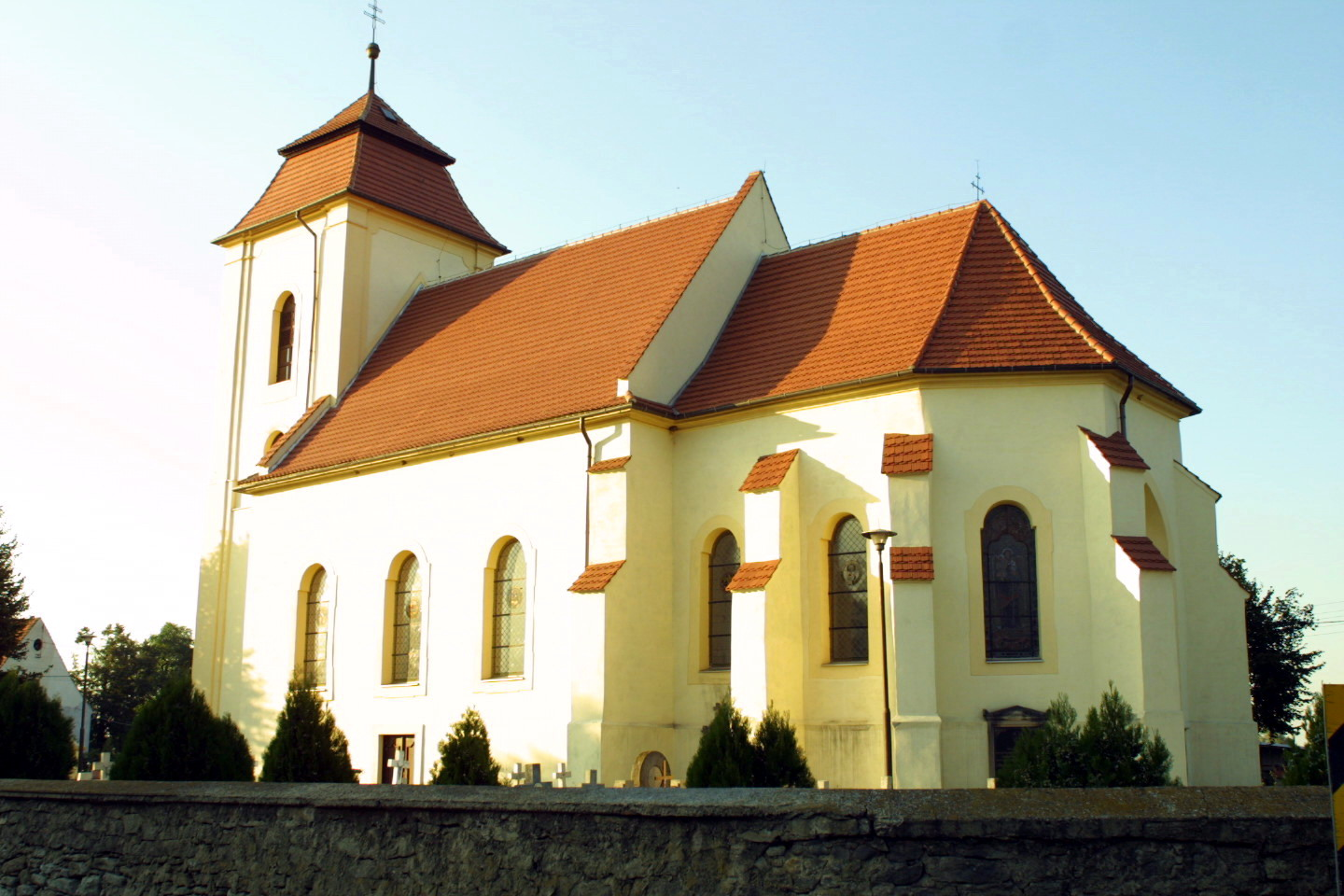
- Saint Nicholas church in Pełcznica

- Location within Poland
- Coordinates: 51°02′31″N 16°44′06″E
- Country: Poland
- Voivodeship: Lower Silesian
- County: Wrocław
- Gmina: Kąty Wrocławskie

Pełcznica [pɛu̯t͡ʂˈnit͡sa] is a village in the administrative district of Gmina Kąty Wrocławskie, within Wrocław County, Lower Silesian Voivodeship, in south-western Poland.
