= Górzyce =

- Village
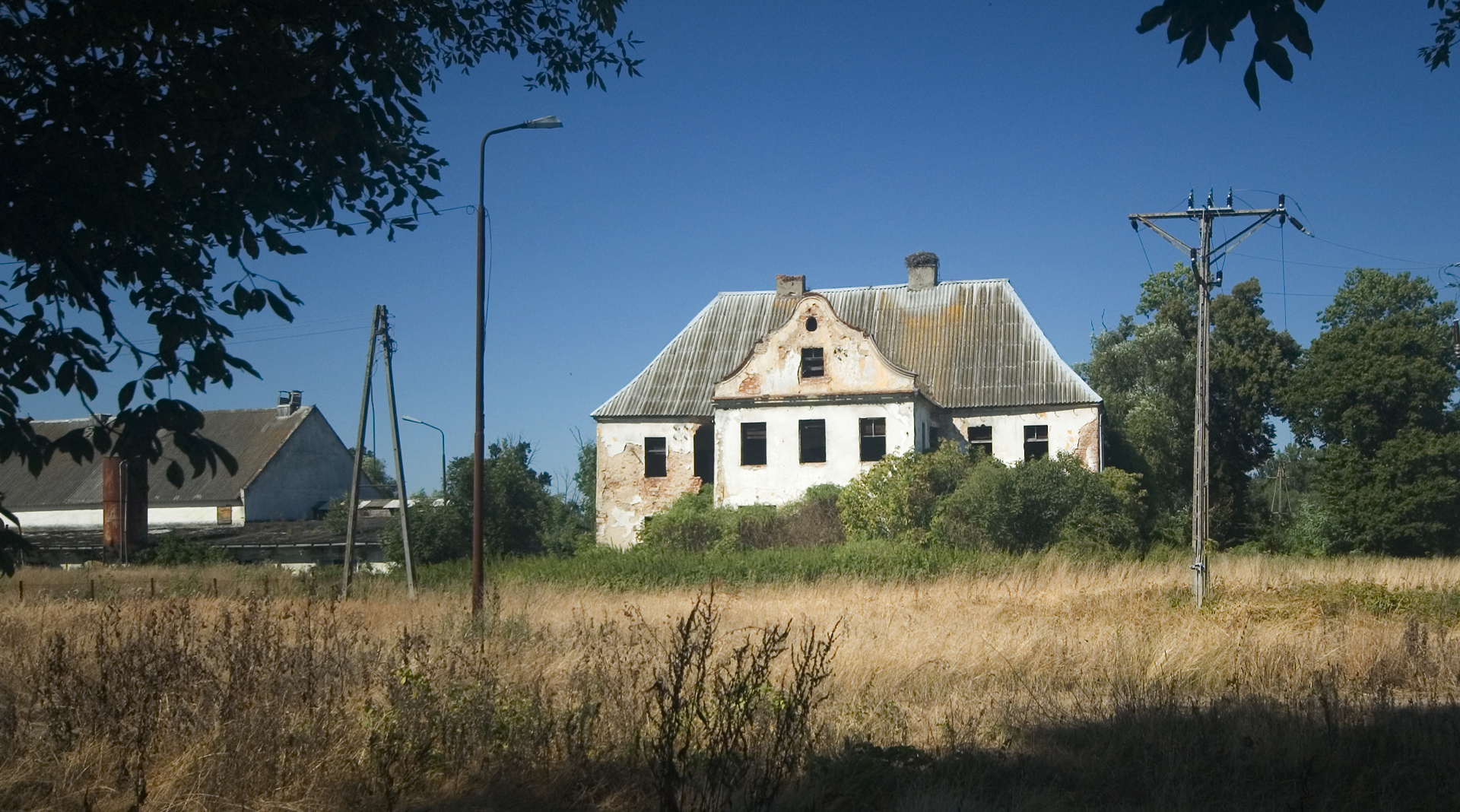
- Old manor house in Górzyce

- Location within Poland
- Coordinates: 50°57′56″N 16°49′53″E
- Country: Poland
- Voivodeship: Lower Silesian
- County: Wrocław
- Gmina: Kąty Wrocławskie
- Vehicle registration: DWR

Górzyce [ɡuˈʐɨt͡sɛ] is a village in the administrative district of Gmina Kąty Wrocławskie, within Wrocław County, Lower Silesian Voivodeship, in south-western Poland.

The name of the village is of Polish origin and comes from the word góra which means "hill".
