= Samotwór =

- Village
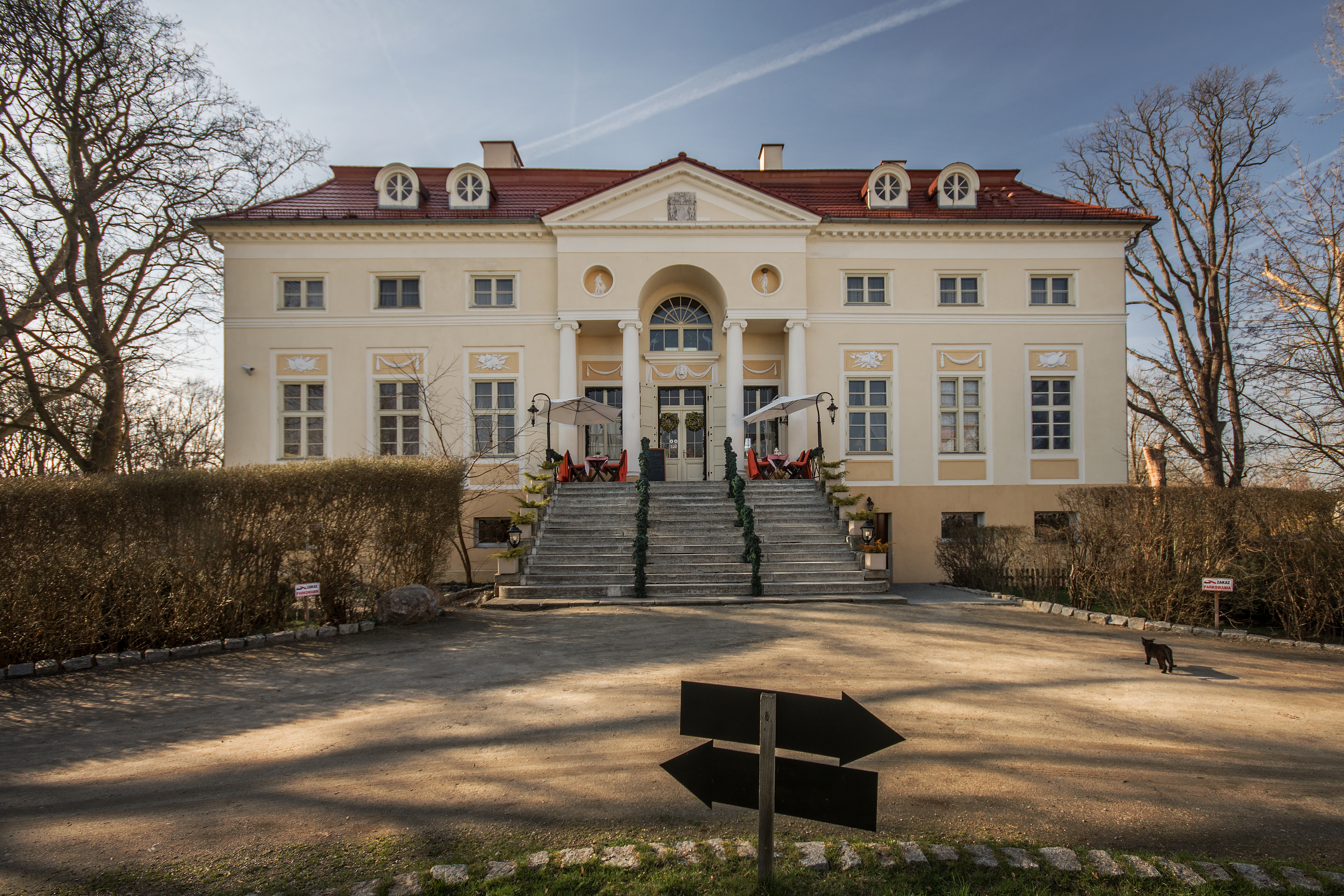

- Location within Poland
- Coordinates: 51°6′12″N 16°49′52″E
- Country: Poland
- Voivodeship: Lower Silesian
- County: Wrocław
- Gmina: Kąty Wrocławskie

Samotwór [saˈmɔtfur] is a village in the administrative district of Gmina Kąty Wrocławskie, within Wrocław County, Lower Silesian Voivodeship, in south-western Poland.
