= Jurczyce, Wrocław County =

Jurczyce
- Village
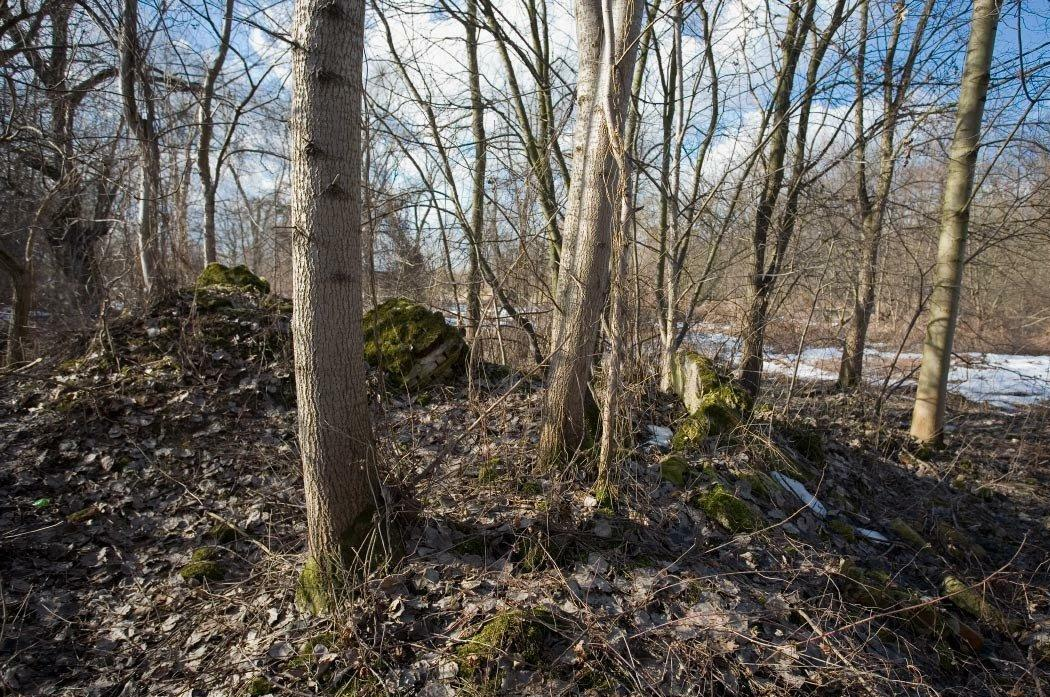

- Location within Poland
- Coordinates: 51°1′N 16°43′E
- Country: Poland
- Voivodeship: Lower Silesian
- County: Wrocław
- Gmina: Kąty Wrocławskie

Jurczyce [jurˈt͡ʂɨt͡sɛ] is a village in the administrative district of Gmina Kąty Wrocławskie, within Wrocław County, Lower Silesian Voivodeship, in south-western Poland.
