= Mnichowice =

Mnichowice may refer to the following places in Poland:

- Mnichowice, Lower Silesian Voivodeship (south-west Poland)
- Mnichowice, Greater Poland Voivodeship (west-central Poland)
