= Polakowice =

- Village
- Location within Poland
- Coordinates: 50°56′N 17°4′E
- Country: Poland
- Voivodeship: Lower Silesian
- County: Wrocław
- Gmina: Żórawina

Polakowice [pɔlakɔˈvit͡sɛ] is a village in the administrative district of Gmina Żórawina, within Wrocław County, Lower Silesian Voivodeship, in south-western Poland.

== Name ==
The town was first recorded in a Latin document as Pologwitz in 1251. It has also been referred to as Polackowicz (1349), Bolkwicz (1360), Polockwitz (1408), Polokowicz (1456), Pologowitz (1630), Polockwitz/Polckowitz (1669), and Pologwitz (1736). In 1613, Nicholas Henel referred to the town with the Latin name Polocovvitz.
