= Węgry =

Węgry may refer to:

- Polish name for Hungary
- Węgry, Lower Silesian Voivodeship (south-west Poland)
- Węgry, Greater Poland Voivodeship (west-central Poland)
- Węgry, Opole Voivodeship (south-west Poland)
- Węgry, Pomeranian Voivodeship (north Poland)

== See also ==
- Węgrów (disambiguation)
