= Milejowice =

Milejowice may refer to the following places in Poland:

- Milejowice, Lower Silesian Voivodeship (south-west Poland)
- Milejowice, Świętokrzyskie Voivodeship (south-central Poland)
- Milejowice, Masovian Voivodeship (east-central Poland)
