= Wilczków, Wrocław County =

Wilczków
- Village
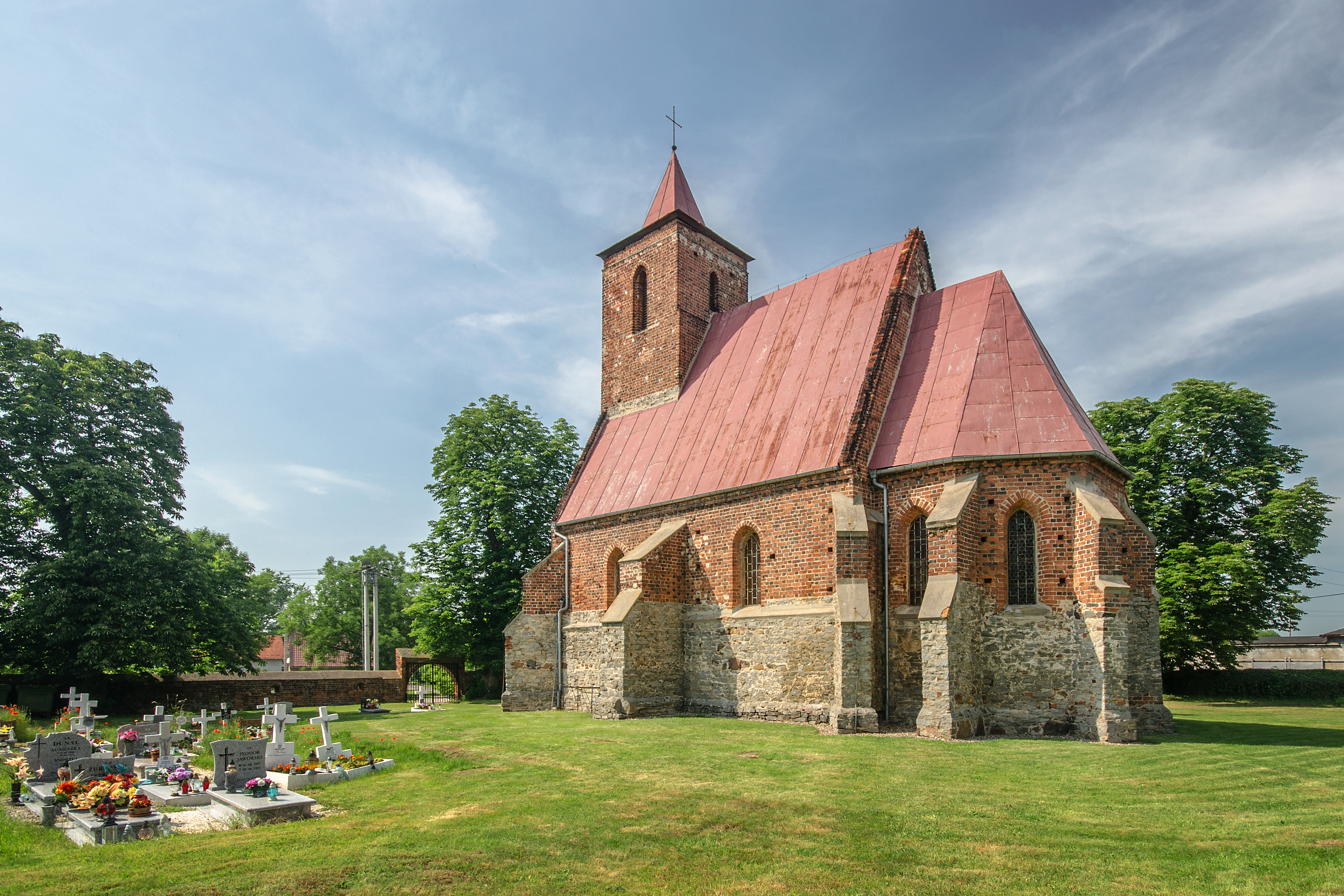
- Catholic church

- Location within Poland
- Coordinates: 50°58′05″N 16°58′55″E
- Country: Poland
- Voivodeship: Lower Silesian
- County: Wrocław
- Gmina: Żórawina
- Population: 420

Wilczków [ˈvilt͡ʂkuf] is a village in the administrative district of Gmina Żórawina, within Wrocław County, Lower Silesian Voivodeship, in south-western Poland.

== Monuments ==
- Medieval stone crosses (probably conciliation crosses)
