= Wilkowice, Lower Silesian Voivodeship =

Wilkowice
- Village
- Location within Poland
- Coordinates: 50°56′57″N 17°5′30″E
- Country: Poland
- Voivodeship: Lower Silesian
- County: Wrocław
- Gmina: Żórawina
- Population: 60

Wilkowice [vilkɔˈvit͡sɛ] is a village in the administrative district of Gmina Żórawina, within Wrocław County, Lower Silesian Voivodeship, in south-western Poland.
