= Nowojowice =

- Village
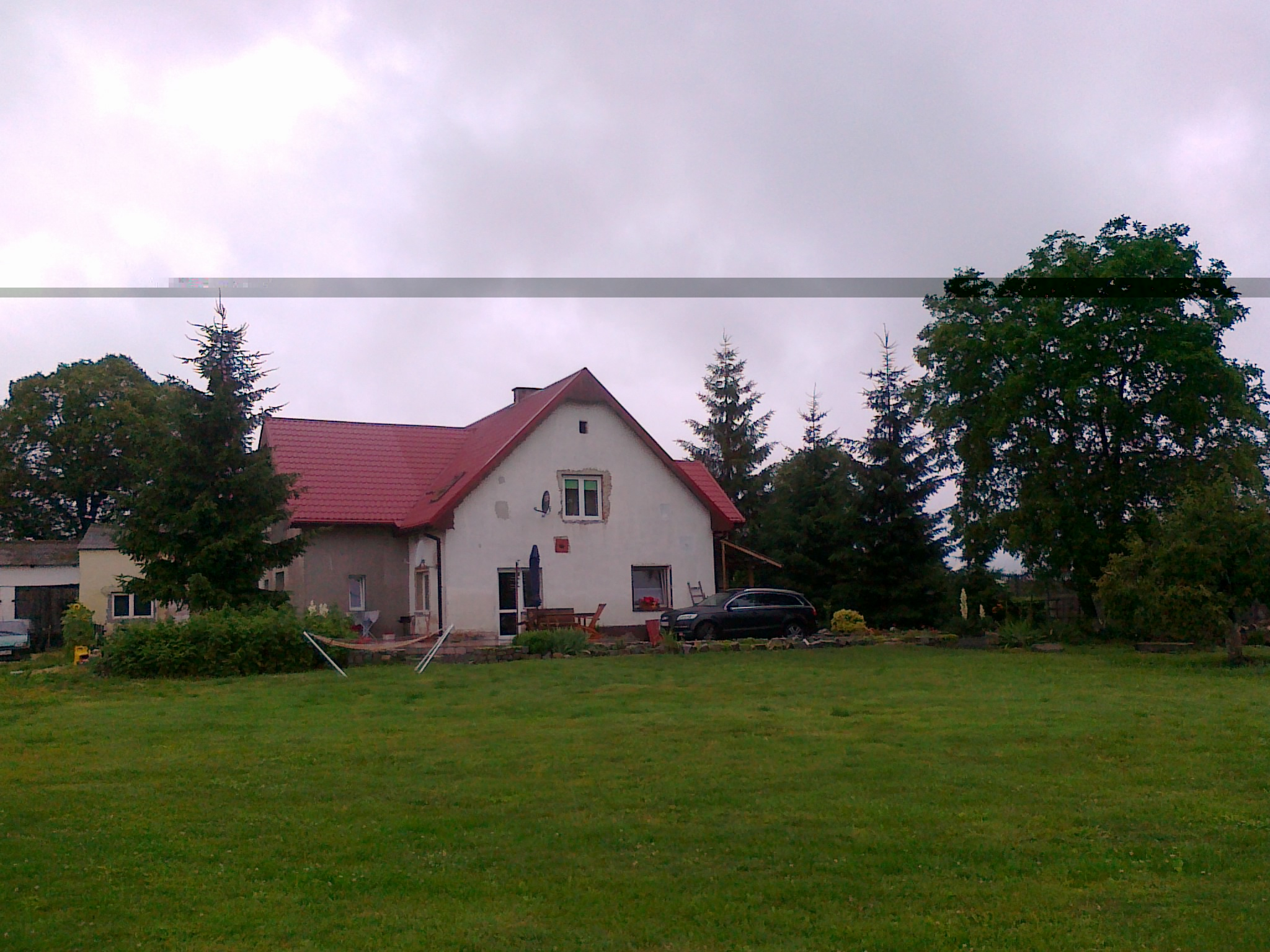

- Location within Poland
- Coordinates: 50°54′44″N 17°3′55″E
- Country: Poland
- Voivodeship: Lower Silesian
- County: Wrocław
- Gmina: Żórawina

Nowojowice [nɔvɔjɔˈvit͡sɛ] is a village in the administrative district of Gmina Żórawina, within Wrocław County, Lower Silesian Voivodeship, in south-western Poland.
