= Gmina Żórawina =

Gmina Żórawina Żórawina Commune
- Gmina
- Flag Coat of arms
- Interactive map of Gmina Żórawina
- Coordinates (Żórawina): 50°59′N 17°03′E
- Country: Poland
- Voivodeship: Lower Silesian
- County: Wrocław
- Seat: Żórawina
- Sołectwos: Bogunów, Bratowice-Zagródki, Galowice, Jaksonów, Jarosławice, Karwiany-Komorowice, Krajków, Mędłów, Milejowice, Mnichowice, Nowojowice, Nowy Śleszów, Okrzeszyce-Rynakowice, Polakowice, Przecławice, Racławice Małe, Rzeplin-Szukalice, Stary Śleszów, Suchy Dwór, Turów, Węgry-Brzeście-Marcinkowice, Wilczków, Wilkowice, Wojkowice, Żerniki Wielkie, Żórawina

Area
  - Total: 120.11 km^{2} (46.37 sq mi)

Population (2019-06-30)
  - Total: 10,967
  - Density: 91.308/km^{2} (236.49/sq mi)
- Website: http://www.gminazorawina.pl

Gmina Żórawina is a rural gmina (administrative district) in Wrocław County, Lower Silesian Voivodeship, in south-western Poland. Its seat is the village of Żórawina, which lies approximately 16 kilometres (10 mi) south of the regional capital Wrocław.

The gmina covers an area of 120.11 square kilometres (46.4 sq mi), and as of 2019 its total population is 10,967. It is part of the Wrocław metropolitan area.

== Neighbouring gminas ==
Gmina Żórawina is bordered by the gminas of Borów, Domaniów, Kobierzyce and Siechnice.

== Villages ==
The gmina contains the villages of Bogunów, Bratowice, Brzeście, Galowice, Jaksonów, Jarosławice, Karwiany, Komorowice, Krajków, Marcinkowice, Mędłów, Milejowice, Mnichowice, Nowojowice, Nowy Śleszów, Okrzeszyce, Pasterzyce, Polakowice, Przecławice, Racławice Małe, Rynakowice, Rzeplin, Stary Śleszów, Suchy Dwór, Szukalice, Turów, Węgry, Wilczków, Wilkowice, Wojkowice, Zagródki, Żerniki Wielkie and Żórawina.
