= Karwiany =

- Village
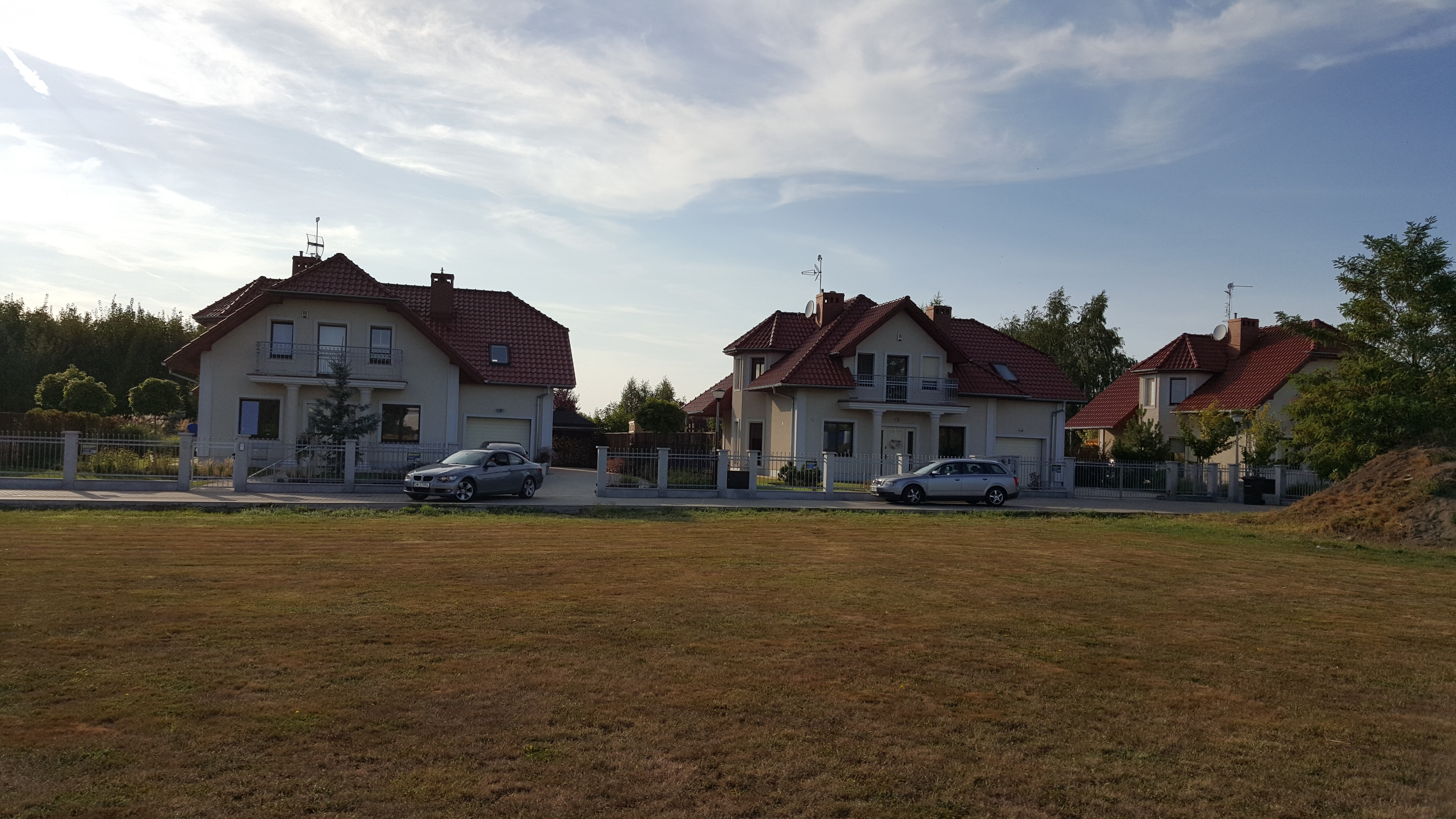
- Fiołkowa, Karwiana - panoramio

- Location within Poland
- Coordinates: 51°01′14″N 17°00′39″E
- Country: Poland
- Voivodeship: Lower Silesian
- County: Wrocław
- Gmina: Żórawina

Karwiany [karˈvjanɨ] is a village in the administrative district of Gmina Żórawina, within Wrocław County, Lower Silesian Voivodeship, in south-western Poland.
