= Nowy Śleszów =

- Village
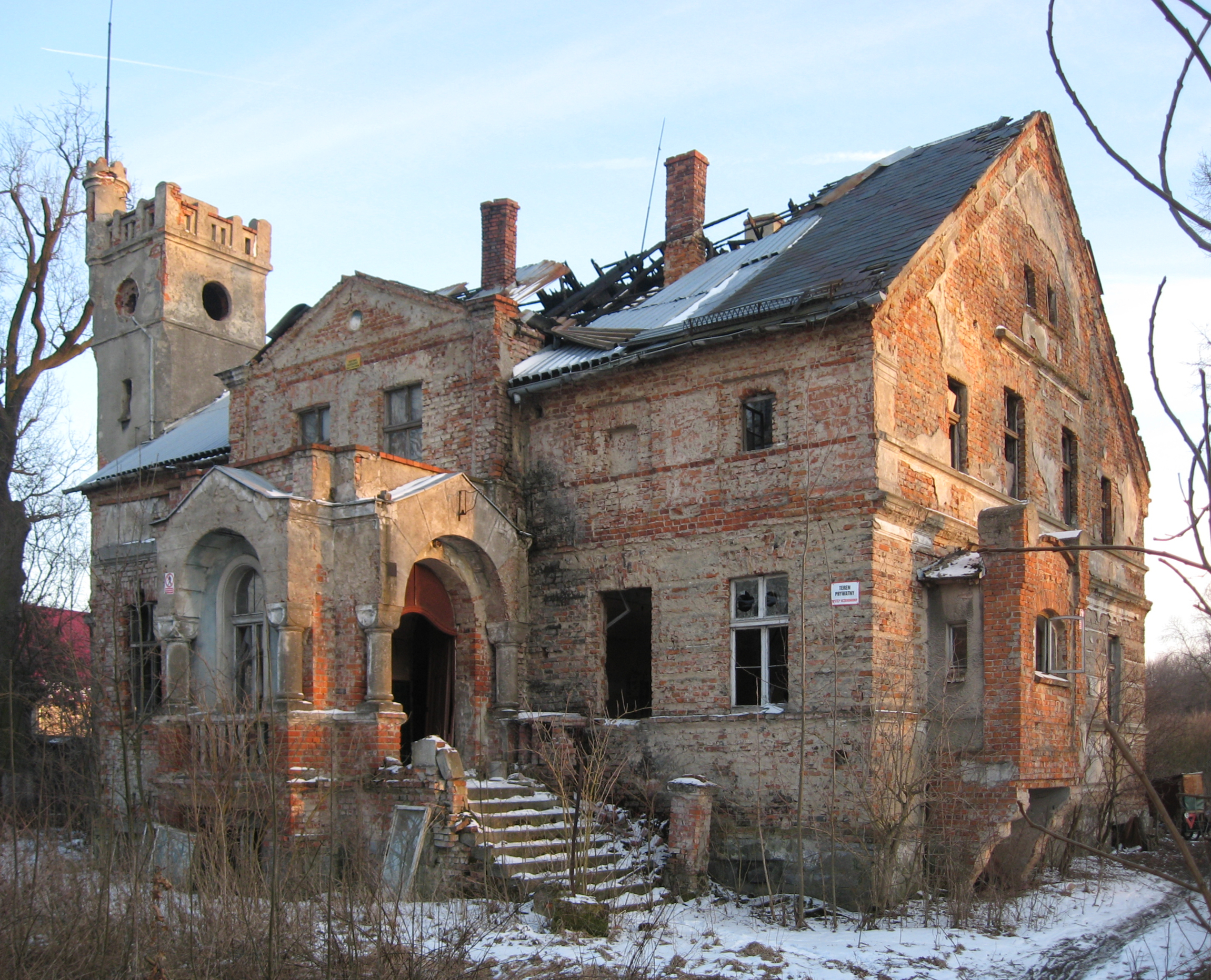
- Manor house

- Location within Poland
- Coordinates: 50°56′0″N 17°6′21″E
- Country: Poland
- Voivodeship: Lower Silesian
- County: Wrocław
- Gmina: Żórawina

Nowy Śleszów [ˈnɔvɨ ˈɕlɛʂuf] is a village in the administrative district of Gmina Żórawina, within Wrocław County, Lower Silesian Voivodeship, in south-western Poland.
