= Stary Śleszów =

- Village
- Location within Poland
- Coordinates: 50°56′12″N 17°4′33″E
- Country: Poland
- Voivodeship: Lower Silesian
- County: Wrocław
- Gmina: Żórawina

Stary Śleszów [ˈstarɨ ˈɕlɛʂuf] is a village in the administrative district of Gmina Żórawina, within Wrocław County, Lower Silesian Voivodeship, in south-western Poland.
