= Krajków, Lower Silesian Voivodeship =

Krajków
- Village
- Location within Poland
- Coordinates: 50°57′38″N 17°3′51″E
- Country: Poland
- Voivodeship: Lower Silesian
- County: Wrocław
- Gmina: Żórawina

Krajków [ˈkrai̯kuf] is a village in the administrative district of Gmina Żórawina, within Wrocław County, Lower Silesian Voivodeship, in south-western Poland.
