= Rzeplin, Lower Silesian Voivodeship =

Rzeplin
- Village
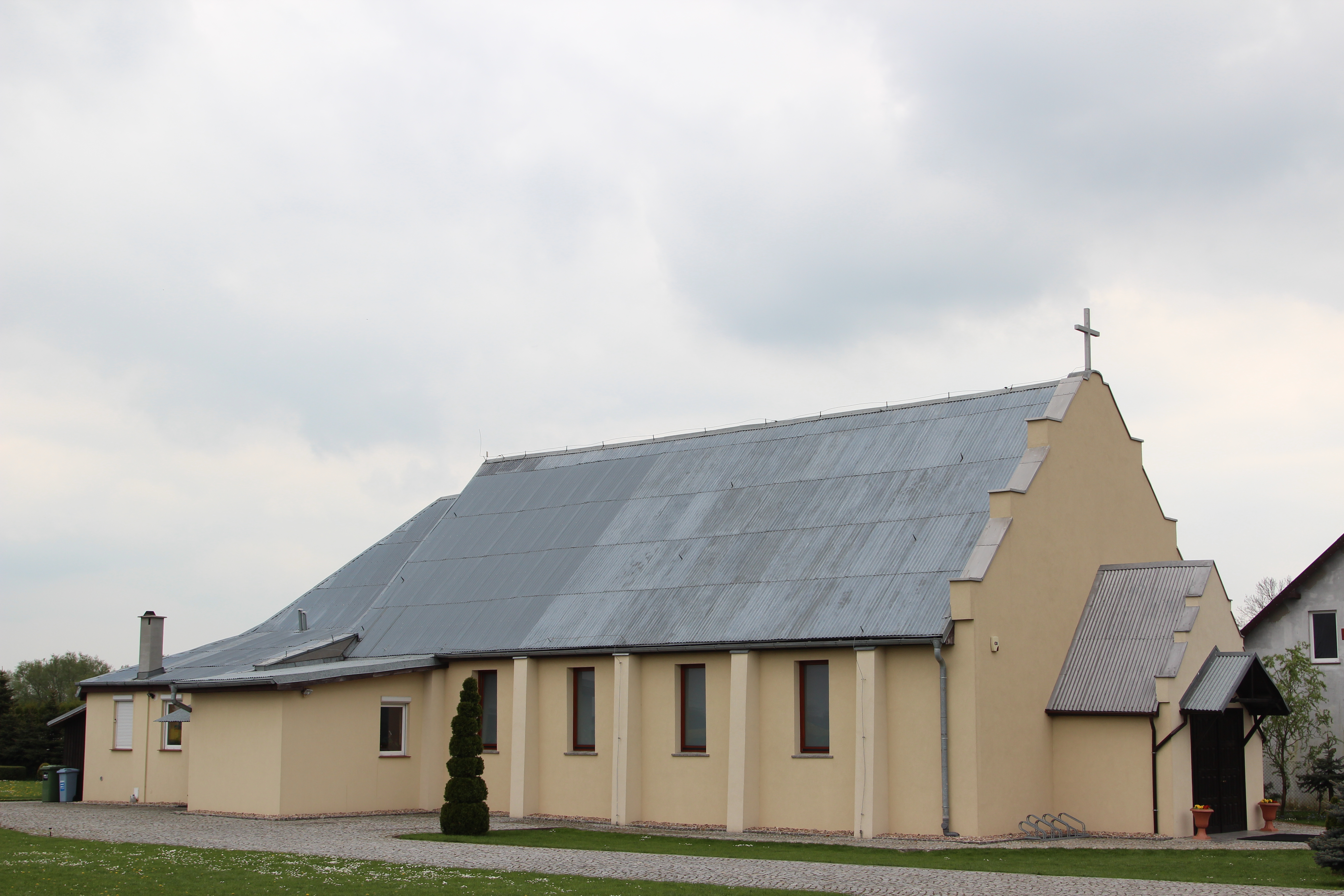
- Church of Divine Mercy in Rzeplin

- Location within Poland
- Coordinates: 51°0′N 17°1′E
- Country: Poland
- Voivodeship: Lower Silesian
- County: Wrocław
- Gmina: Żórawina

Rzeplin [ˈʐɛplin] is a village in the administrative district of Gmina Żórawina, within Wrocław County, Lower Silesian Voivodeship, in south-western Poland.
