= Rynakowice =

- Village
- Location within Poland
- Coordinates: 50°57′49″N 17°7′29″E
- Country: Poland
- Voivodeship: Lower Silesian
- County: Wrocław
- Gmina: Żórawina
- Population: 39

Rynakowice [rɨnakɔˈvit͡sɛ] is a village in the administrative district of Gmina Żórawina, within Wrocław County, Lower Silesian Voivodeship, in south-western Poland.
