= Węgrów (disambiguation) =

Węgrów is a town in eastern Poland; the capital of Węgrów Country.

Węgrów may also refer to:

- Węgrów County, a unit of territorial administration and local government (powiat) in Masovian Voivodeship
- Węgrów, Lower Silesian Voivodeship, a village in the administrative district of Gmina Długołęka, Wrocław County
- Battle of Węgrów, important skirmish of January Uprising in the Russian Partition of Poland

== See also ==
- Węgry (disambiguation)
- Wegrow (disambiguation)
