= Jaksonów =

- Village
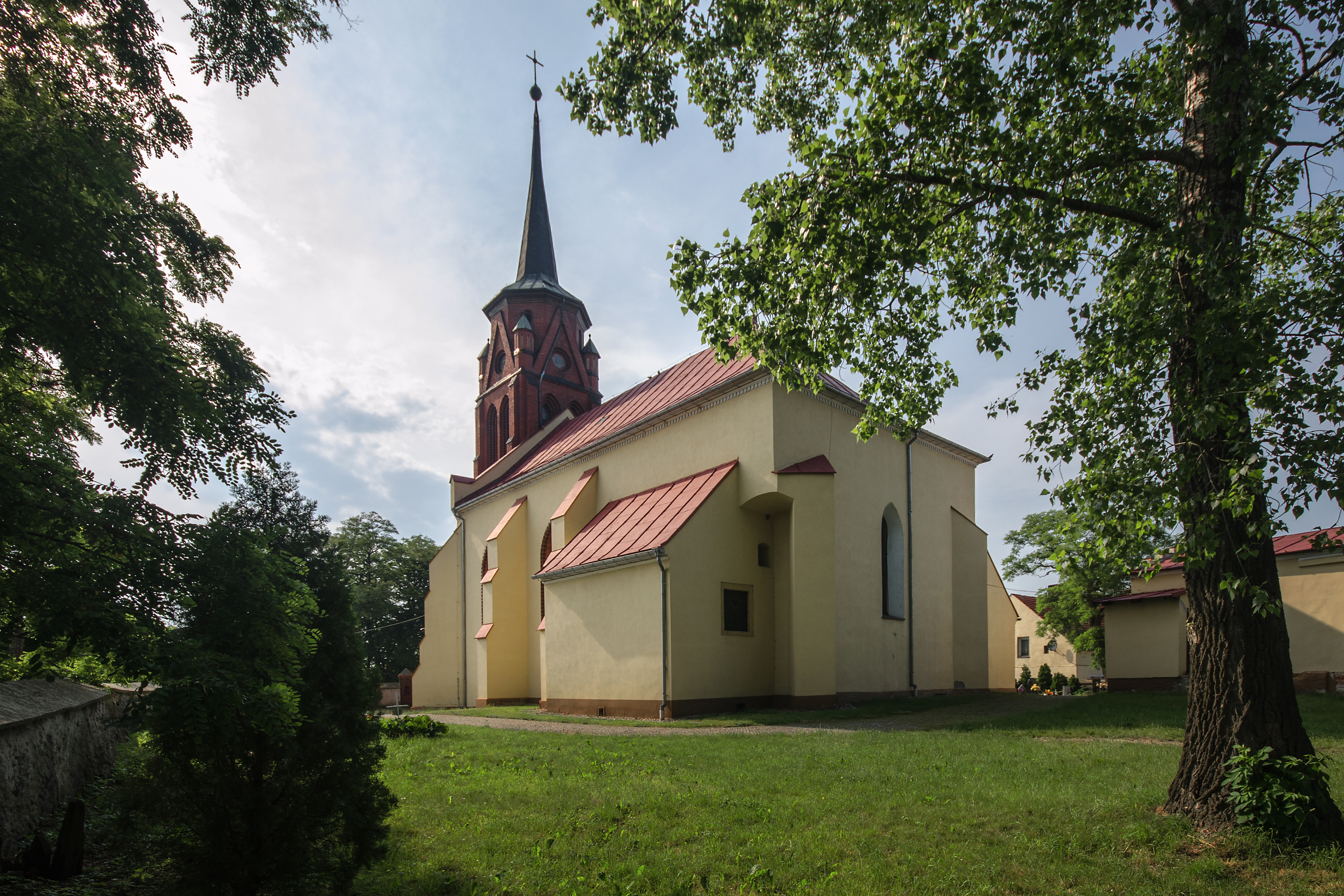
- SM Jaksonów Kościół Podwyższenia Krzyża Świętego

- Location within Poland
- Coordinates: 50°56′03″N 16°57′49″E
- Country: Poland
- Voivodeship: Lower Silesian
- County: Wrocław
- Gmina: Żórawina

Jaksonów [jakˈsɔnuf] is a village in the administrative district of Gmina Żórawina, within Wrocław County, Lower Silesian Voivodeship, in south-western Poland.

== Monuments ==
- Medieval stone cross (probably conciliation cross)
- Baroque statue of St. John of Nepomuk
