= Wegrow =

Węgrów may refer to:

- Węgrów, a town in eastern Poland in the Masovian Voivodeship
- WeGrow Store, a hydroponics franchise for medicinal marijuana

== See also ==
- Węgrów (disambiguation)
