= Racławice Małe =

- Village
- Location within Poland
- Coordinates: 50°56′N 17°6′E
- Country: Poland
- Voivodeship: Lower Silesian
- County: Wrocław
- Gmina: Żórawina

Racławice Małe [rat͡swaˈvit͡sɛ ˈmawɛ] is a village in the administrative district of Gmina Żórawina, within Wrocław County, Lower Silesian Voivodeship, in south-western Poland.
