= Galowice =

- Village
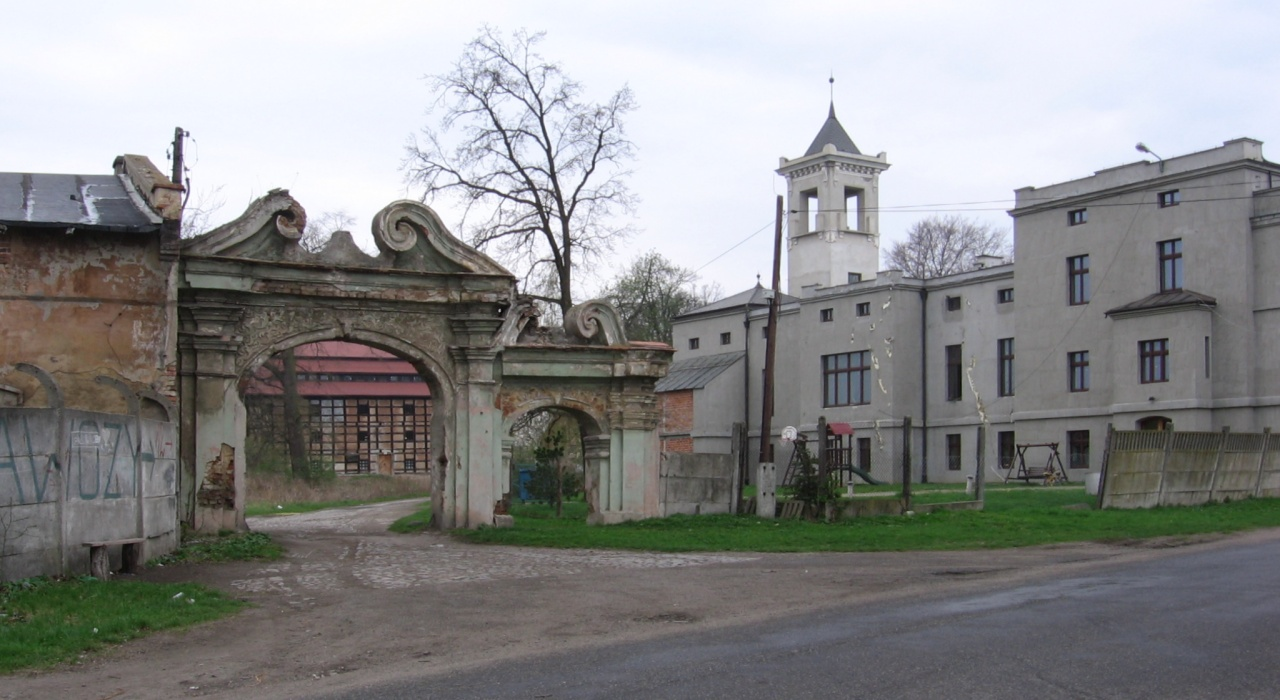
- Galowice Manor

- Location within Poland
- Coordinates: 50°58′55″N 17°00′15″E
- Country: Poland
- Voivodeship: Lower Silesian
- County: Wrocław
- Gmina: Żórawina

Galowice [ɡalɔˈvit͡sɛ] is a village in the administrative district of Gmina Żórawina, within Wrocław County, Lower Silesian Voivodeship, in south-western Poland.
