= Żórawina radio transmitter =

Coordinates: 50°59′N 17°03′E

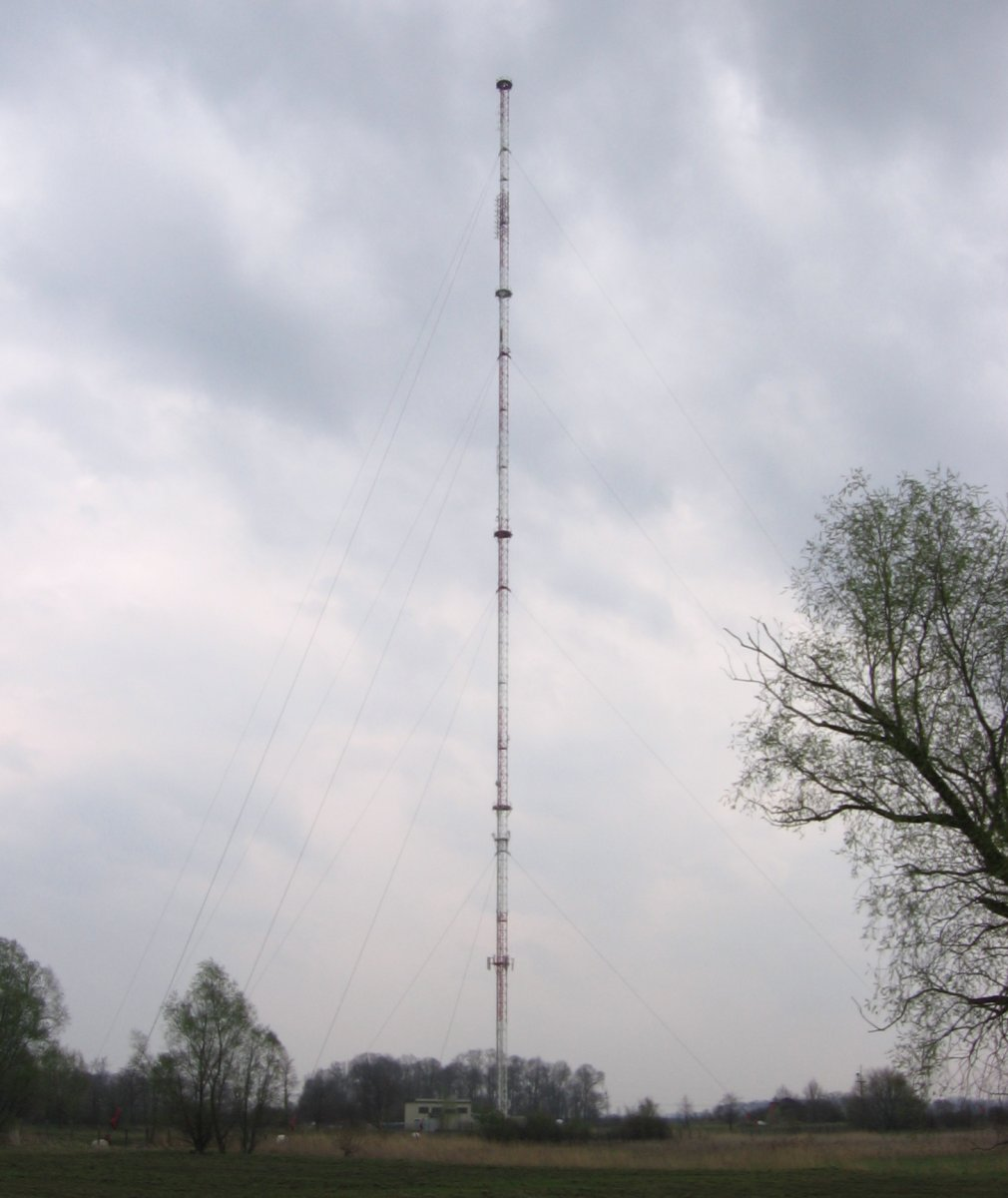
Antenna tower of transmitter Żórawina today

The Żórawina radio transmitter is a facility for FM (and previously MW) transmission at Żórawina, south of Wrocław. It was established in 1932 as "Reichssender Breslau" and used as an antenna tower. Originally it was a 140-metre-tall free-standing lattice tower built of wood, on which a wire antenna was hung up. On the top of the tower there was an octagonal ring of bronze with a diameter of 10.6 metres for electrical lengthening of the antenna.

In 1940 a second transmission aerial was built. It was an arrangement of three T-antennas mounted on three 49.9-metre-tall guyed masts, which formed a triangle with equal side length. This antenna and the wood tower were in use until the shutdown of the facility on February 7, 1945.

After 1945 transmission was resumed by the Polish Broadcasting Company using the wood tower as an antenna tower. The frequency of the transmitter was changed to 1206 kHz in 1965. In 1976 a 260-metre-tall mast radiator was built at the site, with the radiated power increased to 200 kilowatts after its completion. The wood tower remained as a backup antenna until its demolition in fall 1990. Until its own demolition, the tower was the tallest wooden structure on earth after the demolition of the wooden radio tower of Transmitter Ismaning on March 16, 1983.

In 1997 the MW transmitter was shut down. The guys of the mast, which were divided by insulators, were replaced with guys without insulators as the mast is now only used for FM- and TV-transmissions.

== Transmitted programmes ==
=== TV programmes ===
Program	Frequency	Channel Number	Transmission Power
MUX 3 DVB-T Telewizja Polska S.A.	506 MHz	25	30 kW
MUX 4 RS TV S.A.	658 MHz	44	8 kW

=== FM radio programmes ===
Program	Frequency	Transmission Power
PR1 Polskie Radio S.A.	87,70 MHz	10 kW
Radio Wrocław Polskie Radio - Regionalna Rozgłośnia we Wrocławiu "Radio Wrocław" S.A.	89,80 MHz	6 kW
Katolickie Radio Rodzina Archidiecezja Wrocławska	92 MHz	10 kW
RMF FM Radio Muzyka Fakty Sp. z o.o.	92,90 MHz	10 kW
106,1 Roxy FM Radio Klakson sp. z o.o.	106,10 MHz	10 kW
PR4 Polskie Radio S.A.	107,50 MHz	5 kW

== See also ==
- List of masts
- List of towers
