= Suchy Dwór, Lower Silesian Voivodeship =

Suchy Dwór
- Village
- Location within Poland
- Coordinates: 51°01′08″N 17°02′09″E
- Country: Poland
- Voivodeship: Lower Silesian
- County: Wrocław
- Gmina: Żórawina

Suchy Dwór [ˈsuxɨ ˈdvur] is a village in the administrative district of Gmina Żórawina, within Wrocław County, Lower Silesian Voivodeship, in south-western Poland.
