= Wojkowice, Lower Silesian Voivodeship =

Wojkowice
- Village
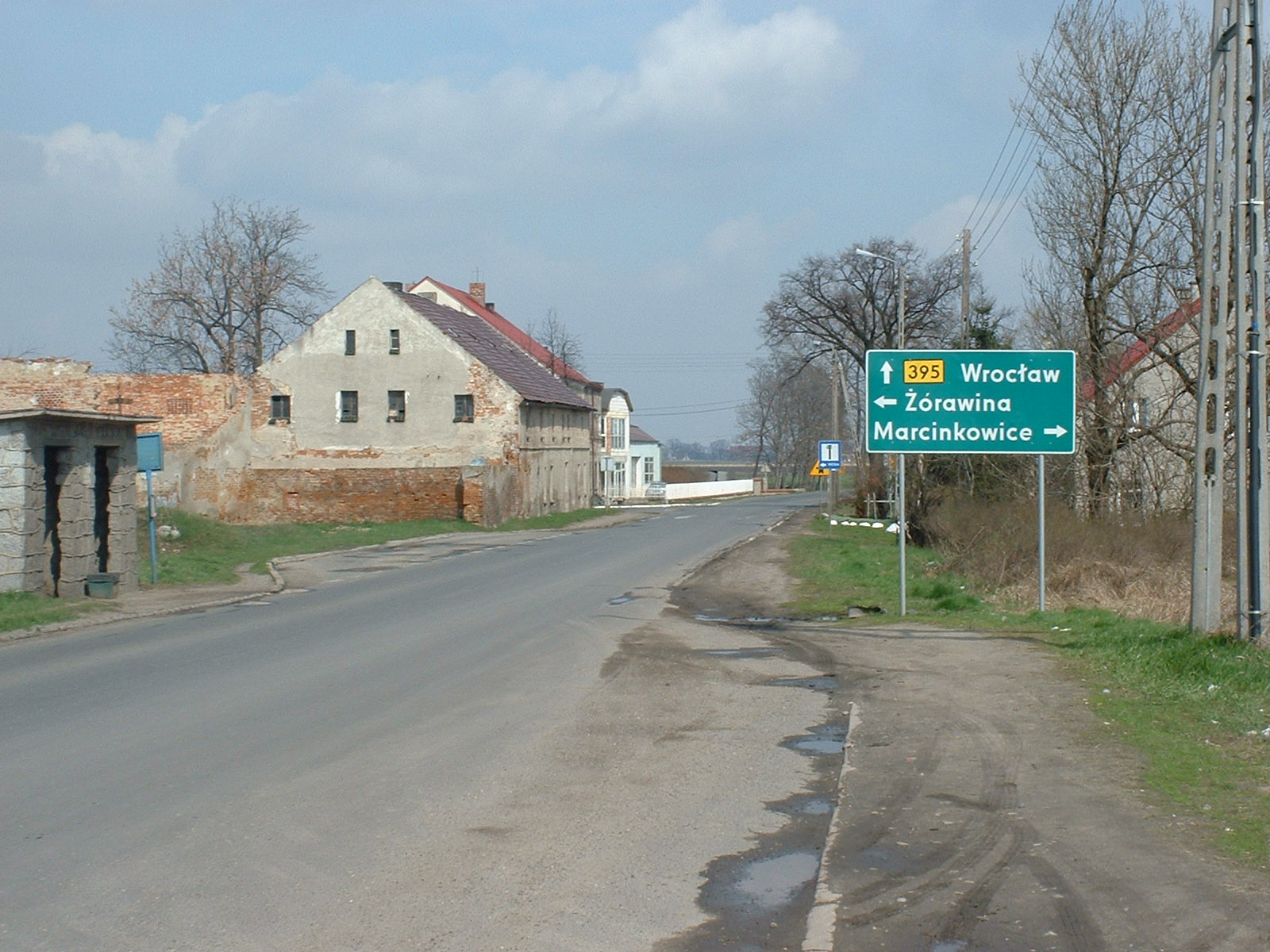

- Location within Poland
- Coordinates: 50°58′50″N 17°4′6″E
- Country: Poland
- Voivodeship: Lower Silesian
- County: Wrocław
- Gmina: Żórawina
- Postal code: 55-020

Wojkowice [vɔi̯kɔˈvit͡sɛ] is a village in the administrative district of Gmina Żórawina, within Wrocław County, Lower Silesian Voivodeship, in south-western Poland.
