= Komorowice, Wrocław County =

Komorowice
- Village
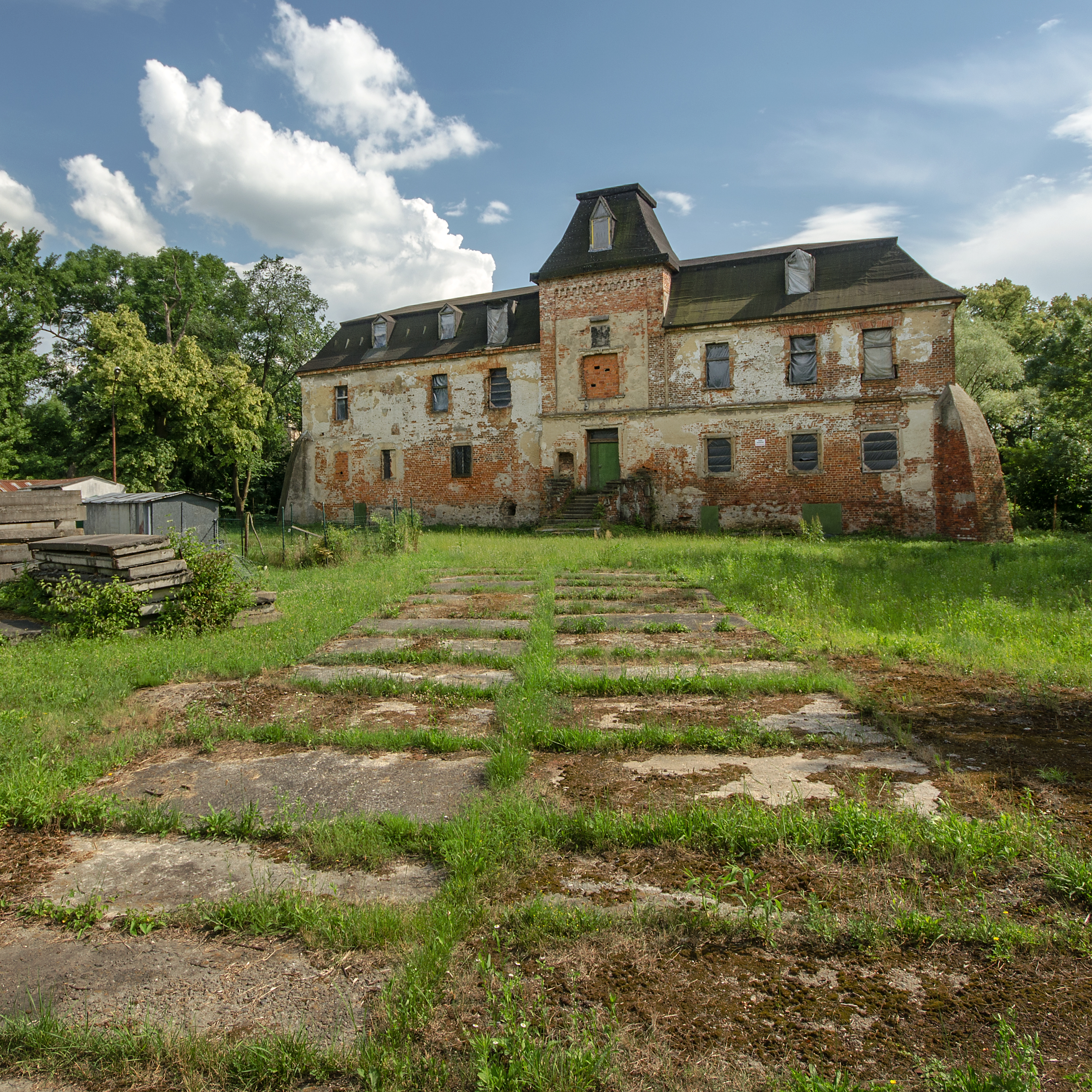
- SM Komorowice pałac

- Location within Poland
- Coordinates: 51°0′49″N 16°59′56″E
- Country: Poland
- Voivodeship: Lower Silesian
- County: Wrocław
- Gmina: Żórawina

Komorowice [kɔmɔrɔˈvit͡sɛ] is a village in the administrative district of Gmina Żórawina, within Wrocław County, Lower Silesian Voivodeship, in south-western Poland.
