= Mędłów =

- Village
- Location within Poland
- Coordinates: 51°0′13″N 17°2′53″E
- Country: Poland
- Voivodeship: Lower Silesian
- County: Wrocław
- Gmina: Żórawina
- Website: http://medlow.pl

Mędłów [ˈmɛndwuf] is a village in the administrative district of Gmina Żórawina, within Wrocław County, Lower Silesian Voivodeship, in south-western Poland.
