= Brzeście, Lower Silesian Voivodeship =

Brzeście
- Village
- Location within Poland
- Coordinates: 50°55′38″N 16°59′36″E
- Country: Poland
- Voivodeship: Lower Silesian
- County: Wrocław
- Gmina: Żórawina

Brzeście [ˈbʐɛɕt͡ɕɛ] is a village in the administrative district of Gmina Żórawina, within Wrocław County, Lower Silesian Voivodeship, in south-western Poland.
