= Bogunów =

- Village
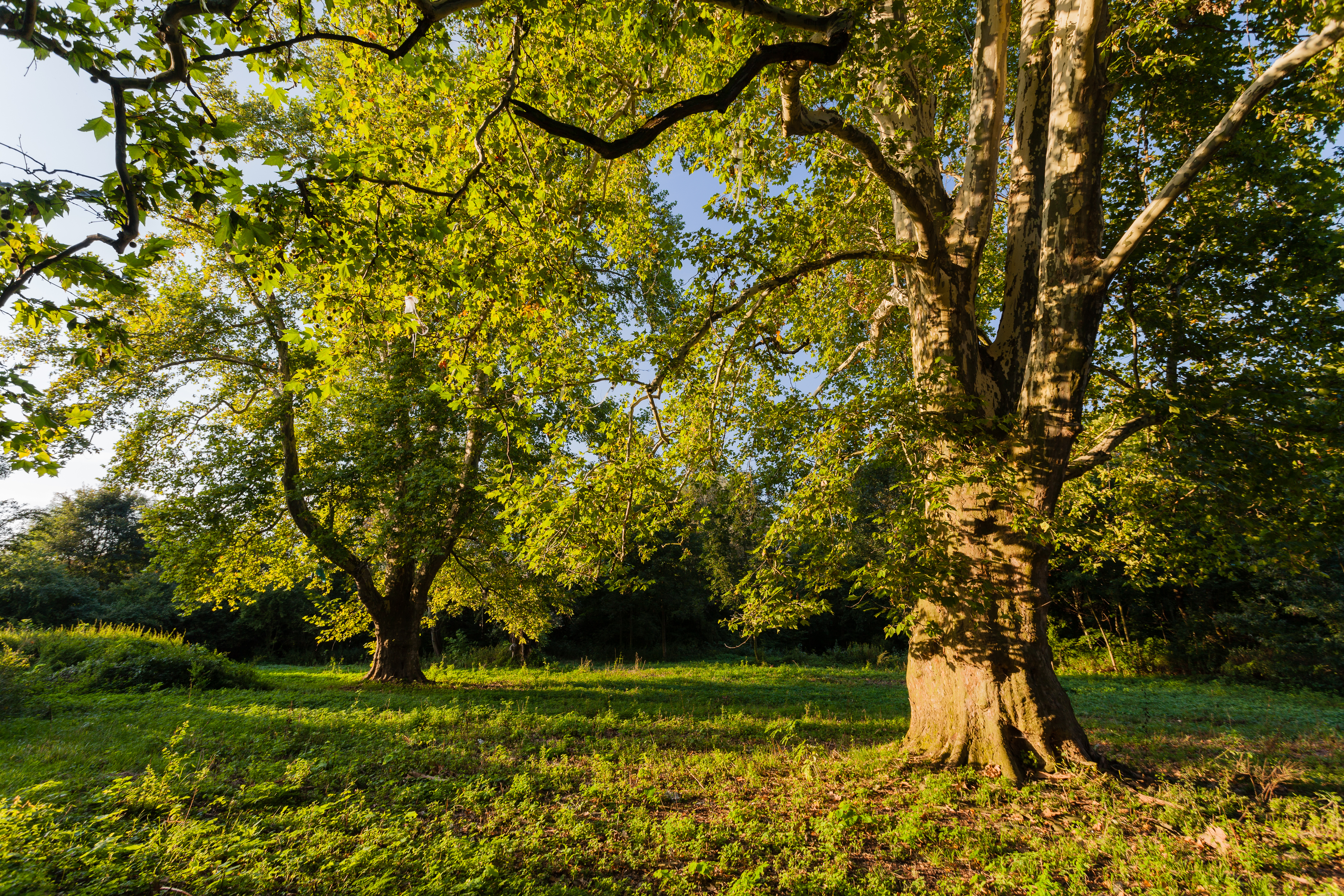

- Location within Poland
- Coordinates: 50°56′38″N 17°01′08″E
- Country: Poland
- Voivodeship: Lower Silesian
- County: Wrocław
- Gmina: Żórawina

Bogunów [bɔˈɡunuf] is a village in the administrative district of Gmina Żórawina, within Wrocław County, Lower Silesian Voivodeship, in south-western Poland.

== Monuments ==
- Medieval stone cross (probably conciliation cross)
