= Żórawina =

- Village
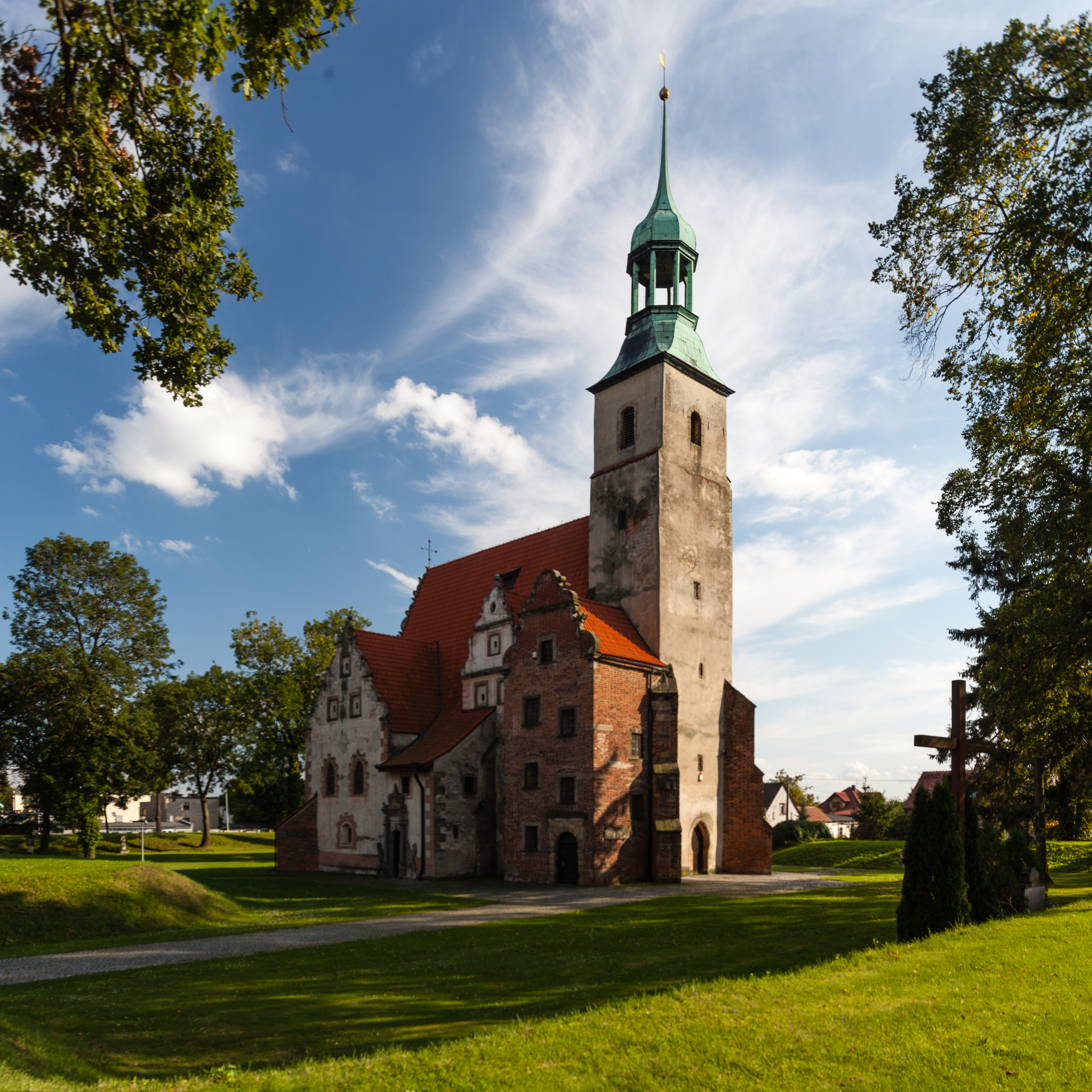
- Fortified Holy Trinity Church

- Coat of arms

- Location within Poland
- Coordinates: 50°59′N 17°03′E
- Country: Poland
- Voivodeship: Lower Silesian
- County: Wrocław
- Gmina: Żórawina
- Population: 1,700
- Time zone: UTC+1 (CET)
  - Summer (DST): UTC+2 (CEST)
- Vehicle registration: DWR

Żórawina ([ʐuraˈvina]: German: Rothsürben, 1937–1947: Rothbach) is a village (former town) in Wrocław County, Lower Silesian Voivodeship, in south-western Poland. It is the seat of the administrative district (gmina) called Gmina Żórawina.

Żórawina is the site of one of Poland's tallest radio masts, the Żórawina radio transmitter.

There is a mass grave of 27 Polish, French, and Belgian prisoners of war murdered by the Germans in the village during World War II.

The name of the village is of Polish origin and comes from the word żuraw 'crane'.

== Transport ==
There is a train station in Żórawina, and the A4 motorway runs just east of the village.

== Sports ==
The local football club is KS Żórawina. It competes in the lower leagues.
