= Przecławice, Wrocław County =

Przecławice
- Village
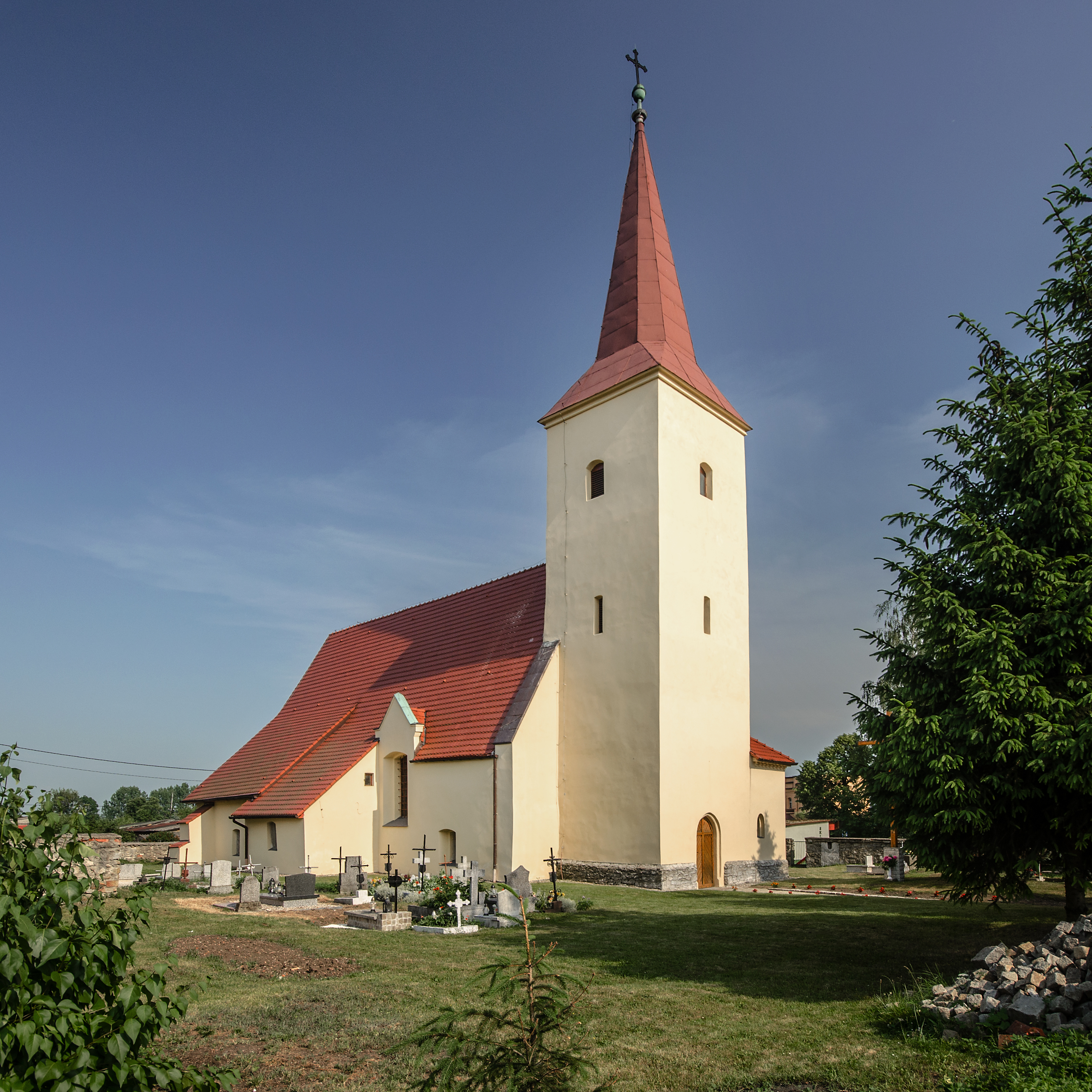
- Church of Saint Catherine

- Location within Poland
- Coordinates: 50°56′N 16°58′E
- Country: Poland
- Voivodeship: Lower Silesian
- County: Wrocław
- Gmina: Żórawina

Przecławice [pʂɛt͡swaˈvit͡sɛ] is a village in the administrative district of Gmina Żórawina, within Wrocław County, Lower Silesian Voivodeship, in south-western Poland.

== Monuments ==
- 3 medieval stone crosses (probably conciliation crosses)
