= Turów, Wrocław County =

Turów
- Village
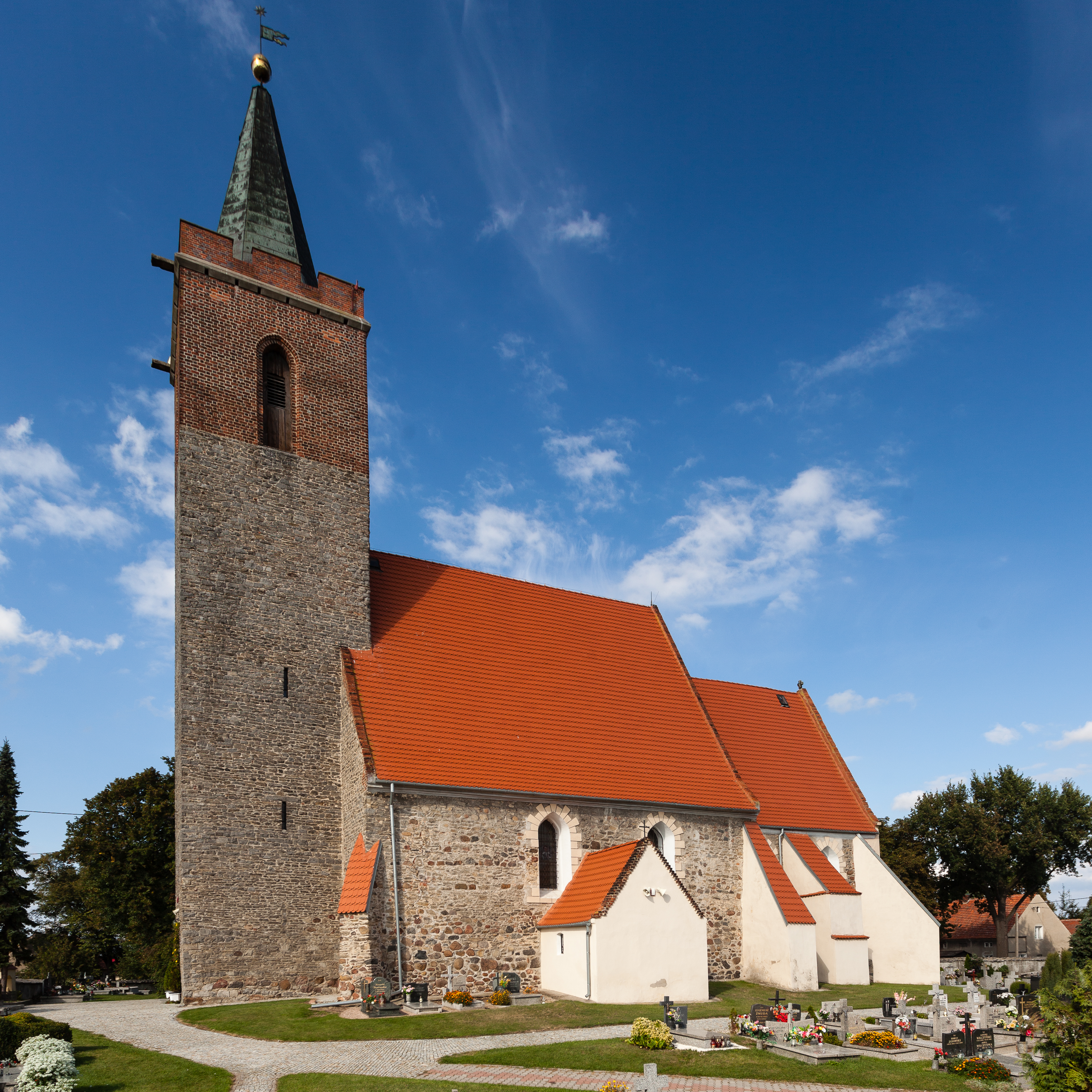
- Church of the Nativity of the Virgin Mary in Turów

- Location within Poland
- Coordinates: 50°59′44″N 17°3′56″E
- Country: Poland
- Voivodeship: Lower Silesian
- County: Wrocław
- Gmina: Żórawina
- Time zone: UTC+1 (CET)
  - Summer (DST): UTC+2 (CEST)
- Vehicle registration: DWR
- Primary airport: Copernicus Airport Wrocław

Turów [ˈturuf] is a village in the administrative district of Gmina Żórawina, within Wrocław County, Lower Silesian Voivodeship, in south-western Poland.

The name of the village is of Polish origin and comes from the word tur, which means "aurochs".
