= Jarosławice, Lower Silesian Voivodeship =

Jarosławice
- Village
- Location within Poland
- Coordinates: 50°58′21″N 17°09′04″E
- Country: Poland
- Voivodeship: Lower Silesian
- County: Wrocław
- Gmina: Żórawina

Jarosławice [jarɔswaˈvit͡sɛ] is a village in the administrative district of Gmina Żórawina, within Wrocław County, Lower Silesian Voivodeship, in south-western Poland.
