= Żerniki Wielkie =

- Village
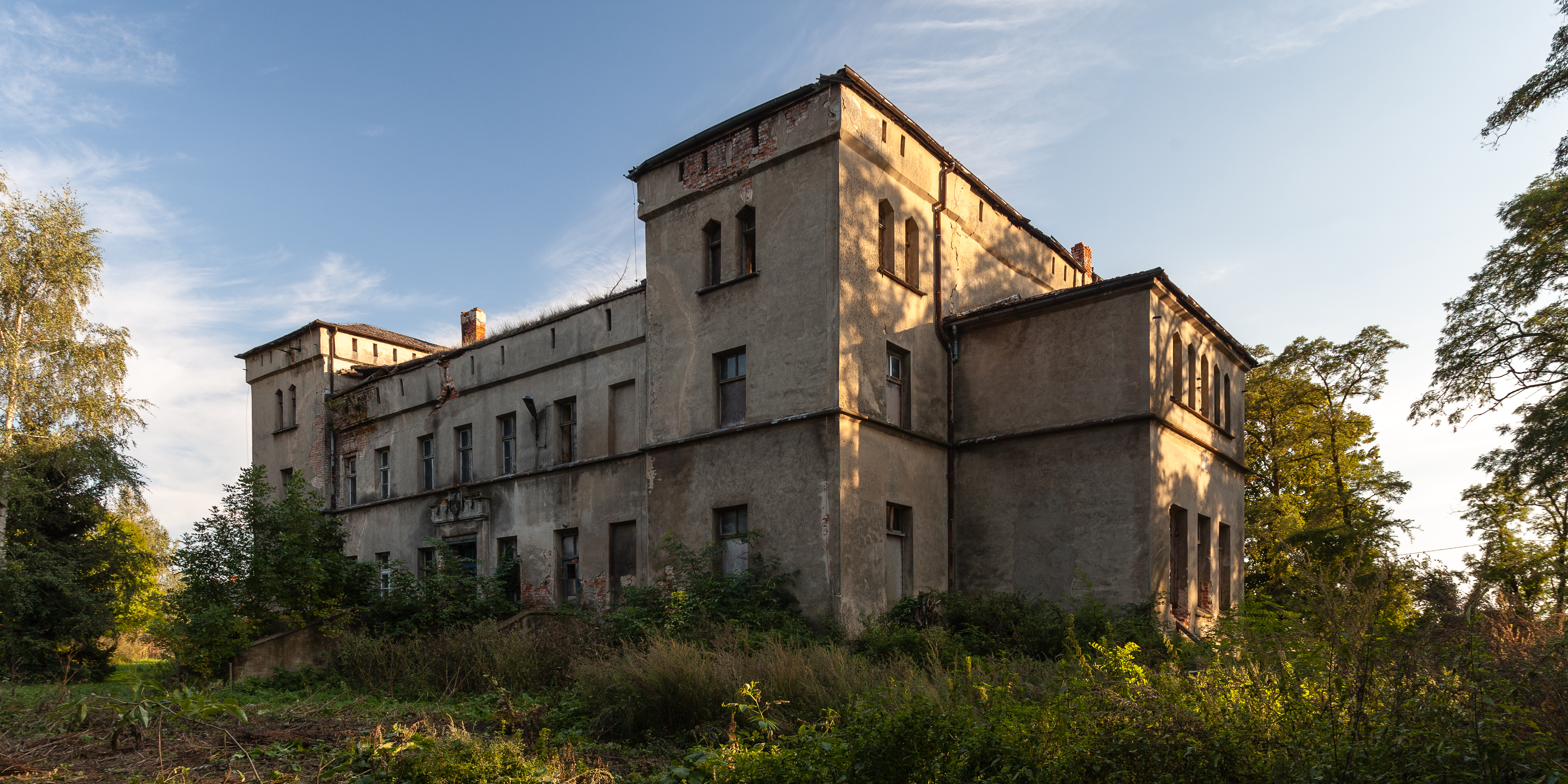
- Manor in the village

- Location within Poland
- Coordinates: 50°57′35″N 17°1′36″E
- Country: Poland
- Voivodeship: Lower Silesian
- County: Wrocław
- Gmina: Żórawina
- Time zone: UTC+1 (CET)
  - Summer (DST): UTC+2 (CEST)
- Vehicle registration: DWR

Żerniki Wielkie (Polish pronunciation: [ʐɛrˈɲikʲi ˈvjɛlkʲɛ]) is a village in the administrative district of Gmina Żórawina, within Wrocław County, Lower Silesian Voivodeship, in south-western Poland.
