= Węgry, Lower Silesian Voivodeship =

Węgry
- Village
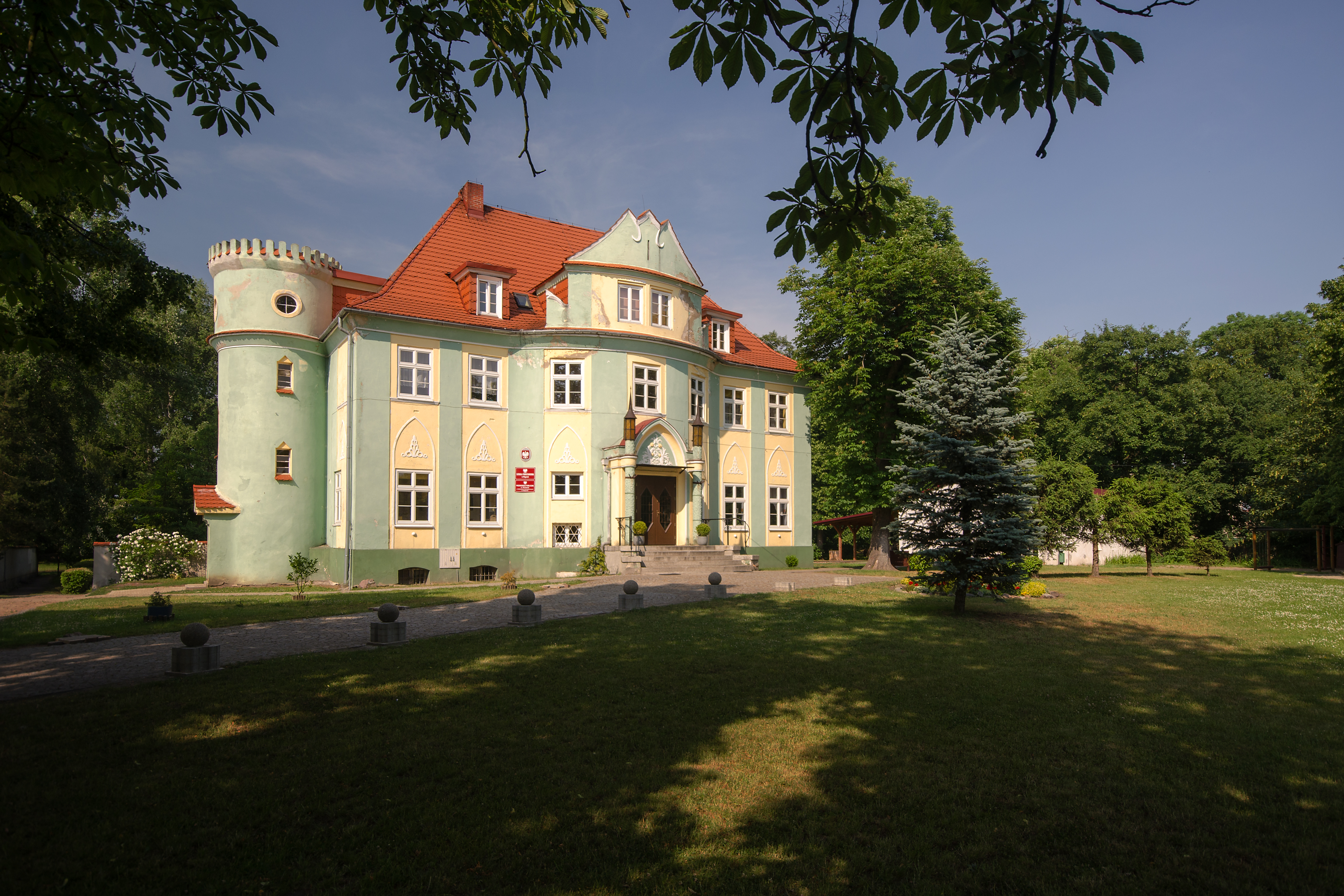
- Manor

- Location within Poland
- Coordinates: 50°56′N 17°03′E
- Country: Poland
- Voivodeship: Lower Silesian
- County: Wrocław
- Gmina: Żórawina

Węgry [ˈvɛŋɡrɨ] is a village in the administrative district of Gmina Żórawina, within Wrocław County, Lower Silesian Voivodeship, in south-western Poland. It is named after Hungary.
