= Milejowice, Lower Silesian Voivodeship =

Milejowice
- Village
- Location within Poland
- Coordinates: 50°57′47″N 17°05′25″E
- Country: Poland
- Voivodeship: Lower Silesian
- County: Wrocław
- Gmina: Żórawina

Milejowice [milɛjɔˈvit͡sɛ] is a village in the administrative district of Gmina Żórawina, within Wrocław County, Lower Silesian Voivodeship, in south-western Poland.
