= Mnichowice, Lower Silesian Voivodeship =

Mnichowice
- Village
- Location within Poland
- Coordinates: 50°58′53″N 17°5′19″E
- Country: Poland
- Voivodeship: Lower Silesian
- County: Wrocław
- Gmina: Żórawina

Mnichowice [mnixɔˈvit͡sɛ] is a village in the administrative district of Gmina Żórawina, within Wrocław County, Lower Silesian Voivodeship, in south-western Poland.
