= Nicholas Henel =

German Renaissance humanist

doctor of both laws Nicolaus Henel von Hennenfeld
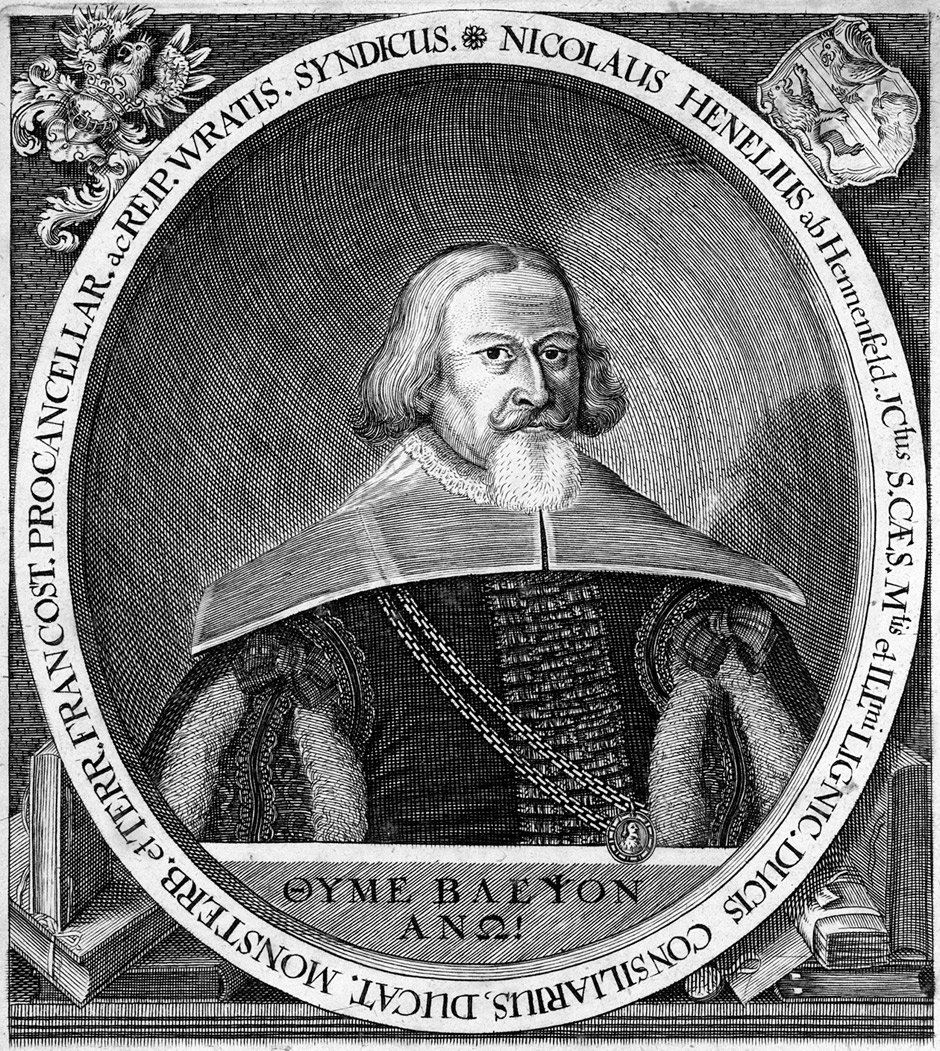
- Chalcography of Nicholas Henel (c. 1642) by Wolfgang Hartmann
- Born: Nicholas Henel; January 11, 1582; Prudnik, Duchy of Opole and Racibórz, Bohemian Crown, Holy Roman Empire
- Died: 23 July 1656 (aged 74); Wrocław, Bohemian Crown, Holy Roman Empire
- Other name: Nicholas Henel of Prudnik
- Occupations: regionalist; receiver; biographer; chronicler
- Spouse: Kunigunde Jessinsky von Groß-Jessen
- Parent(s): Stephan Henel; Anna Kühne

Academic background
- Influences: Caspar Neandr

Academic work
- Era: German Renaissance; 17th-century philosophy
- Main interests: History; Protestantism
- Notable works: Silesiographia; Silesia Togata; Breslographia

Ecclesiastical career
- Religion: Calvinism
- Church: Protestantism

Nicholas Henel (Nicolaus Henel von Hennenfeld, Nicholas Henel of Prudnik; 11 January 1582 – 23 July 1656) was a Silesian historian, receiver, biographer and a chronicler. He's considered to be the most outstanding representative of Renaissance's historiography of Silesia.

== Life ==
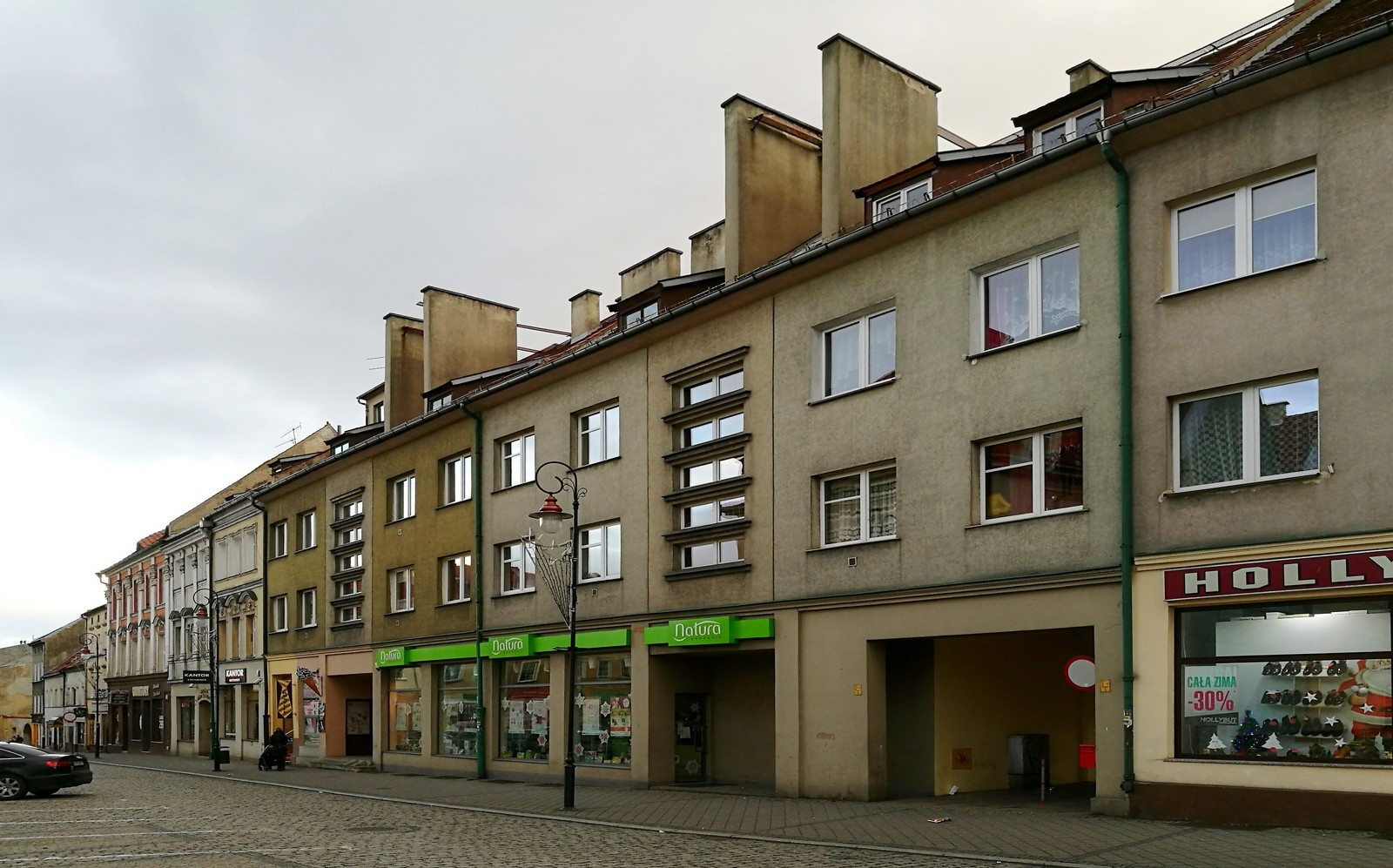
Southern part of the Market Square in Prudnik, where Henel's house was located

Nicholas Henel was born on 11 January 1582 in Prudnik, in the Duchy of Opole and Racibórz. He came from a noble family. His father, Stephan Henel (1546–1602), was a local preacher in Prudnik, and later became a pastor of the Evangelic church in nearby Rudziczka. His mother, Anna Kühne (?–1596), was a daughter of a secretary of Prudnik. Their house was located on the southern part of the Market Square in Prudnik.

He started his education in a classic gymnasium in Prudnik, where he was a favourite student of Caspar Neander. Henel later noted that thanks to Neander he became interested in Greek language, Latin and poetry. After Neander left Prudnik and moved to Kłodzko, Henel moved to a school in Opava. Since 1596 he studied at the Saint Elisabeth Gymnasium in Wrocław. He was sick for most of 1598, and in 1599 the gymnasium was closed down because of a plague. Then Henel's father recommended him going to a Leipzig University.

On Easter 1600, Henel met the merchant Heinrich Holzgraf, who was on his way to the fair in Leipzig. During a conversation with him, he learned that Holzgraf had board and lodging in Leipzig, and he knew several students from the local university. Students met by Holzgraf, including Siegmund Niebelschütz, advised Henel to start medical studies in Jena. Upon his arrival in Jena, Henel met Matthias Bilitzer von Bilitz from Prudnik. At his instigation, he gave up medicine and started studying law. At that time, lectures on law were conducted by Nicolaus Reusner from Lwówek Śląski.

Henel stopped his studies and returned to Prudnik in 1602 due to the death of his father. Due to family matters, he stayed at home for about 9 months. During his stay in Prudnik, he thought about continuing his studies and sought help from his friends on this matter. He considered returning to studies no longer in Jena but in Frankfurt (Oder) due to its location closer to Prudnik. Meanwhile, in 1604 the scholar Daniel Rindfleisch (also called Daniel Bucretius) from Wrocław recommended Henel to Nicolaus Rehdiger from the family of Nikolaus I Rüdiger, who lived in Strzeszów, as a tutor and teacher of the adolescent sons Ernst Friedrich and Wilhelm. Rehdiger was a widower himself and raised two sons and four daughters. For this reason, he took Henel as his guardian with great relief. Rehdiger quickly took a liking to Henel and treated him like a son, often having scientific disputes with each other. He had a library at home, which Henel often used. He believed that he was learning more in this way than in college. He did not accept the position of the rector of the new gymnasium in Prudnik, proposed to him in 1608, because the vision of teaching work was of little interest to him in view of Rehdiger's plans to send children on a journey through the richest countries in Western Europe. Henel made this nearly three-year journey with them.

He was preparing to defend his doctorate at the Faculty of Law of the University of Orleans, Kingdom of France. Of particular importance to him was that the Protestant theologian John Calvin used to study there in the past. He successfully defended his doctorate on 4 September 1610. From then on, in the works of Henel, next to his surname, he put three letters U. I. D. (triusque iuris doctor), denoting a doctor of both laws, i.e. canon and Roman. Due to his place of birth, he often wrote the term "Prudnik" in Latin, Neostad. Siles., in front of these letters.

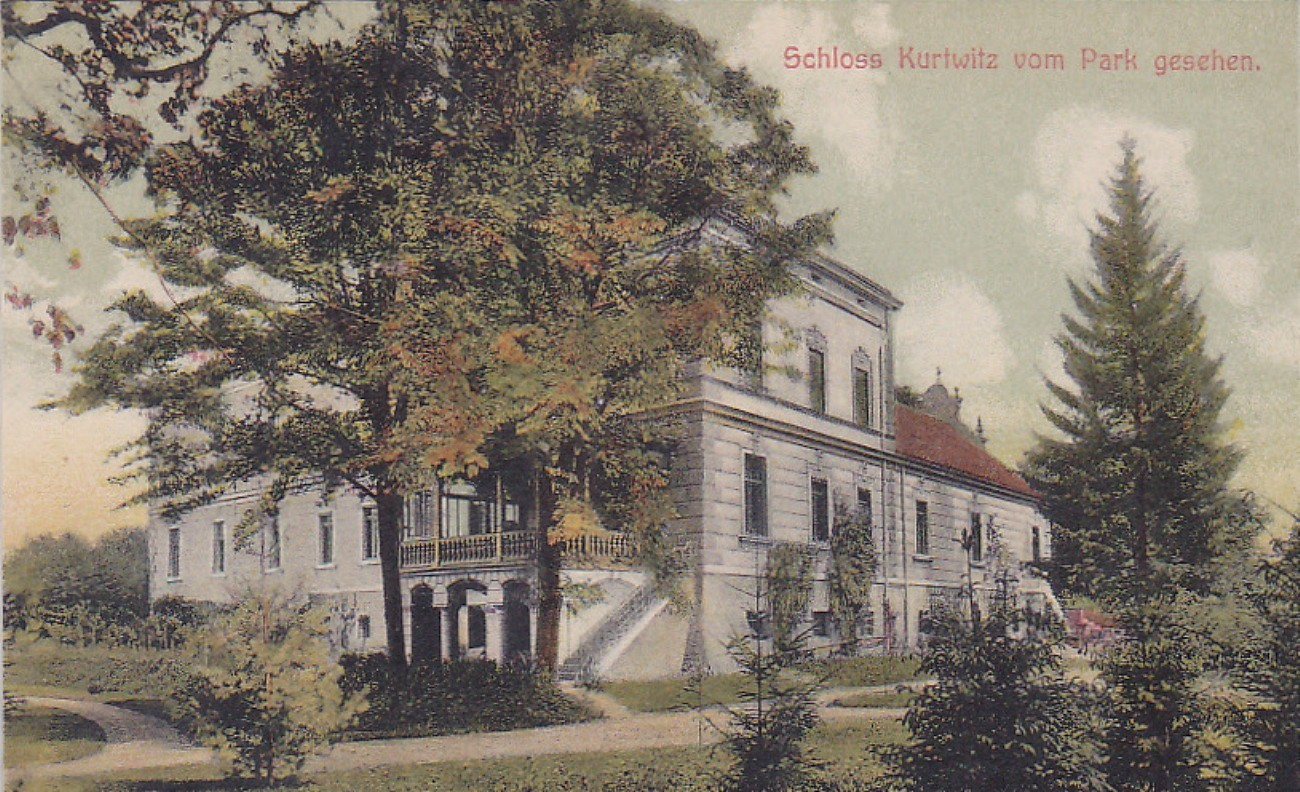
Palace in Kondratowice (Kurtwitz)

After paying homage to Matthias of Austria by the Silesian and Lusatian states in 1611, Henel was entered on the list of candidates for the position of counselor at the royal court of appeal in Prague. He spent almost the entire next year writing Silesiographia and Breslographia. In 1613, he moved to the Salt Market in Wrocław and began practicing as an attorney in Prudnik. He devoted his free time to writing epigrams. In the summer of 1618, he accepted the proposal of Baron Nicolaus von Burghaus, the imperial president of Lower and Upper Silesia, and the governor of the Duchy of Ziębice and the city of Ząbkowice Śląskie, for the position of a land writer in the Duchy of Ziębice and a receiver of Ząbkowice Śląskie with a salary of 300 thalers. After the death of Nicolaus von Burghaus, at the request of his son, Henel prepared a funeral speech for him, Burghausiomnema, hoc est laudatio posthuma Dr. Nicolai Lib. Baronis de Burghaus. Siegmund von Bock became the new governor of the Duchy of Ziębice and became friends with Henel. Soon Nicholas bought a house in Ząbkowice Śląskie and married a wealthy woman from Wrocław, Anna Partisch. From 1629, Henel was discouraged from living in converts to Catholicism in Ząbkowice Śląskie and in 1632 he returned with his family to Wrocław, where the dominant religion was Lutheranism. He became a councilor in the Duchy of Legnica, Brzeg and Wołów. In 1639, as chancellor, he became a receiver in Wrocław. He also served as a proto-syndicist for some time. It was a higher position than the trustee, it functioned periodically when the city needed two receivers. Syndics supervised the work of city writers and agreed on the content of various contracts concluded by the city, even with the emperor. Henel maintained the position of receiver until his death. In 1642, he additionally became a member of the imperial council of the Ząbkowice District. For his merits on May 30, 1642, he became a hereditary Czech nobleman with the family name of von Hennenfeld (Nicolaus Henel von Hennenfeld).

Thanks to his functions, he got rich quickly. In 1651 he became the owner of the Kurtwitz estate (near Niemcza), and then the Strzelin estates of Olbendorf and Grünheide. On 22 September 1653, he was awarded the title of court palatine. While performing this function, he could appreciate the merits of Eliasz Maior (died 1706), co-head of the school and professor of the Elizabethan gymnasium in Wrocław.

Mikołaj Henel was often sick. Usually he was treated by doctor Paul Höpfner, from his native Prudnik. After Höpfner's death, Henel published an elogium devoted to him in Silesia Togata. He wrote two wills, the first in 1645 and the second in 1651. He died on 23 July 1656 in Wrocław. After Henel's death, his friends published a collection of Latin and German poems dedicated to him.

== Family ==
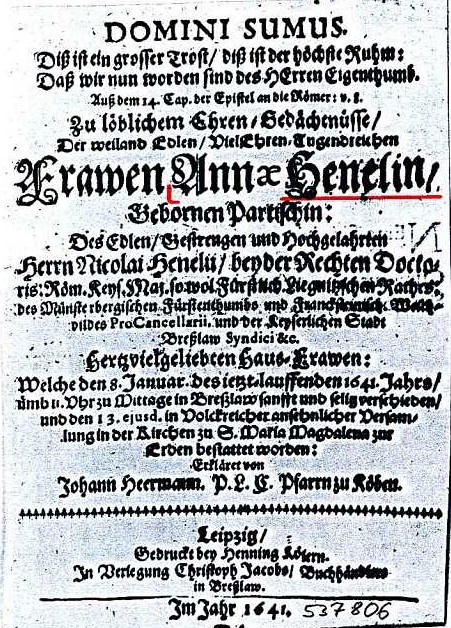
Title of the funeral sermon for Anna Henel's death (1641)

Henel was married twice. The first wife was Anna Partisch (also spelled Bartsch) (died January 8, 1641), the daughter of Martin, a Wrocław beer tax collector for the Emperor, and Magdalena Pförtner von der Hölle. The marriage was concluded on 8 October 1619. The second wife, since 14 July 1643, was Kunigunde Jessinsky (Jassensky) von Groß-Jessen, daughter of Esaias and Magdalena von Hertwig. As an orphan, she was the stepdaughter of the mayor of Wrocław, Stanislau Aichhäuser von Leonhardwitz, who took her under his protection as his wife's niece, after the death of his own children.

Nicolai Heneli had one son, Christian Frederick, born in 1621. This son, married to Joanna von Pein, had two daughters and a son, Jan Christian, who died at the age of two, and the family died in 1682.

== Works ==
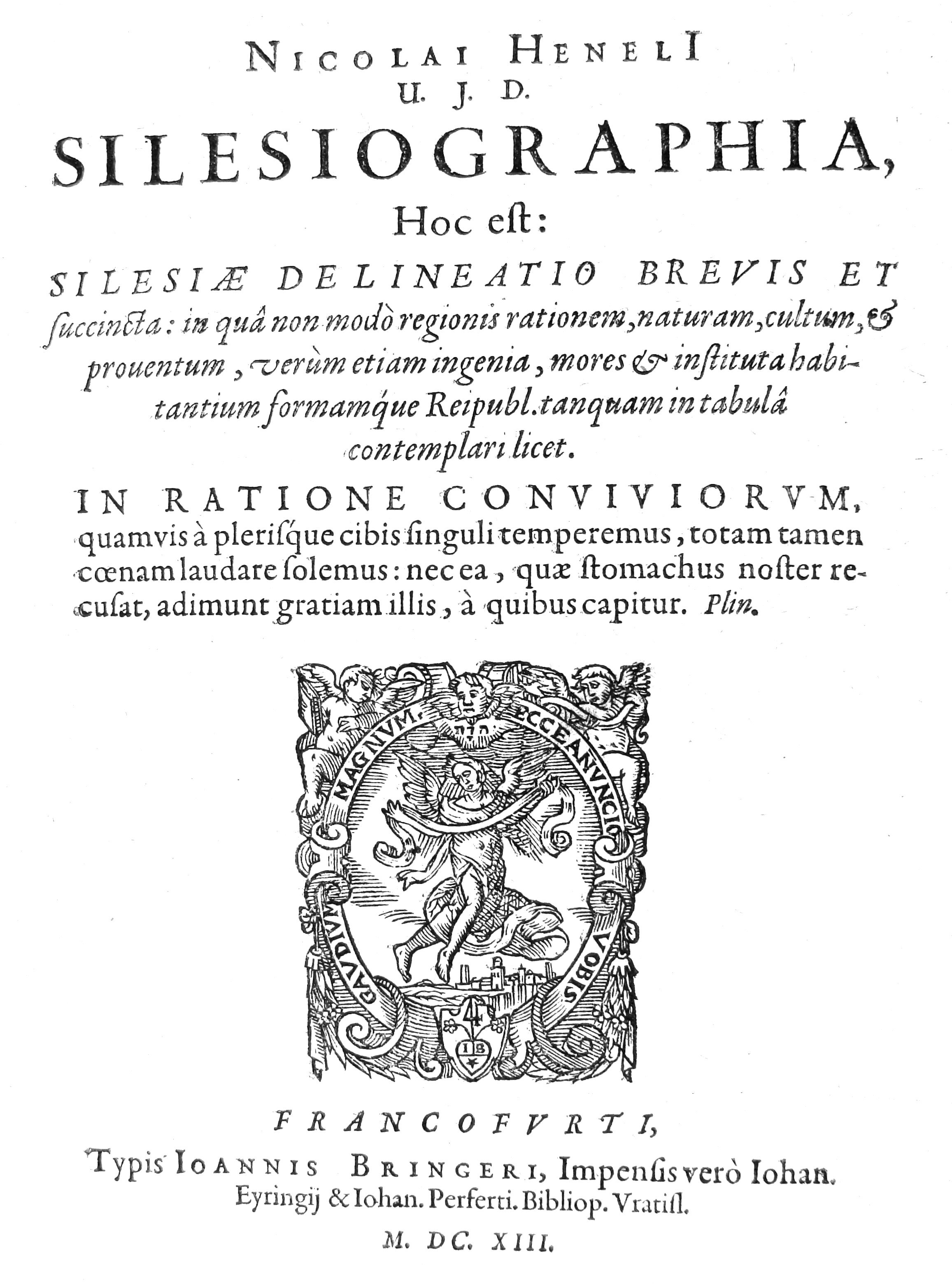
Silesiographia (1613)

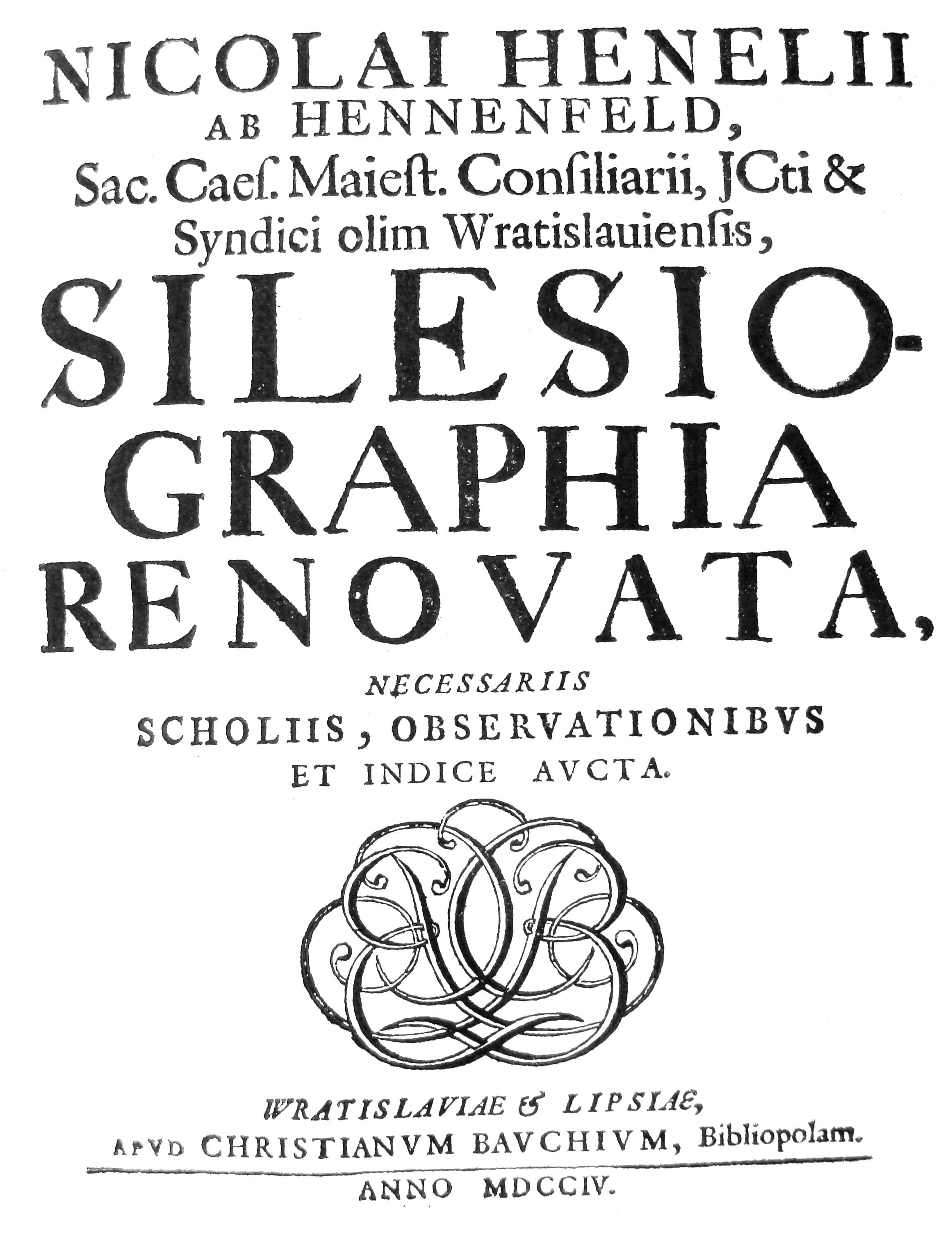
Silesiographia renova (1704)

Henel's greatest fame was provided by his works on Silesia. He wrote them in Latin and only later translated them, mainly into German.

- Silesiographia and Breslographia (1613) a compendium of knowledge about Silesia and its capital Wrocław. There he discusses the origin of names, geographic division, nature, natural resources, history, rulers, political system, cities, etc.
- Silesia Togata - containing biographies of about 600 Silesian humanists and scientists.

After the death of Henelius, in 1704, the prelate Michael Joseph Fibiger collected his works, significantly supplemented them and published them in Leipzig and Wrocław at Christian Bauch, owner of the publishing house (bookstore) Bibliopolam under the title Silesiographia renovata necessariis scholiis, observationibus et indice aucta - the whole consists of 3 parts in 2 volumes. This edition, ending the times of humanism, has gone down in history as the first collective scientific publication about Silesia.

The manuscripts collected by Henel also published:

- Annales Silesiae (Leipzig 1730) - a Silesian chronicle until 1612, based on church documents and the Wrocław archives.
- Chronico Ducatus Monsterbergensis et Territorii Francosteinensis (in Silesiacarum rerum Scriptores - Leipzig 1730), describing the political activity of Silesian princes from Bolko I to the end of the reign of Maximilian II (1576).

=== Digitized ===
- Breslo-graphia
- Silesiographia Renovata, p. 1
- Silesiographia Renovata, p. 2
