= Walter von Pückler =

German anti-Semitic activist (1860–1924)

- Born: 9 October 1860; Rogau, Silesia, Prussia
- Died: 23 August 1924 (aged 63); Breslau, Lower Silesia, Prussia
- Other names: Dreschgraf; Judenschläger (Jew-basher)
- Education: University of Heidelberg
- Spouse: Luise von Zastrow (div. 1903)

Count Albrecht Erdmann Walter von Pückler-Muskau (9 October 1860 – 23 August 1924), also known by the nickname Dreschgraf (lit. 'the thrashing count'), was a German lawyer and antisemitic agitator. He has been referred to as a "portent of the Holocaust".

== Biography ==
Walter von Pückler was born into a distinguished noble family on 9 October 1860, in Rogau, near Breslau. It was not until he was 22 that he passed the Abitur and in 1887 he passed the Referendarexamen. That same year, he graduated from the University of Heidelberg with a doctorate in law. He was appointed referendar, but soon left the public service. In 1894 he inherited the Klein-Tschirne manor.

From 1899 onwards, Pückler gained notoriety for his involvement in the antisemitic movement, delivering speeches that were marked by their extreme vulgarity. In all of his addresses, mostly delivered in Berlin, he advocated violent measures against Jews, such as breaking into their stores, plundering, whipping, driving them from their homes, and killing them. From his constant use of phrases like "beat the Jews", "crack their skulls," and "thrash them", he earned the nickname Dreschgraf (lit. 'the thrashing count').

He saw himself as the legitimate successor of Stöcker and Ahlwardt, though the former criticized him for his violence and vulgarity. Antisemitic journals, especially Wilhelm Bruhn's Staatsbürgerzeitung, which published his speeches, hailed him as an ally, though some of them rejected his calls to violence. His high social position protected him for a long time from serious prosecution, though he was occasionally tried for inciting to violence. His claim before the court of Glogau on 12 May 1899, that his expressions were figurative and not meant to harm Jews, was accepted as a valid defence.

As Pückler's agitation became increasingly directed against other members of the higher nobility, whom he branded as verjudet (lit. 'Judaized'), this leniency dwindled. On 12 January 1905, a Berlin court sentenced Pückler to six months' imprisonment. He objected to one of the judges, Simonson, on account of his Jewish ancestry, but the objection was not upheld. His argument that he had been acquitted previously when he used harsher language was not considered valid. After being sentenced, he challenged the presiding judge to a duel, for which he was sentenced to three additional days in prison for contempt of court. Dr. Neumann, an expert in psychiatry, testified before the court that Pückler was mentally unstable and should be sent to an asylum for the insane. Pückler then challenged Neumann to a duel and was sentenced to two months in the fortress of Weichselmünde. He then published a paper titled Der Retter aus der Judennot, the first issue of which was seized by the police.

Pückler claimed that he was acting on the instructions of Jesus Christ himself, and he attracted a small but devoted following. However, he failed to gain the support of the working classes or the aristocracy. He died in obscurity in Breslau on 23 August 1924. Despite his lack of contributions to the ideology of antisemitism, his radicalizing influence was recognized by Julius Streicher's journal, Der Stürmer, which celebrated him as a great National Socialist before the party existed.
