= Okulice =

Okulice may refer to the following places in Poland:

- Okulice, Lower Silesian Voivodeship (south-west Poland)
- Okulice, Lesser Poland Voivodeship (south Poland)
