= Sulistrowice =

Sulistrowice may refer to the following places in Poland:

- Sulistrowice, Lower Silesian Voivodeship (south-west Poland)
- Sulistrowice, Masovian Voivodeship (east-central Poland)
