= Marxdorf =

Marxdorf may refer to:

== Places ==
Germany

- Marxdorf (Uebigau-Wahrenbrück), a village of Uebigau-Wahrenbrück municipality, Elbe-Elster, Brandenburg
- Marxdorf (Vierlinden), a village of Vierlinden municipality, Märkisch-Oderland, Brandenburg
- Marxdorf (Schashagen), a village of Schashagen municipality, Ostholstein, Schleswig-Holstein

Poland

- Garncarsko (German: Marxdorf), a village of Sobótka municipality, Wrocław County, Lower Silesian Voivodeship

== Other ==
- Marxdorfer Wolfshund, a German Wolf-dog hybrids named after Marxdorf (Uebigau-Wahrenbrück)

== See also ==
- Maxdorf, a German municipality in the Rhein-Pfalz-Kreis, Rhineland-Palatinate
- Maxdorf (Verbandsgemeinde), a German collective municipality in the Rhein-Pfalz-Kreis, Rhineland-Palatinate
