= Sobótka =

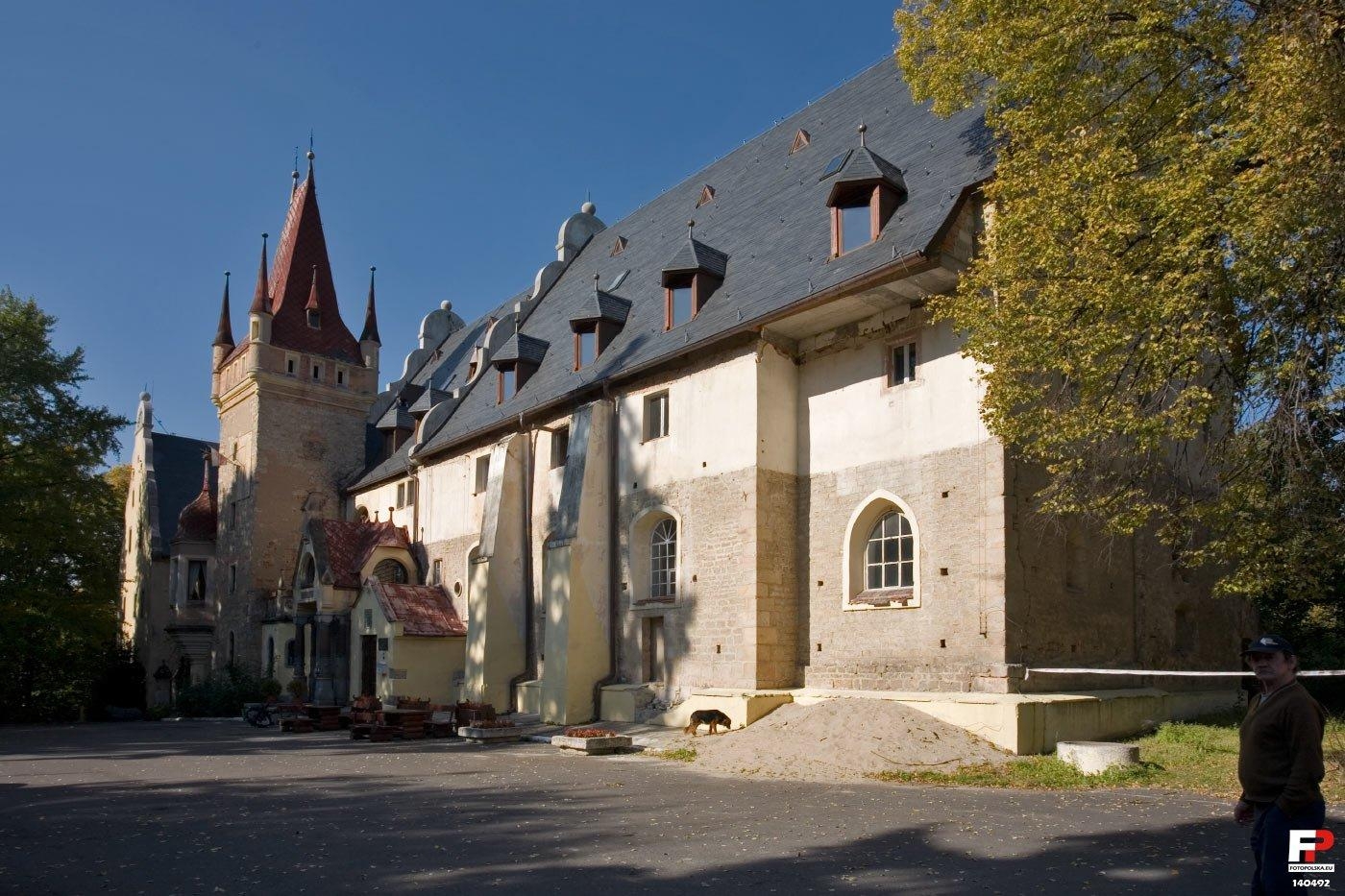
- Sobótka-Górka Castle

- Coat of arms

- Location within Poland
- Coordinates: 50°53′55″N 16°44′40″E
- Country: Poland
- Voivodeship: Lower Silesian
- County: Wrocław
- Gmina: Sobótka
- First settled: 2nd century BC
- City Rights: 1221/1399

Government
  - Mayor: Mirosław Jarosz

Area
  - Total: 32.20 km^{2} (12.43 sq mi)
- Highest elevation: 718 m (2,356 ft)
- Lowest elevation: 150 m (490 ft)

Population (2019-06-30)
  - Total: 6,981
  - Density: 216.8/km^{2} (561.5/sq mi)
- Time zone: UTC+1 (CET)
  - Summer (DST): UTC+2 (CEST)
- Postal code: 55-050
- Area code: +48 71
- Vehicle registration: DWR
- Website: http://www.sobotka.pl

Sobótka (pronounced So-boo-tka [sɔˈbutka], ) is a town in Wrocław County, Lower Silesian Voivodeship, in south-western Poland. It is the seat of the administrative district (gmina) called Gmina Sobótka. As of 2019, the town has a population of 6,981.

== History ==
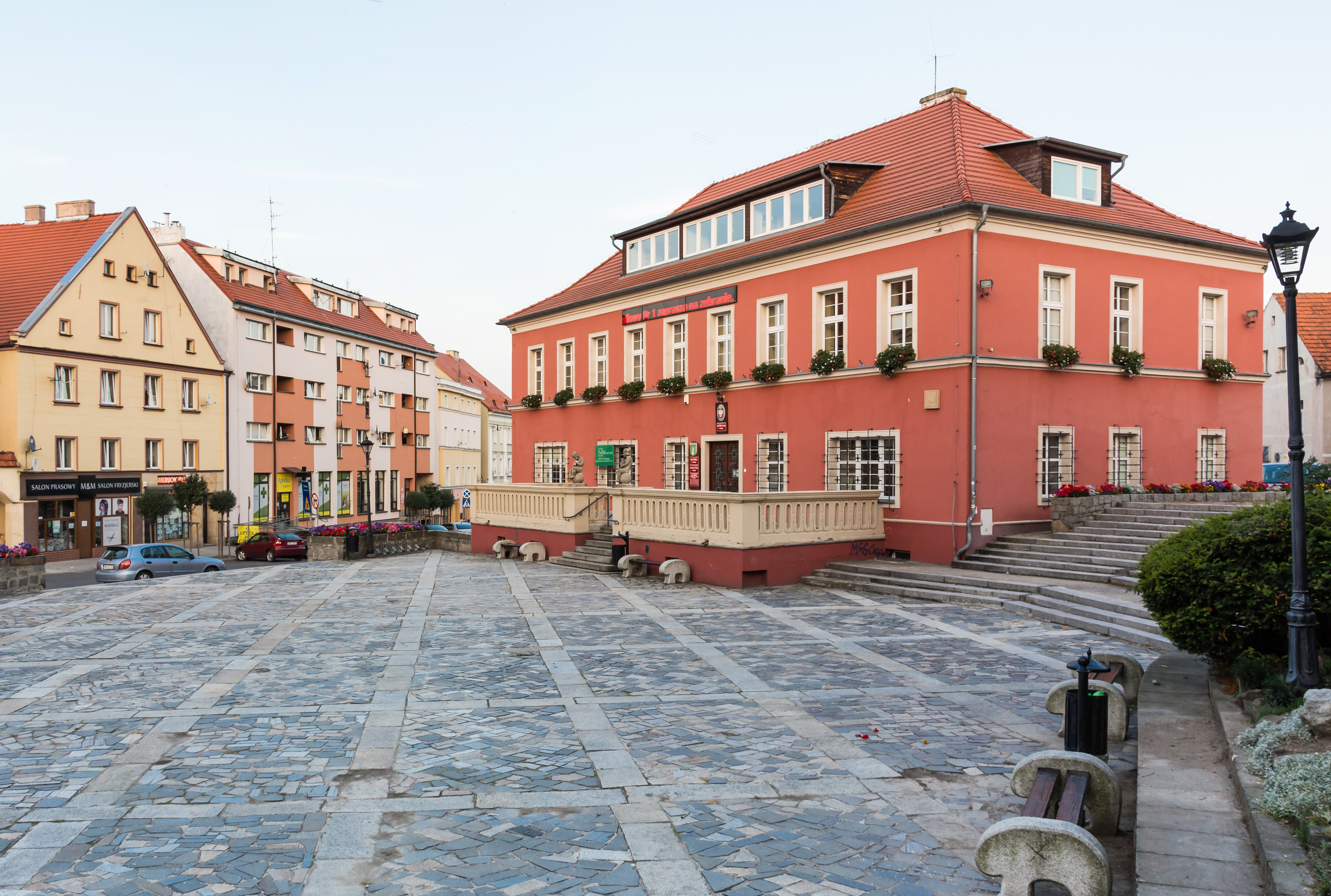
Town Hall

The area had been settled since prehistoric times, as evidenced by numerous archaeological artefacts, and in the 2nd century BC Mount Ślęża was a religious site, marking a northern outpost of their settlement area.

In 1128, the Polish voivode Piotr Włostowic established an Augustinian monastery on Mount Ślęża which was later moved to Wrocław, while the area remained a property of the Augustinian order. The settlement was first mentioned in an 1148 bull issued by Pope Eugene III as Sabath, the name most likely referring to a weekly Saturday (Latin: sabbatum, Polish: sobota) market. The market rights were confirmed by the Silesian duke Bolesław I the Tall in 1193. His son Duke Henry I the Bearded granted Sobótka town privileges based on the Magdeburg Law in 1221. The location of the city is on the ancient Amber Road and its first role was trade. After the Polish King Casimir III the Great renounced his rights to Silesia in 1348, Sobótka, as part of the Duchy of Świdnica, eventually passed to the Bohemian crown in 1392. King Wenceslaus confirmed Sobótka's town privileges in 1399. The town was again purchased by the Augustinians in 1494.

As part of the Habsburg monarchy the town was devastated by the Thirty Years' War. With most of Silesia it was annexed by the Kingdom of Prussia in 1742. King Frederick William III finally secularized the Augustinian territory in 1810. From 1871 to 1945 it was part of Germany.

After the defeat of Nazi Germany in World War II the town became part of Poland, in accordance with the provisions of the Potsdam Agreement.

On December 31, 1959, the village of Strzeblów was included within the town limits.

== Sights ==
Historic sights of Sobótka (examples)

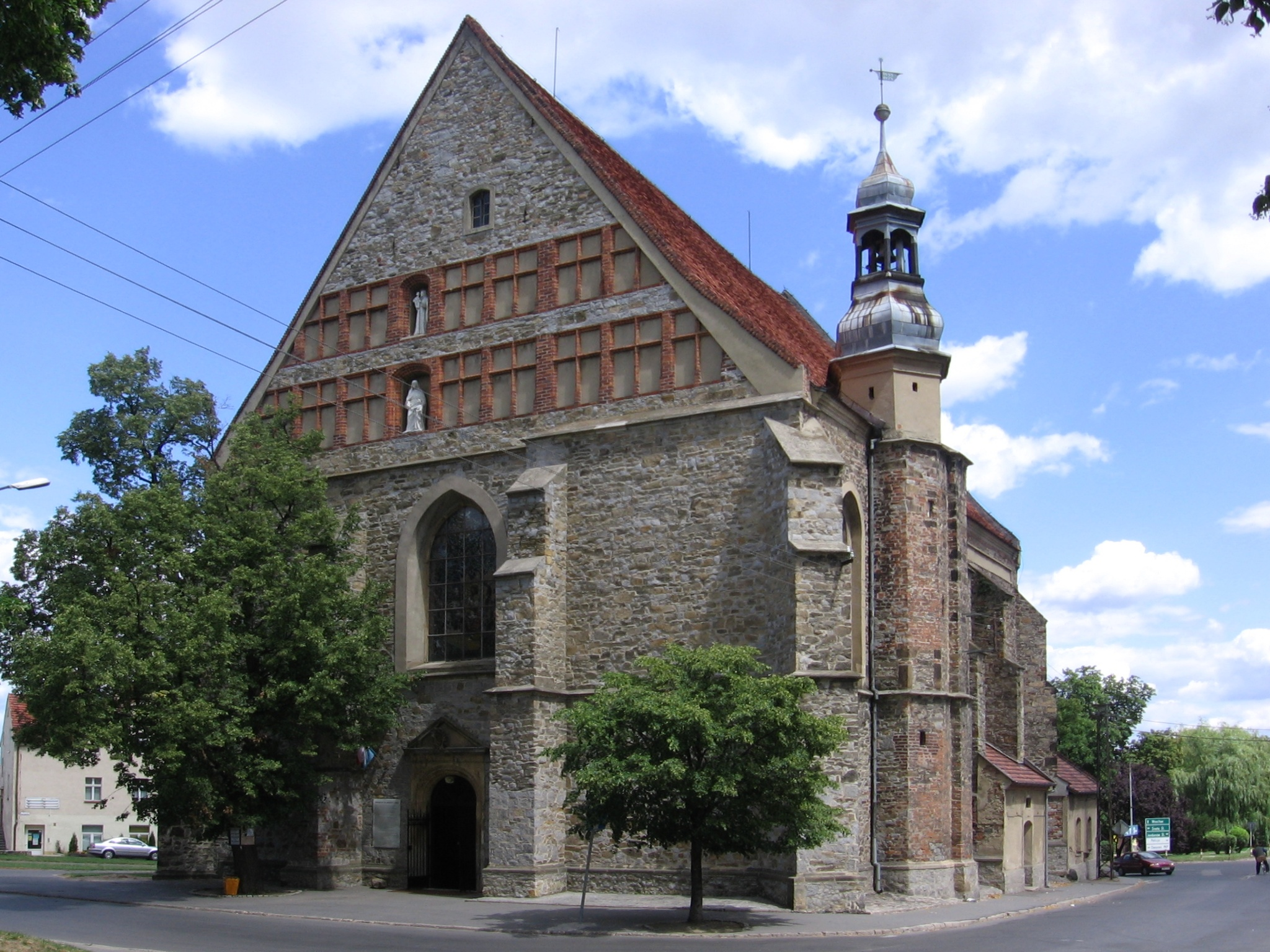
Saint Anne church

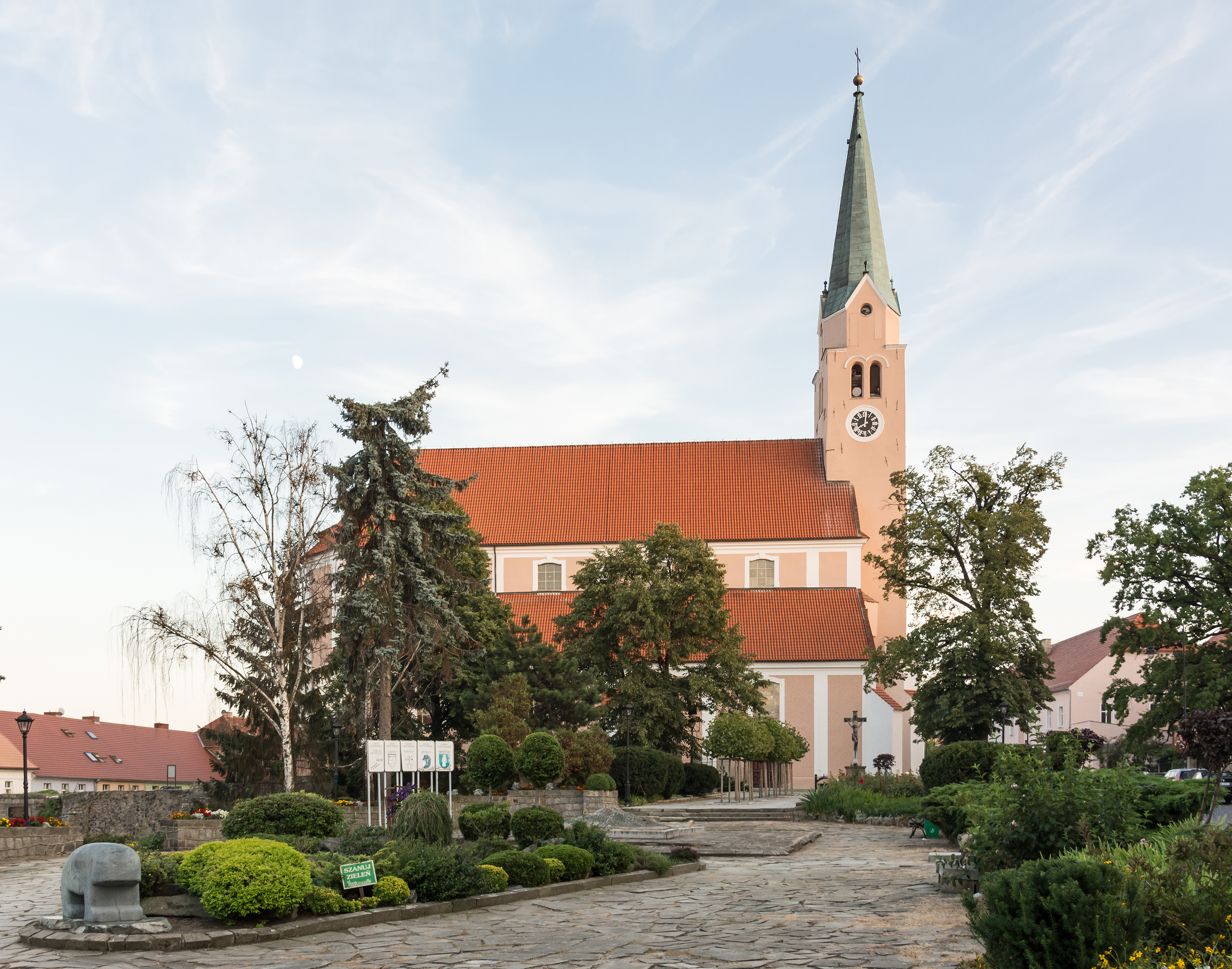
Saint James church

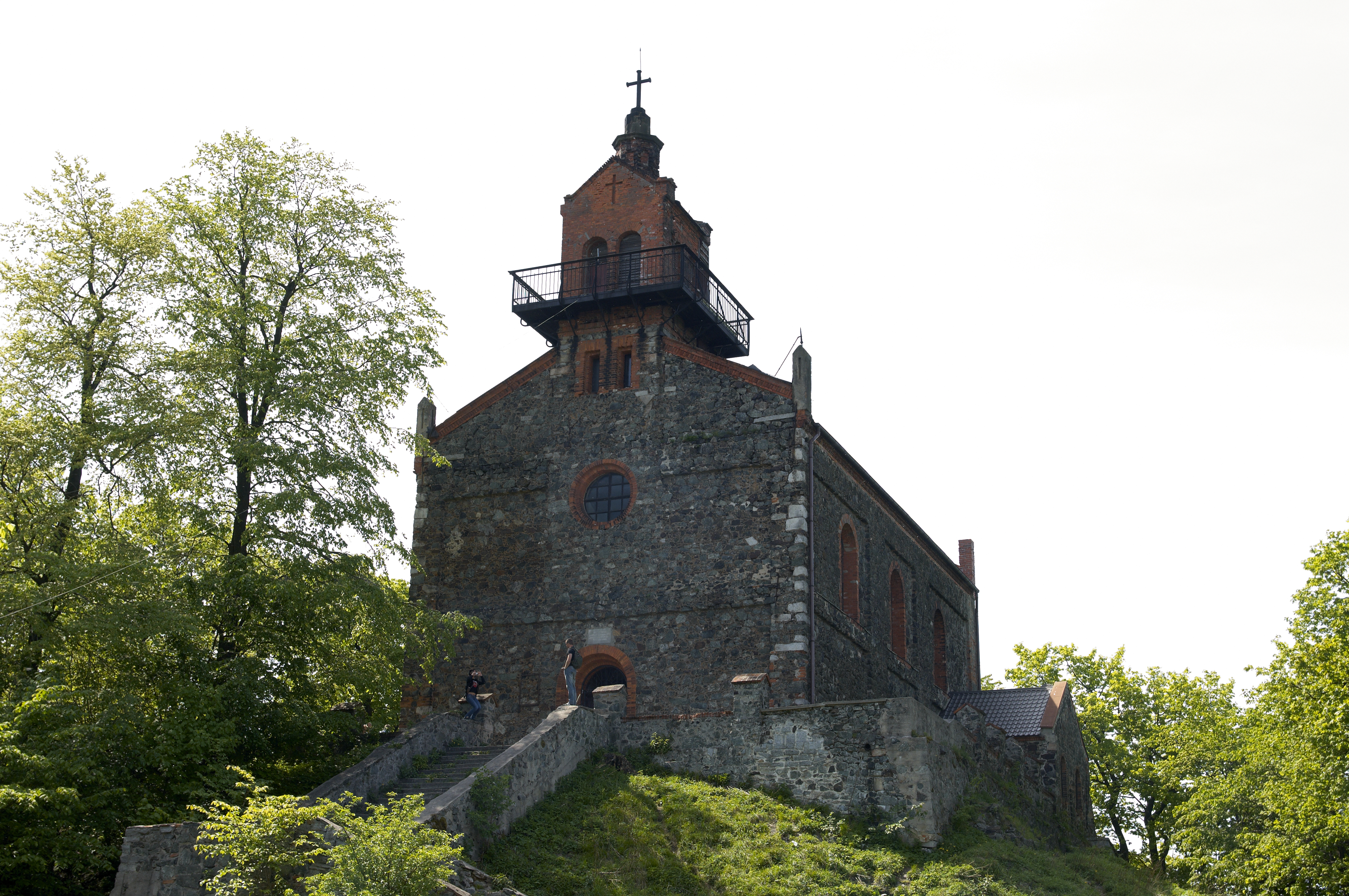
Church of the Visitation of Mary

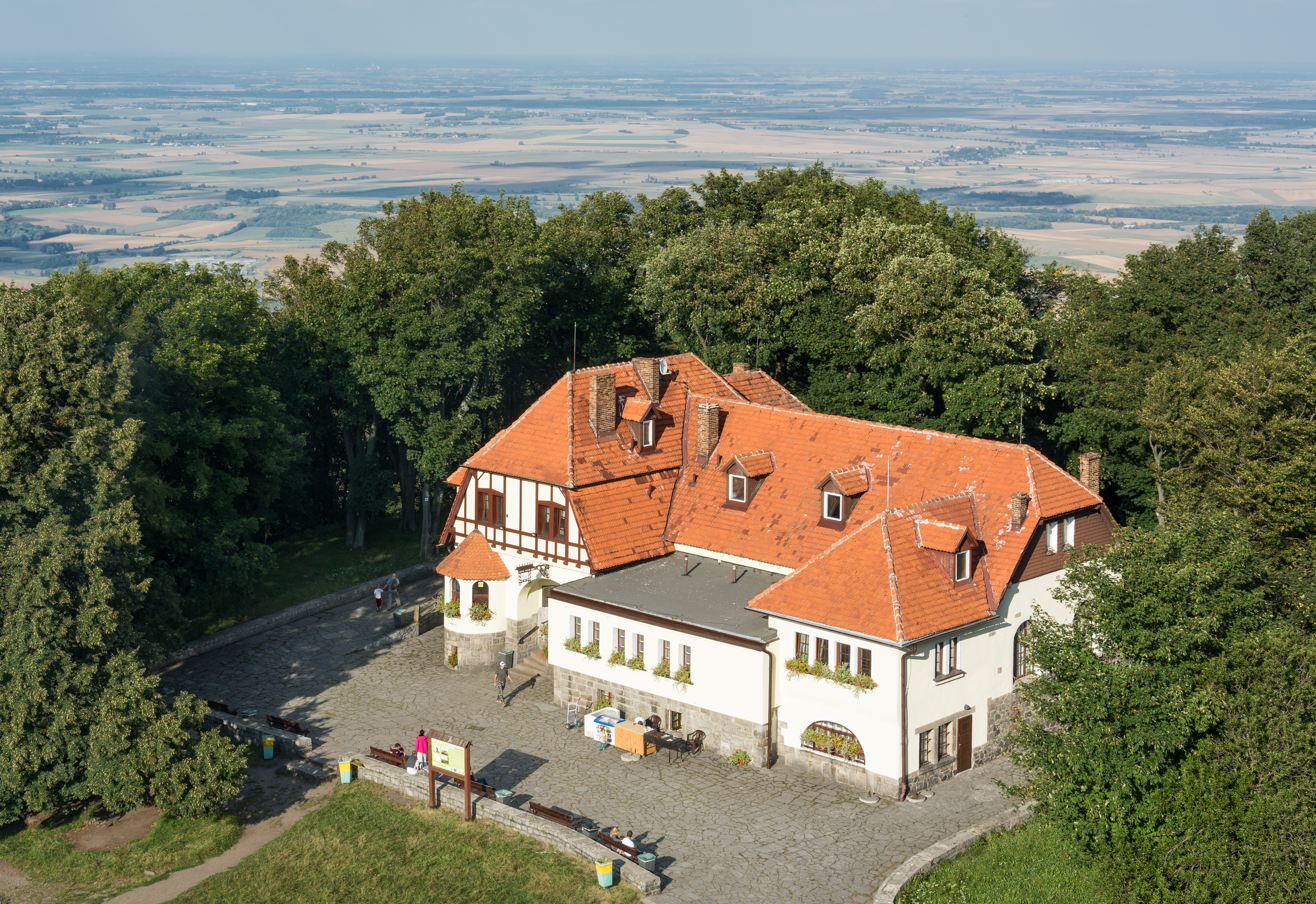
Tourist House of PTTK on Mount Ślęża

The main attraction of the area is the Mount Ślęża, one of the 28 peaks of the Crown of Polish Mountains. The name of the region Silesia comes from the name of that mountain. Now it is under reservation as "Góra Ślęża landscape and geological reservation park". With its 718 m s.l. is the highest peak of the Sudeten Foreland. Its specific microclimate allows develop of the large species of Fauna and Flora. In ancient time (bronze) it was the Pagan Solar Cult center. The Christianization of the territory begins in the 10th century. The old Tourist House of PTTK and the 19th-century Church of the Visitation of Mary are located at the sight.

There are many touristic paths as well for the pedestrians and for the cyclists. In the oldest house in center of Sobótka there is an archaeology museum of Stanisław Dunajewski showing the large exposition of what was found nearby Ślęża Mountain. Historic sights include the Sobótka-Górka castle, the churches of Saint Anne (XIII/XIV) and Saint Jacob (1738) and the town hall.

== Historical names of the city ==
- 1148 – "Sabath"
- 1193 – "Sobath"
- 1200 – "Sobat"
- 1256 – "Czobotha"
- 1329 – "Zobota"
- 1336 – "Zobotka"
- 1343 - "Czoboten"
- 1399 - "Czobothen"
- 1404 - "Czobotaw"
- 1561 - "Zobten"
- 1938 - "Zobten am Berge"
- 1945 - "Sobótka"

== Notable people ==
- Dieter Grahn (born 1944), German rower
- Tadeusz Dolny (born 1958), retired Polish football player

== Twin towns – sister cities ==
See twin towns of Gmina Sobótka.
