= Siedlakowice =

- Village
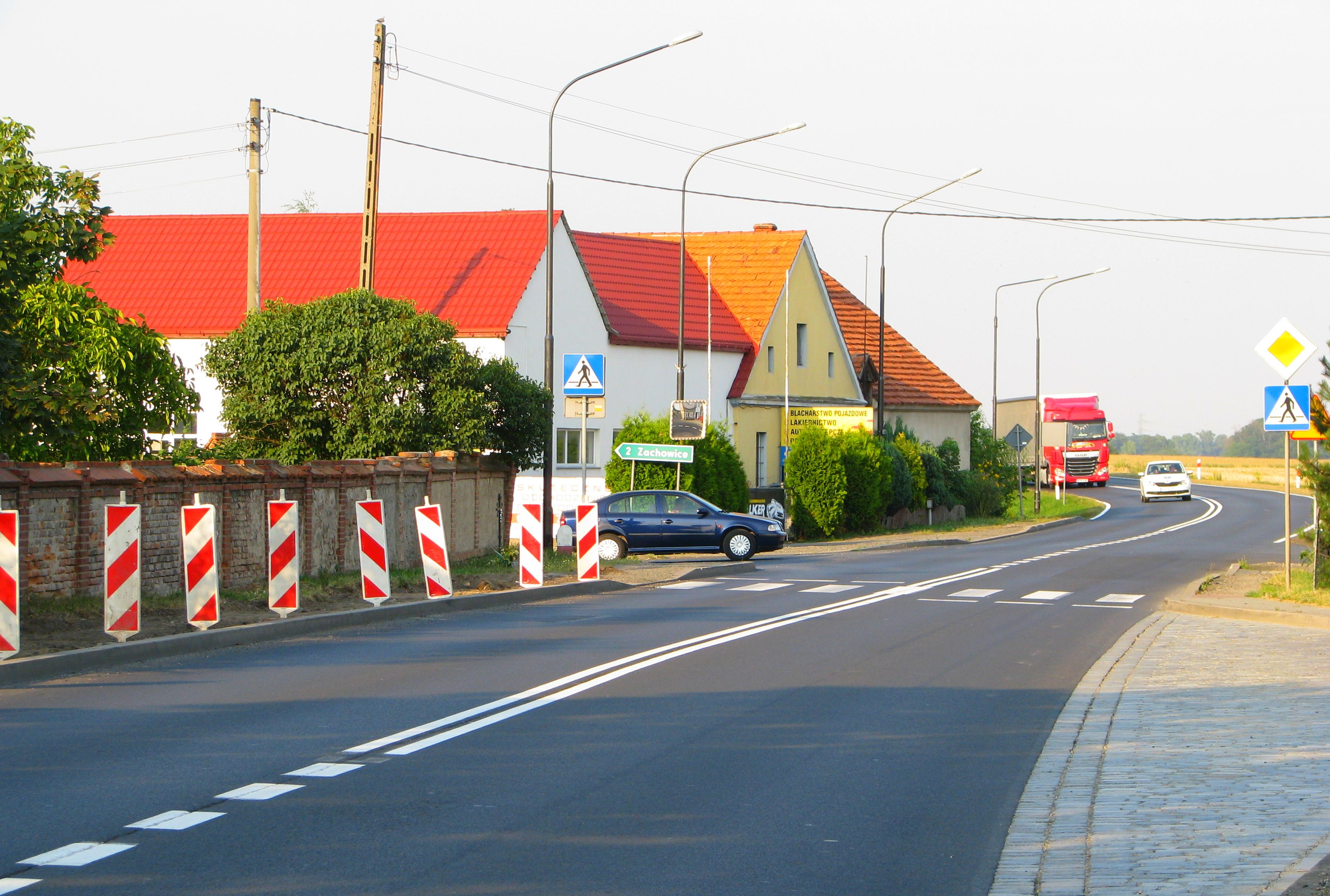

- Location within Poland
- Coordinates: 50°58′N 16°48′E
- Country: Poland
- Voivodeship: Lower Silesian
- County: Wrocław
- Gmina: Sobótka

Siedlakowice [ɕɛdlakɔˈvit͡sɛ] is a village in the administrative district of Gmina Sobótka, within Wrocław County, Lower Silesian Voivodeship, in south-western Poland.
