= Mirosławice, Lower Silesian Voivodeship =

Mirosławice
- Village
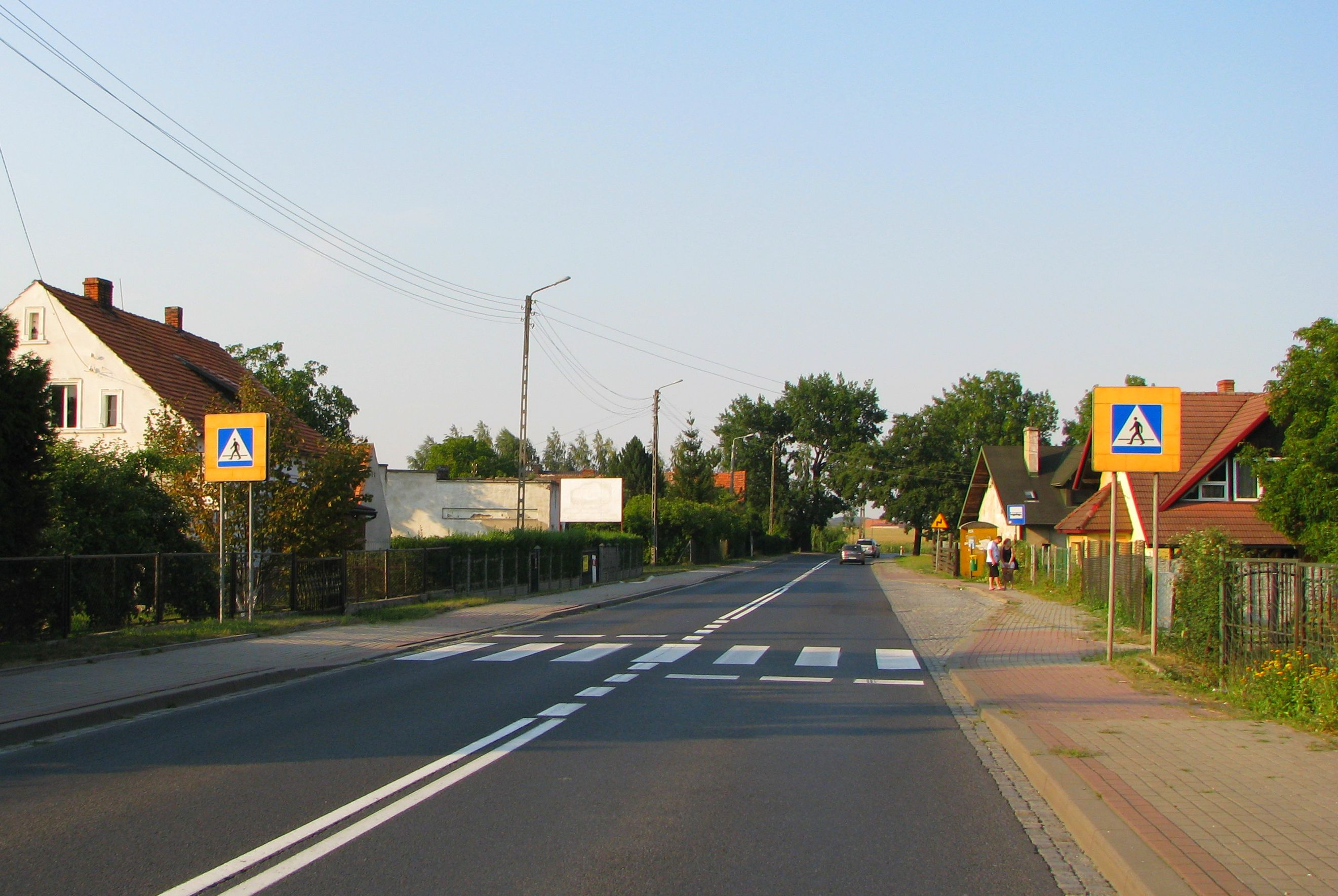

- Location within Poland
- Coordinates: 50°57′12″N 16°46′04″E
- Country: Poland
- Voivodeship: Lower Silesian
- County: Wrocław
- Gmina: Sobótka
- Time zone: UTC+1 (CET)
  - Summer (DST): UTC+2 (CEST)
- Vehicle registration: DWR

Mirosławice [mirɔswaˈvit͡sɛ] is a village in the administrative district of Gmina Sobótka, within Wrocław County, Lower Silesian Voivodeship, in south-western Poland.

== History ==
In the 10th century the area became part of the emerging Polish state, and later on, it was part of Poland, Bohemia (Czechia), Prussia, and Germany. In 1937, during a massive Nazi campaign of renaming of placenames, the village was renamed to Rosenborn to erase traces of Polish origin. During World War II, the Germans operated the E320 forced labour subcamp of the Stalag VIII-B/344 prisoner-of-war camp in the village. After the defeat of Germany in the war, in 1945, the village became again part of Poland and its historic name was restored.

In 1987, an air strip was created in Mirosławice. It is the seat of the Lower Silesian Aero Club (Aeroklub Dolnośląski), a branch of the Polish Aero Club.
