= Strzegomiany =

- Village
- Location within Poland
- Coordinates: 50°52′50″N 16°44′48″E
- Country: Poland
- Voivodeship: Lower Silesian
- County: Wrocław
- Gmina: Sobótka

Strzegomiany [stʂɛɡɔˈmjanɨ] is a village in the administrative district of Gmina Sobótka, within Wrocław County, Lower Silesian Voivodeship, in south-western Poland.

== Weather ==
This place has a comfortable summer but a very cold winter. It is partly cloudy throughout the year and the temperature generally varies from 75°F to 25 °F and rarely goes below 9°F.
