= Ręków =

- Village
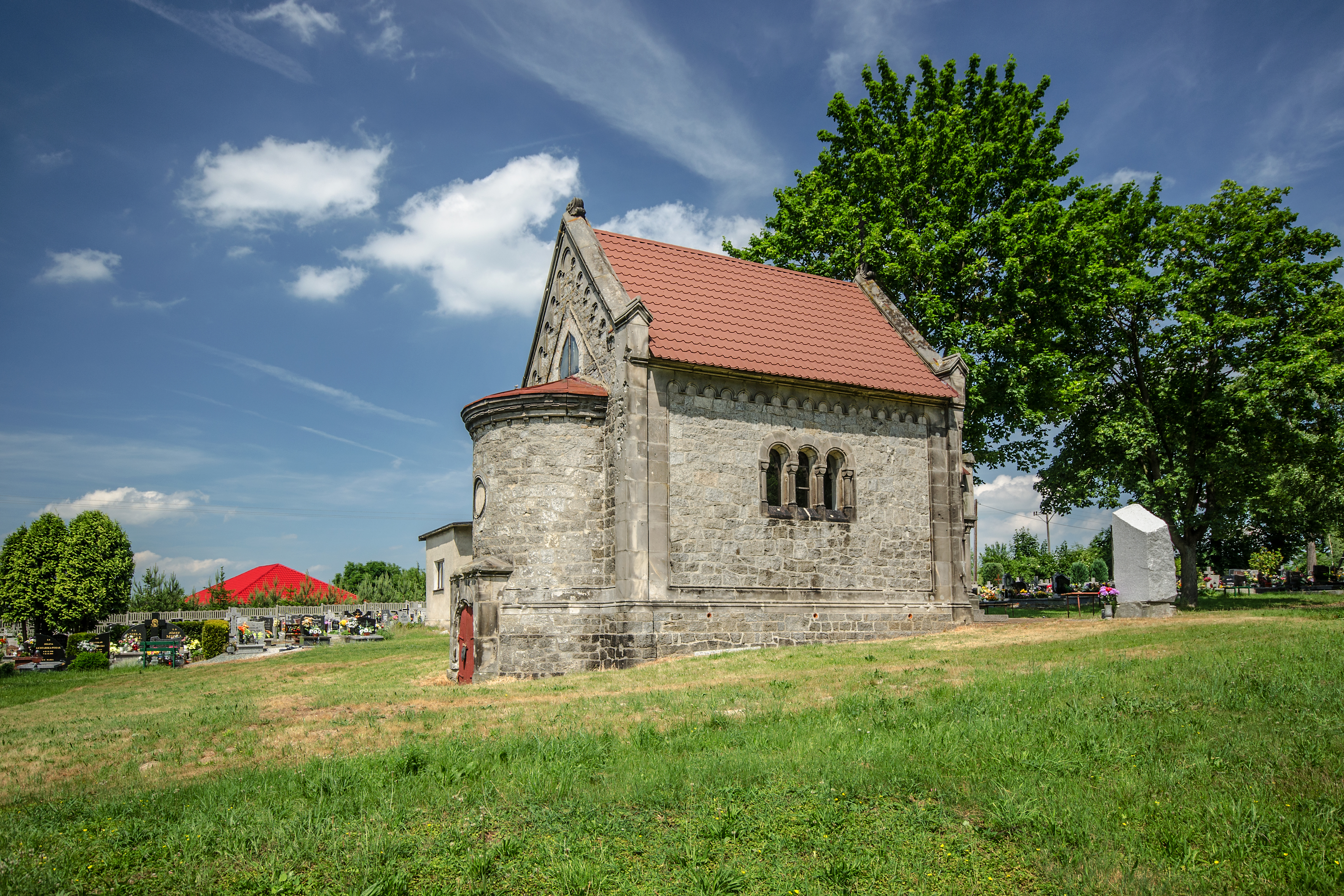

- Location within Poland
- Coordinates: 50°55′N 16°50′E
- Country: Poland
- Voivodeship: Lower Silesian
- County: Wrocław
- Gmina: Sobótka
- Elevation: 154–163 m (505–535 ft)
- Population: 414

Ręków [ˈrɛŋkuf] is a village in the administrative district of Gmina Sobótka, within Wrocław County, Lower Silesian Voivodeship, in south-western Poland.
