= Strachów, Wrocław County =

Strachów
- Village
- Location within Poland
- Coordinates: 50°54′N 16°47′E
- Country: Poland
- Voivodeship: Lower Silesian
- County: Wrocław
- Gmina: Sobótka

Strachów [ˈstraxuf] is a village in the administrative district of Gmina Sobótka, within Wrocław County, Lower Silesian Voivodeship, in south-western Poland.
