= Michałowice, Gmina Sobótka =

Michałowice
- Village
- Location within Poland
- Coordinates: 50°56′03″N 16°47′18″E
- Country: Poland
- Voivodeship: Lower Silesian
- County: Wrocław
- Gmina: Sobótka
- Elevation: 153–155 m (502–509 ft)
- Population: 195

Michałowice [mixawɔˈvit͡sɛ] is a village in the administrative district of Gmina Sobótka, within Wrocław County, Lower Silesian Voivodeship, in south-western Poland.
