= Kunów, Wrocław County =

Kunów
- Village
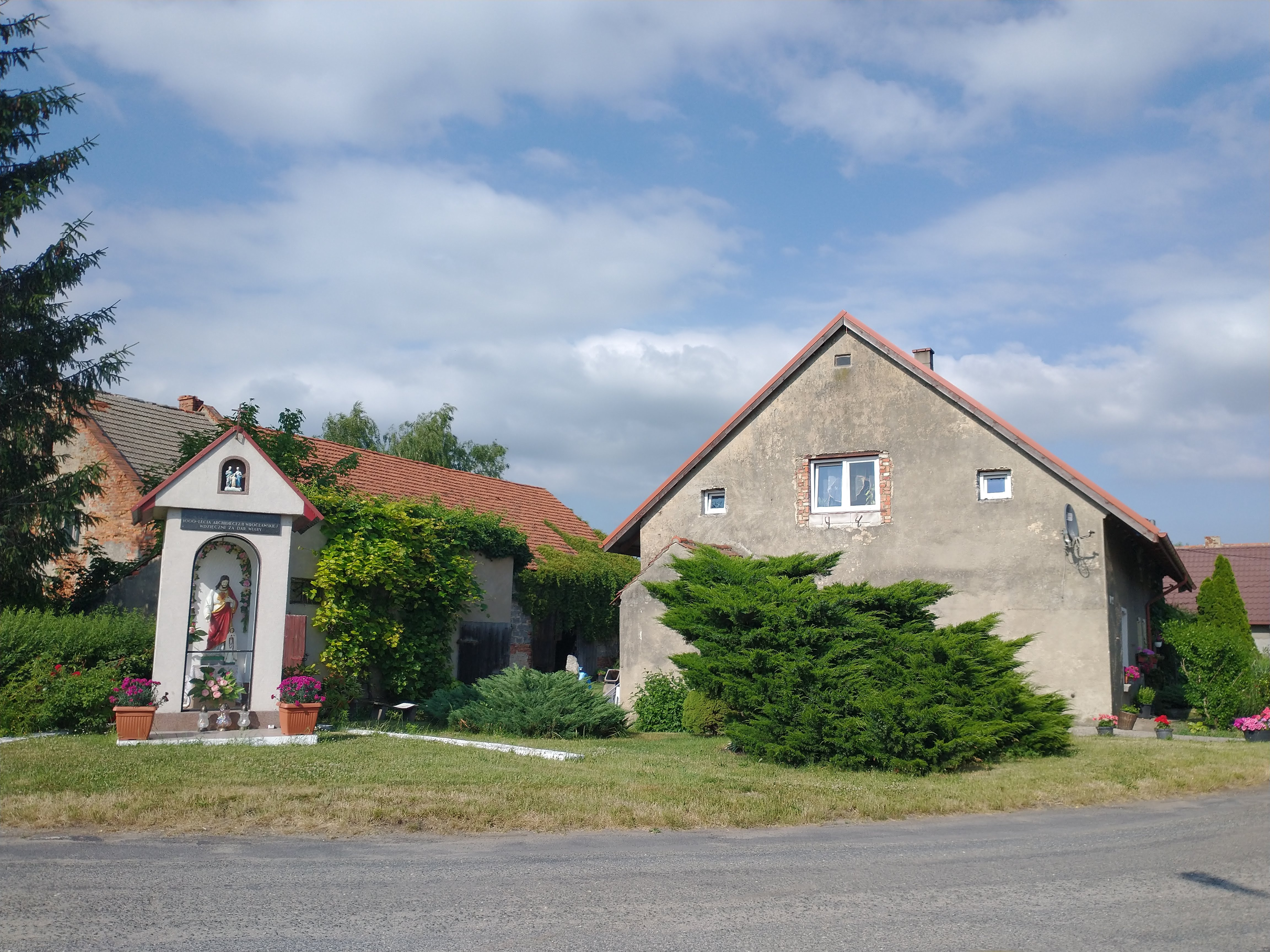

- Location within Poland
- Coordinates: 50°53′N 16°48′E
- Country: Poland
- Voivodeship: Lower Silesian
- County: Wrocław
- Gmina: Sobótka

Kunów [ˈkunuf] is a village in the administrative district of Gmina Sobótka, within Wrocław County, Lower Silesian Voivodeship, in south-western Poland.
