= Pückler =

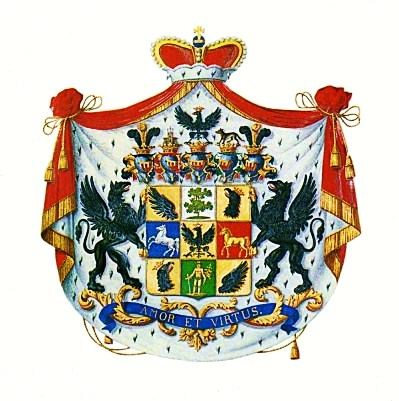
- Coat of arms of the Pückler family

Origin
- Language: German
- Region of origin: Silesia

Other names
- Variant form: Pokeler (1365)

The House of Pückler, with branches named Pückler-Muskau, Pückler-Burghauss (Pückler-Burghauß), Pückler-Limpurg and Pückler-Groditz, was an old and influential German noble family which originated from Silesia. One line of the family, the Pückler-Limpurg branch, belonged to the mediatised houses and was consequently treated as high nobility.

== History ==
The family was first mentioned in the 13th century. They obtained the title of Count in 1690, while they were rewarded with the title of Imperial Count in 1740 by Charles VI, Holy Roman Emperor.

There was one princely line created in 1822 by Friedrich Wilhelm III for Hermann, Count von Pückler-Muskau and several comital branches of the family.

The Imperial County of Pückler-Limpurg was mediatized by Württemberg when the Holy Roman Empire came to an end in 1806. As immediate, that branch belonged to the high nobility, but it became extinct in the male line in 1963.

== Notable members ==
- Count Carl Friedrich of Pückler-Burghauss, Baron of Groditz (born 1886, Friedland, Silesia, died 1945, Tschimelitz)
- Erdmann Graf von Pückler-Limpurg (1792–1869)
- Erdmann von Pückler (1832–1888)
- Heinrich von Pückler (1835–1897)
- Hermann, Prince von Pückler-Muskau (1785, Muskau Castle, Bad Muskau - 1871), German nobleman, artist, famous for the Muskau Park (Polish: Park Mużakowski)
- Karl von Pückler-Burghauß (1817–1899)
- Walter von Pückler (1860–1924), antisemitic agitator

== See also ==
- 39571 Pückler, main belt asteroid
