= Stary Zamek =

- Village
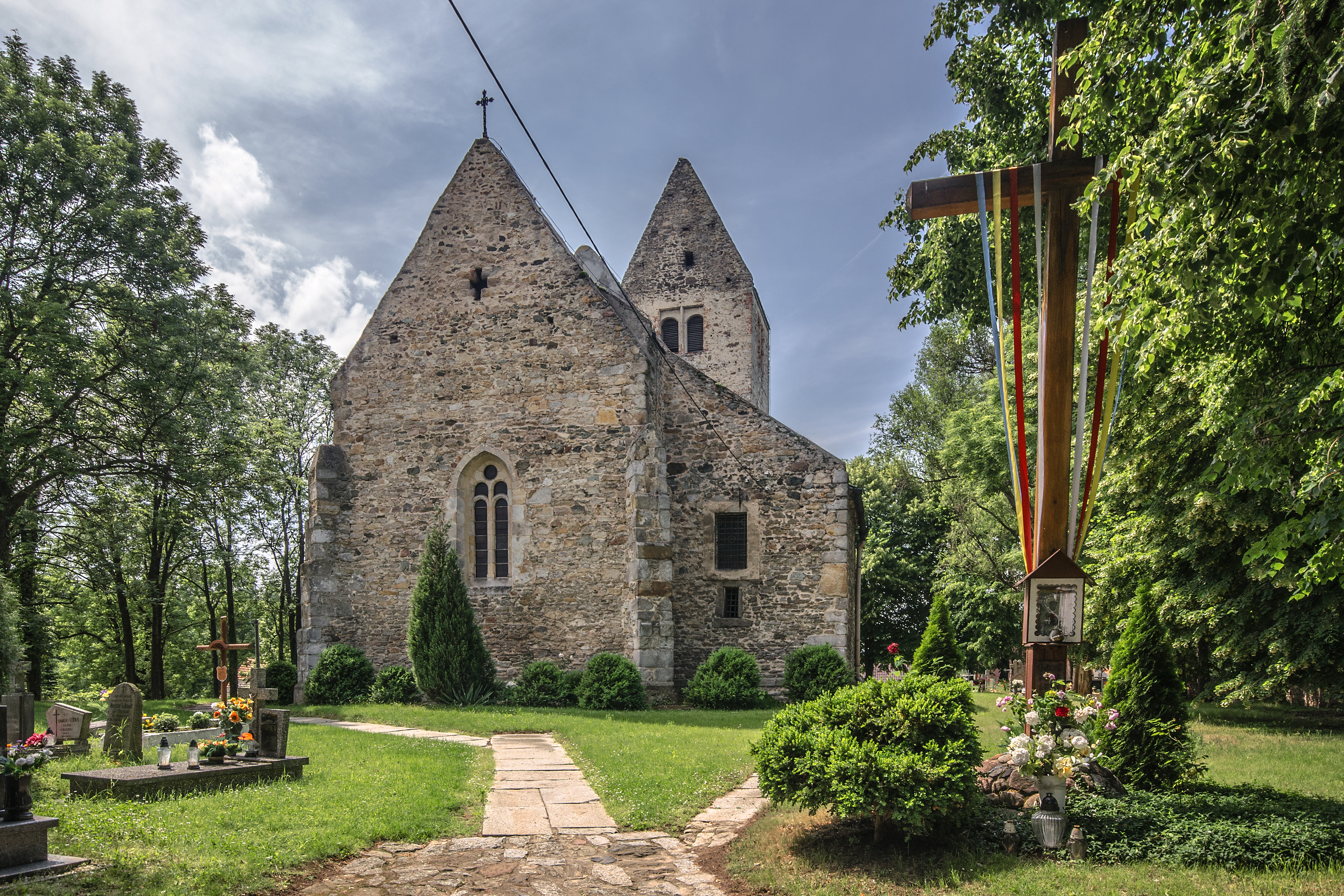
- Church of Saint Stanislaus

- Location within Poland
- Coordinates: 50°55′N 16°48′E
- Country: Poland
- Voivodeship: Lower Silesian
- County: Wrocław
- Gmina: Sobótka
- Elevation: 157–162 m (515–531 ft)

Population
  - Total: 219

Stary Zamek [ˈstarɨ ˈzamɛk] is a village in the administrative district of Gmina Sobótka, within Wrocław County, Lower Silesian Voivodeship, in south-western Poland.
