= Księginice Małe =

- Village
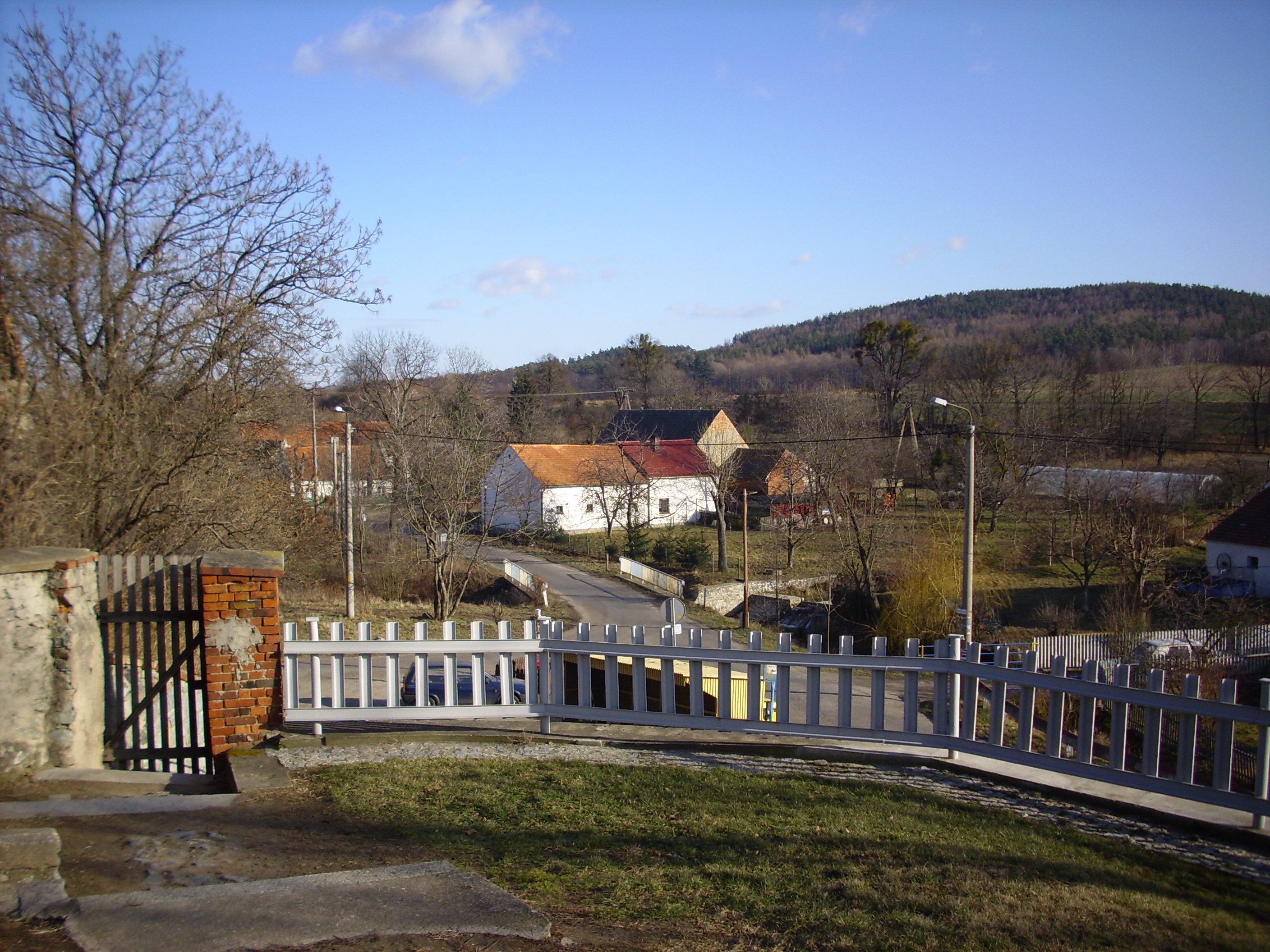

- Location within Poland
- Coordinates: 50°51′49″N 16°46′16″E
- Country: Poland
- Voivodeship: Lower Silesian
- County: Wrocław
- Gmina: Sobótka

Księginice Małe [kɕɛnɡiˈnit͡sɛ ˈmawɛ] is a village in the administrative district of Gmina Sobótka, within Wrocław County, Lower Silesian Voivodeship, in south-western Poland.
