= Gmina Sobótka =

Gmina Sobótka Sobótka Commune
- Gmina
- Coat of arms
- Interactive map of Gmina Sobótka
- Coordinates (Sobótka): 50°53′55″N 16°44′40″E
- Country: Poland
- Voivodeship: Lower Silesian
- County: Wrocław
- Seat: Sobótka

Area
  - Total: 135.35 km^{2} (52.26 sq mi)

Population (2019-06-30)
  - Total: 12,854
  - Density: 91.7/km^{2} (238/sq mi)
  - Urban: 6,981
  - Rural: 5,873
- Website: https://www.sobotka.pl

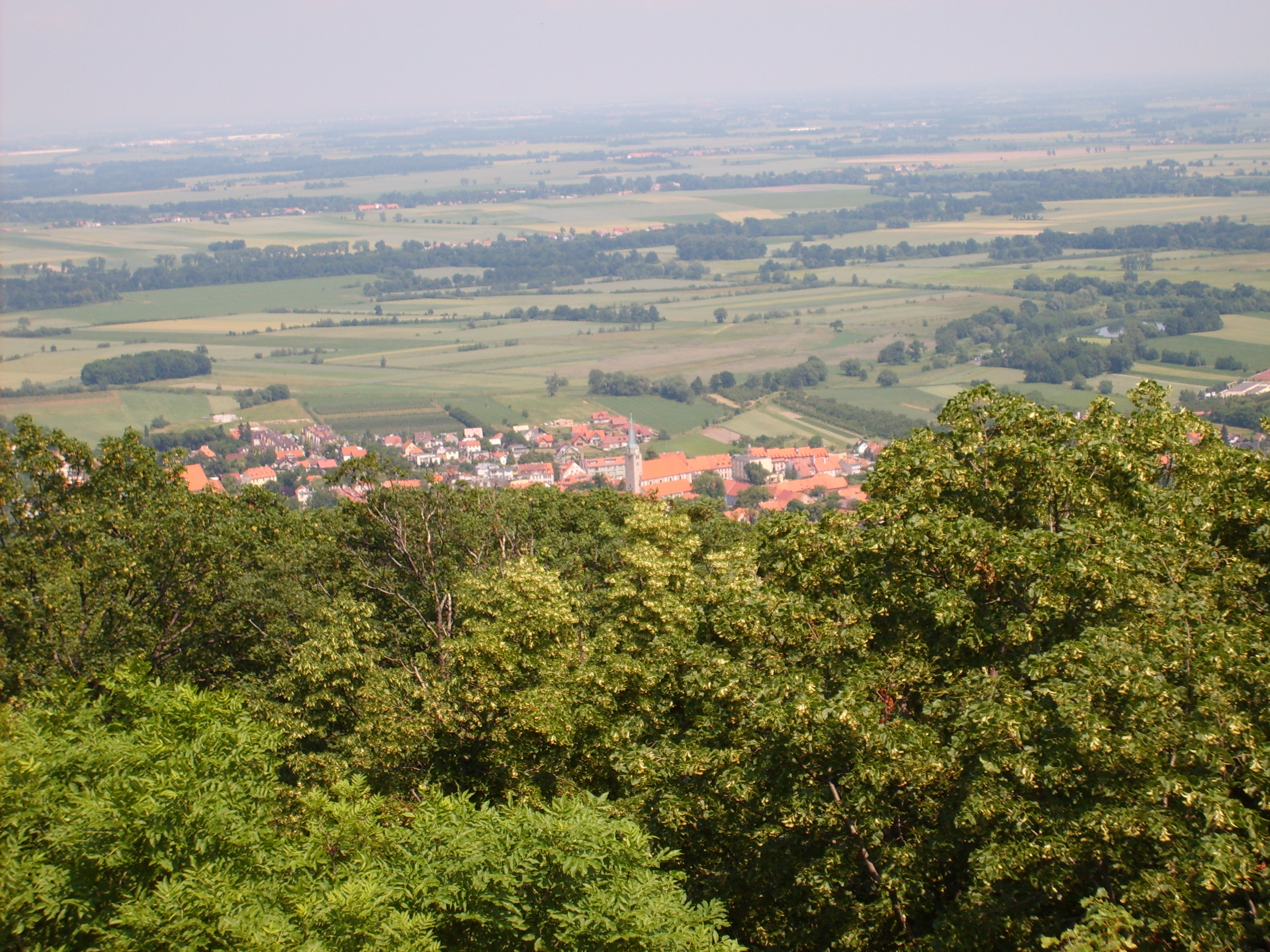
Sobótka as seen from tower on top of Wieżyca mountain

Gmina Sobótka is an urban-rural gmina (administrative district) in Wrocław County, Lower Silesian Voivodeship, in southwestern Poland. Its seat is the town of Sobótka, approximately 33 kilometres (21 mi) south-west of the regional capital Wrocław. It is part of the Wrocław metropolitan area.

The gmina covers an area of 135.35 square kilometres (52.3 sq mi), and as of 2019 its total population was 12,854.

== Neighbouring gminas ==
Gmina Sobótka is bordered by the gminas of Jordanów Śląski, Kąty Wrocławskie, Kobierzyce, Łagiewniki, Marcinowice and Mietków.

== Villages ==
Apart from the town of Sobótka, the gmina contains the villages of Będkowice, Garncarsko, Kryształowice, Księginice Małe, Kunów, Michałowice, Mirosławice, Nasławice, Okulice, Olbrachtowice, Przezdrowice, Ręków, Rogów Sobócki, Siedlakowice, Stary Zamek, Strachów, Strzegomiany, Sulistrowice, Sulistrowiczki, Świątniki, Wojnarowice and Żerzuszyce.

== Twin towns – sister cities ==
Gmina Sobótka is twinned with:

- Berga/Elster, Germany
- Gauchy, France
- Nový Malín, Czech Republic
- Sobotka, Czech Republic
