= Będkowice, Lower Silesian Voivodeship =

Będkowice
- Village
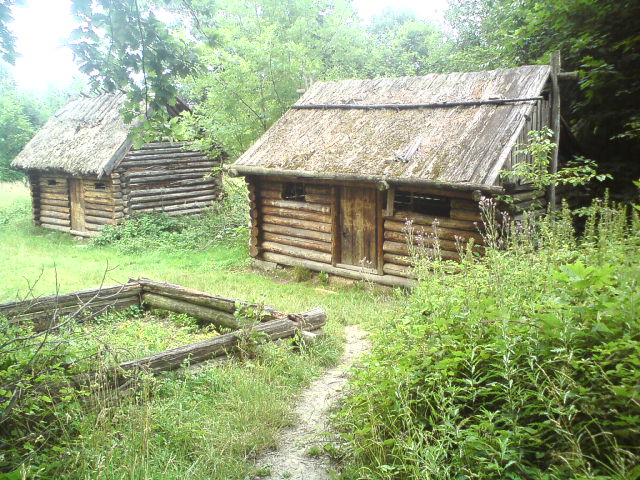
- Będkowice skansen

- Location within Poland
- Coordinates: 50°51′54″N 16°45′10″E
- Country: Poland
- Voivodeship: Lower Silesian
- County: Wrocław
- Gmina: Sobótka

Będkowice [bɛntkɔˈvit͡sɛ] is a village in the administrative district of Gmina Sobótka, within Wrocław County, Lower Silesian Voivodeship, in south-western Poland.
