= Olbrachtowice =

- Village
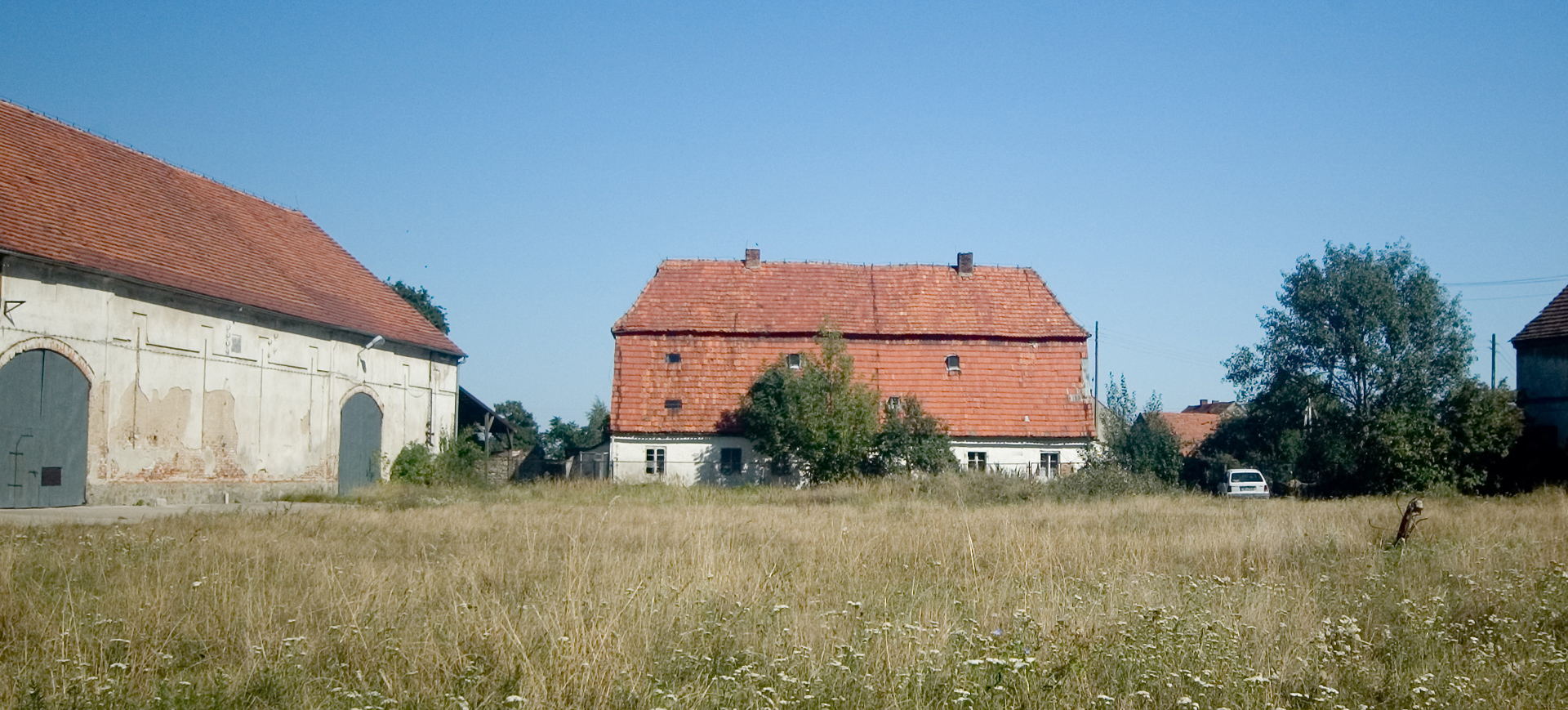

- Location within Poland
- Coordinates: 50°57′N 16°55′E
- Country: Poland
- Voivodeship: Lower Silesian
- County: Wrocław
- Gmina: Sobótka
- Elevation: 151 m (495 ft)
- Population: 198

Olbrachtowice [ɔlbraxtɔˈvit͡sɛ] is a village in the administrative district of Gmina Sobótka, within Wrocław County, Lower Silesian Voivodeship, in south-western Poland.
