= Garncarsko =

- Village
- Location within Poland
- Coordinates: 50°55′03″N 16°41′47″E
- Country: Poland
- Voivodeship: Lower Silesian
- County: Wrocław
- Gmina: Sobótka

Garncarsko [ɡarnˈt͡sarskɔ] is a village in the administrative district of Gmina Sobótka, within Wrocław County, Lower Silesian Voivodeship, in south-western Poland.
