= Sulistrowice, Lower Silesian Voivodeship =

Sulistrowice
- Village
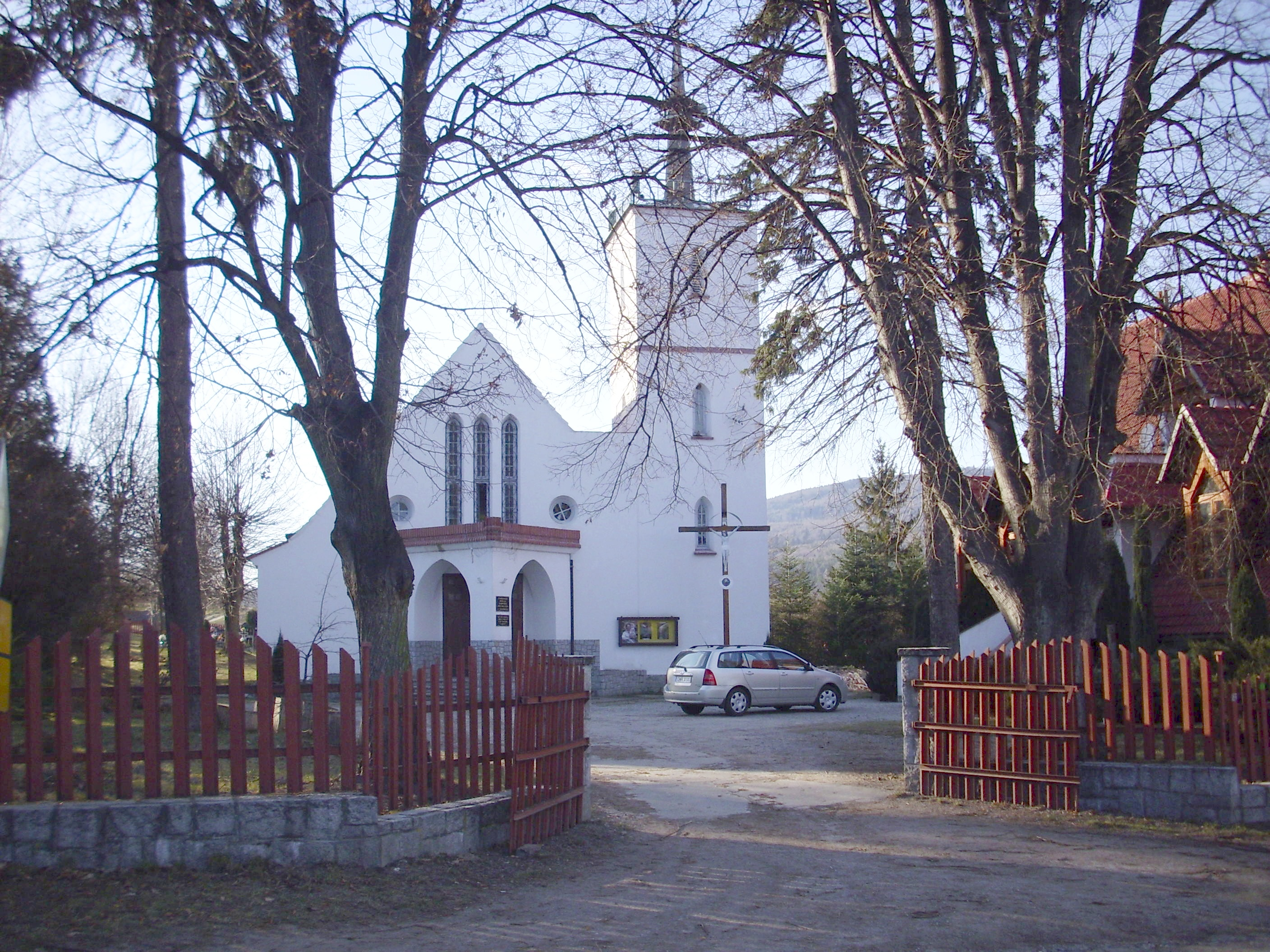
- Church of the Sacred Heart

- Location within Poland
- Coordinates: 50°51′N 16°45′E
- Country: Poland
- Voivodeship: Lower Silesian
- County: Wrocław
- Gmina: Sobótka

Sulistrowice [sulistrɔˈvit͡sɛ] is a village in the administrative district of Gmina Sobótka, within Wrocław County, Lower Silesian Voivodeship, in south-western Poland.
