= Okulice, Lower Silesian Voivodeship =

Okulice
- Village
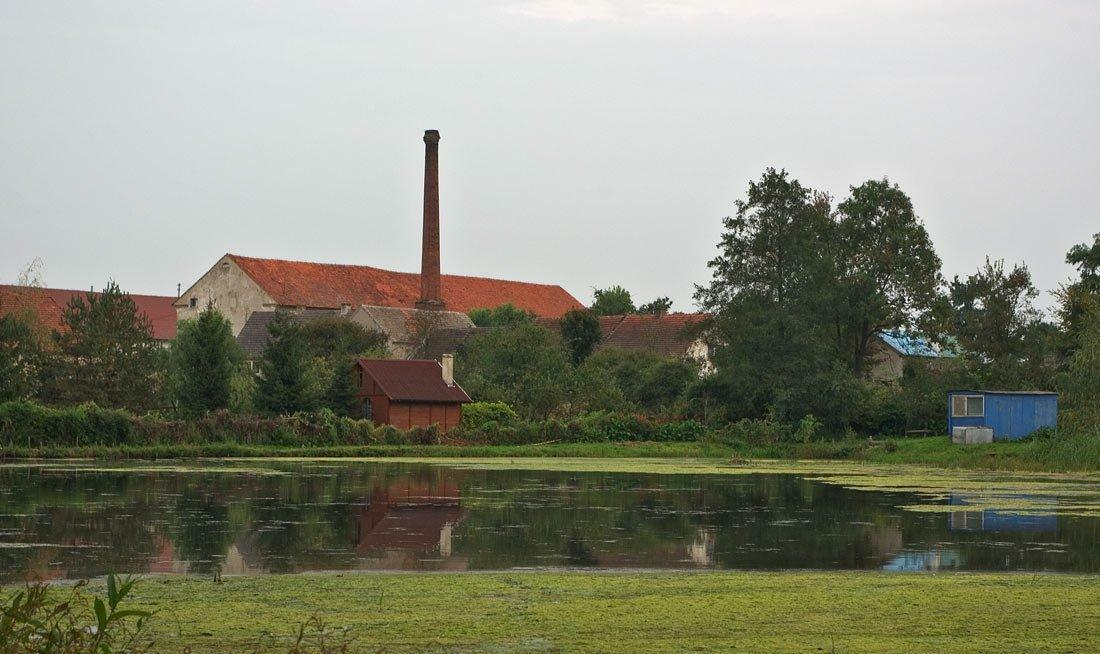

- Location within Poland
- Coordinates: 50°57′58″N 16°43′47″E
- Country: Poland
- Voivodeship: Lower Silesian
- County: Wrocław
- Gmina: Sobótka

Okulice [ɔkuˈlit͡sɛ] is a village in the administrative district of Gmina Sobótka, within Wrocław County, Lower Silesian Voivodeship, in south-western Poland.
