= Rogów Sobócki =

- Village
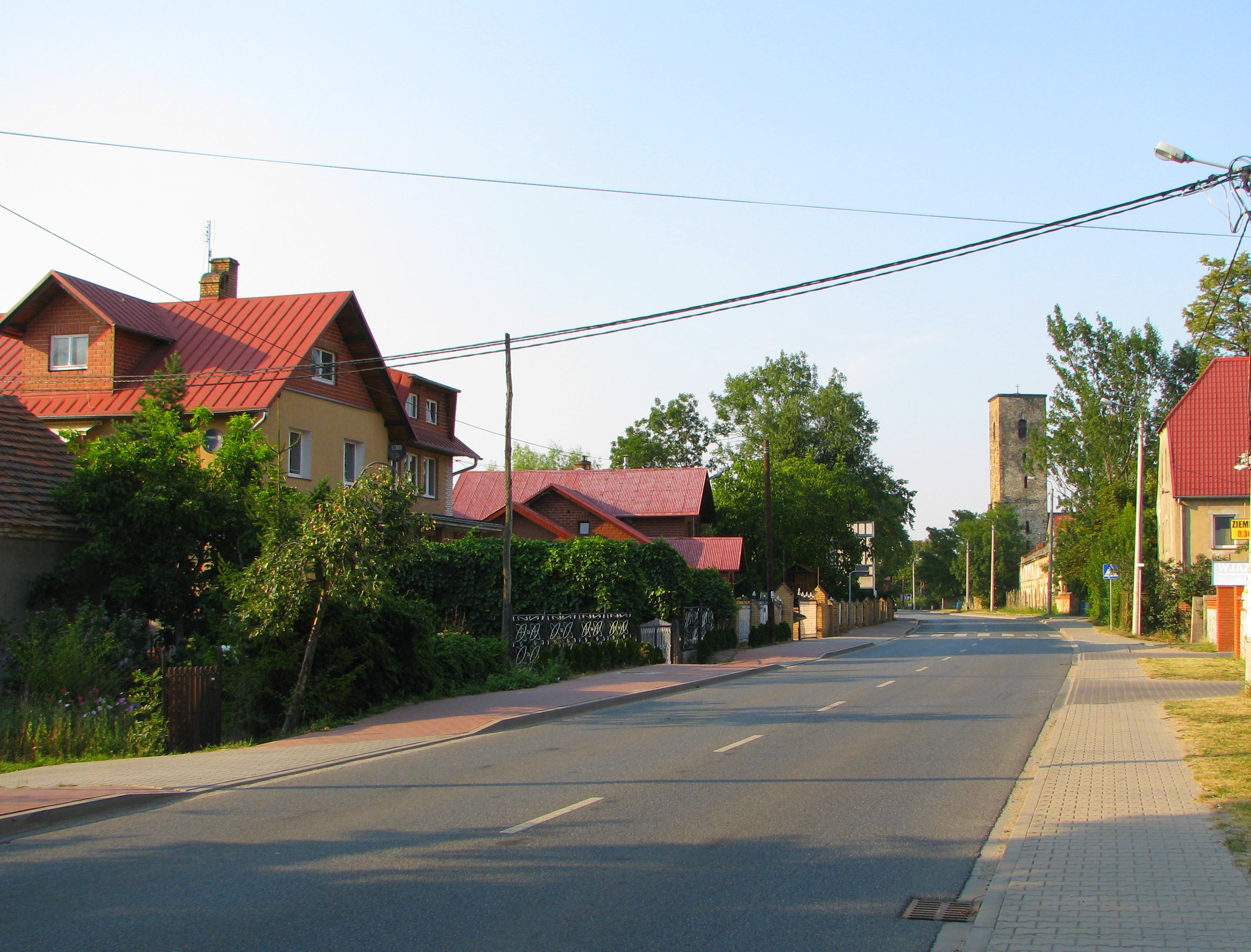

- Location within Poland
- Coordinates: 50°55′43″N 16°45′32″E
- Country: Poland
- Voivodeship: Lower Silesian
- County: Wrocław
- Gmina: Sobótka
- Population: 980
- Website: http://rogowsob.pl.tl

Rogów Sobócki [ˈrɔɡuf sɔˈbut͡ski] is a village in the administrative district of Gmina Sobótka, within Wrocław County, Lower Silesian Voivodeship, in south-western Poland.

== People ==
- Erdmann von Pückler (1792–1869), Prussian politician and agriculture minister
