= Jarząbkowice =

Jarząbkowice may refer to the following places in Poland:

- Jarząbkowice, Lower Silesian Voivodeship (south-west Poland)
- Jarząbkowice, Silesian Voivodeship (south Poland)
