= Osieczyna =

- Village
- Location within Poland
- Coordinates: 51°01′19″N 16°36′39″E
- Country: Poland
- Voivodeship: Lower Silesian
- County: Środa
- Gmina: Kostomłoty
- Time zone: UTC+1 (CET)
  - Summer (DST): UTC+2 (CEST)
- Vehicle registration: DSR

Osieczyna [ɔˈɕɛt͡ʂɨna] is a settlement, part of the village of Godków, in the administrative district of Gmina Kostomłoty, within Środa County, Lower Silesian Voivodeship, in south-western Poland.

== Transport ==
The Polish A4 motorway runs nearby, north of Osieczyna.
