= Godków =

Godków may refer to the following places in Poland:

- Godków, Lower Silesian Voivodeship (south-west Poland)
- Godków, West Pomeranian Voivodeship (north-west Poland)
