= Lisowice =

Lisowice may refer to the following places in Poland:

- Lisowice, Legnica County in Lower Silesian Voivodeship (south-west Poland)
- Lisowice, Gmina Kostomłoty, Środa County in Lower Silesian Voivodeship (south-west Poland)
- Lisowice, Łódź East County in Łódź Voivodeship (central Poland)
- Lisowice, Pajęczno County in Łódź Voivodeship (central Poland)
- Lisowice, Silesian Voivodeship (south Poland)
