= Kulturkampf =

Prussian church-state conflict (1872–1878)

The Kulturkampf (German pronunciation: [kʊlˈtuːɐ̯ˌkamp͡f]; lit. 'Cultural Struggle') was the seven-year political conflict (1871–1878) between the Catholic Church in Germany led by Pope Pius IX and the Kingdom of Prussia, led by Chancellor Otto von Bismarck, as well as other German states. The Prussian church-and-state political conflict was about the church's direct control over both education and ecclesiastical appointments in the Prussian kingdom. Moreover, when compared to other church-and-state conflicts about political culture, the Kulturkampf of Prussia also featured anti-Polish sentiment.

In modern political usage, the German term Kulturkampf describes any conflict (political, ideological, or social) between the secular government and the religious authorities of a society. The term also describes the great and small culture wars among political factions that hold deeply opposing values and beliefs within a nation, a community, and a cultural group.

== Background ==
=== Europe and the Catholic Church ===
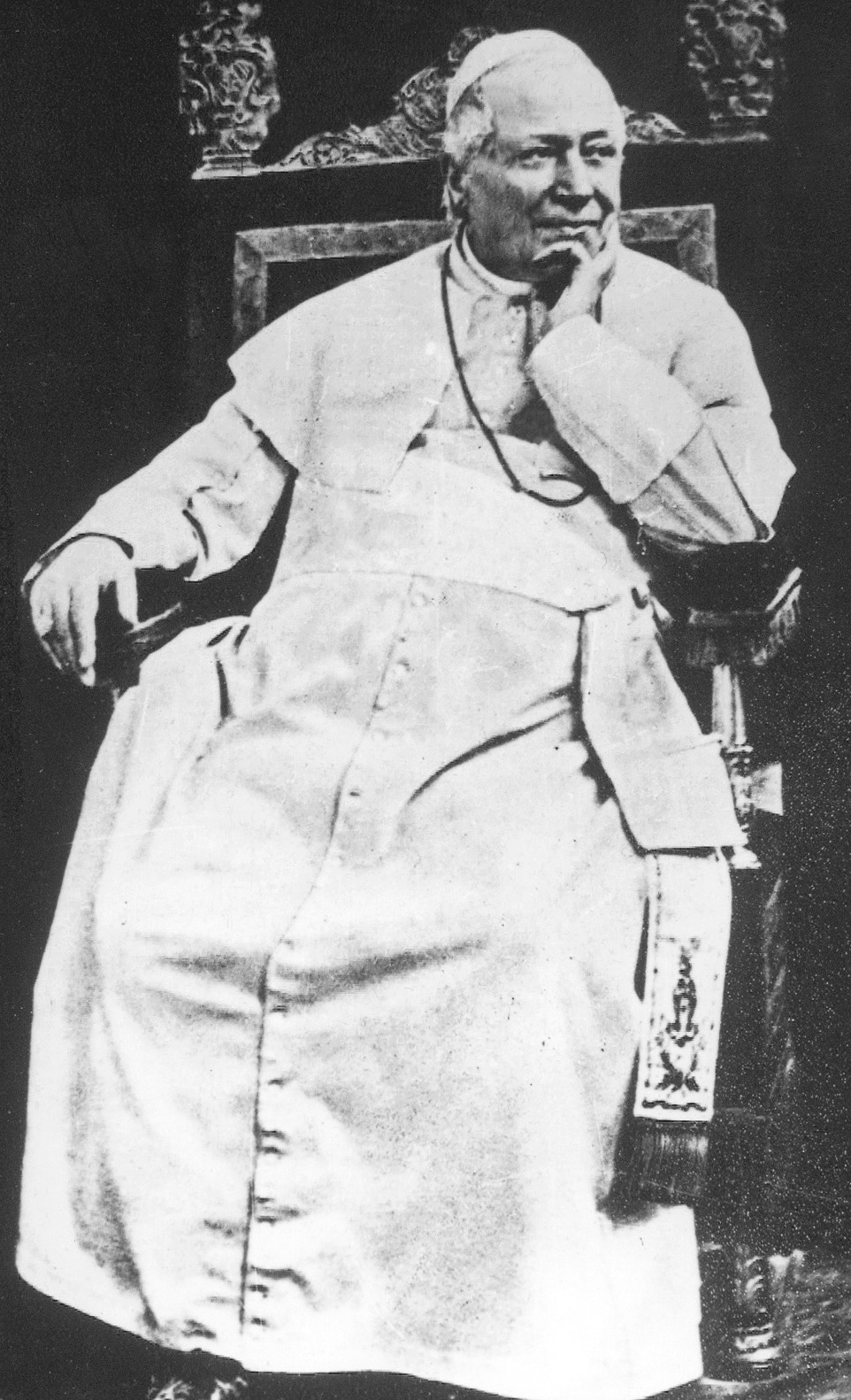
Pope Pius IX, c. 1878

The philosophic influences of the Enlightenment, scientific realism, positivism, materialism, nationalism, secularism, and liberalism impinged upon and ended the intellectual and political roles of religion and the Catholic Church, which then was the established church of Europe (excluding Scandinavia, the Russian Empire, the Netherlands, Great Britain, and crucially Prussia). By way of the legislated separation of church and state, the Age of Reason reduced society's financial debts to the Church and rendered secular the public sphere of society, and established the state's supremacy concerning the content and administration of public education for all of society. During the Age of Reason in the 17th and the 18th centuries, the European Kulturkampf principally occurred in the regional and local politics of a society, especially in cities and towns where the educated populations were politically Liberal and practised the politics of anti-clericalism and of anti-Catholicism.

The Catholic Church resisted such intellectual trends, which often were associated with attacks on the religion itself. With the growing influence of enlightenment and after having lost much of its wealth, power, and influence in the course of the secularization of the early 19th century, the Church had been in a state of decline. The papacy was at a weak point in its history, having in 1870 lost all its territories to Italy, with the pope a "prisoner in the Vatican". The Church strove to regain its influence and to hold sway in such matters as marriage, family, and education. It initiated a Catholic revival by founding associations, papers, schools, social establishments and new orders, and encouraging religious practices such as pilgrimages, mass assemblies, devotion to the Virgin Mary, or the Sacred Heart of Jesus, and the veneration of relics; the pope himself became an object of devotion.

Apart from the growth in religious orders, the 19th century was a time when numerous Catholic associations and organisations were founded, especially in Germany and in France. In the United States, there was a comparable rise in fraternal organizations in the late 19th century. Catholic propaganda, including the interpretation of daily events, was promoted through local and national Catholic newspapers that were prominent in all Western European nations. In addition, organised missions and groups were dedicated to producing pious literature.

In the 19th century, the popes issued a series of encyclicals, such as Mirari vos (1832) by Pope Gregory XVI, condemning liberalism and freedom of the press. These generated controversy in some quarters. Under the leadership of Gregory's successor, Pope Pius IX, the church dogmatised Mary's Immaculate Conception in 1854. In 1864, Pius IX published the encyclical Quanta cura with its appended Syllabus Errorum ("Syllabus of Errors"), and in 1870 convened the First Vatican Council. In turn, the Council proclaimed the dogma of papal infallibility. In Syllabus Errorum, Pius IX condemned as false some 80 philosophical and political statements. It rejected outright such concepts as freedom of religion, separation of church and state, civil marriage, sovereignty of the people, liberalism and socialism, reason as the sole base of human action, and in general condemned the idea of conciliation with progress. The announcements included an index of forbidden books. The Church gradually re-organised and began to use mass media expansively to promote its messages. In addition, the popes worked to increase their control of the Church. The Church centralised some functions and streamlined its hierarchy, which prompted strong criticism by European governments. The bishops sought direction from the Holy See, and the needs and views of the international church were given priority over the local ones. Opponents of the new hierarchical church organisation pejoratively called it ultramontanism.

In view of the church's opposition to enlightenment, liberal reforms, and the revolutions of the 18th and 19th centuries, these dogmas angered the liberal-minded across Europe, even among some Catholics. Debates were heated. The dogmas were perceived as threatening the secularized state, as they reaffirmed that the fundamental allegiance of Catholics was not to their nation-state, but to the Gospel and the Church. The pope's teaching was promoted as absolutely authoritative and binding on all the faithful. Secular politicians wondered whether "Catholicism and allegiance to the modern liberal state were not mutually exclusive". British Prime Minister William Ewart Gladstone wrote in 1874 that the teaching on papal infallibility compromised the allegiance of faithful English Catholics. For European liberalism, the dogmas were perceived as a declaration of war against the modern state, science, and spiritual freedom.

The pope's handling of dissent from the dogmas, e.g. by excommunication of critics or demanding their removal from schools and universities, was considered the "epitome of papal authoritarianism". In direct response to papal announcements, Austria passed the May Laws for Cisleithania in 1868, restricting the Concordat of 1855, and then cancelled the Concordat altogether in 1870. Saxony and Bavaria withheld approval to publish the papal infallibility dogma; Hesse and Baden even denied it any legal validity. France refused to publish the doctrines altogether; Spain forbade publication of Syllabus Errorum in 1864.

=== Germany ===
==== Pre-1871 ====
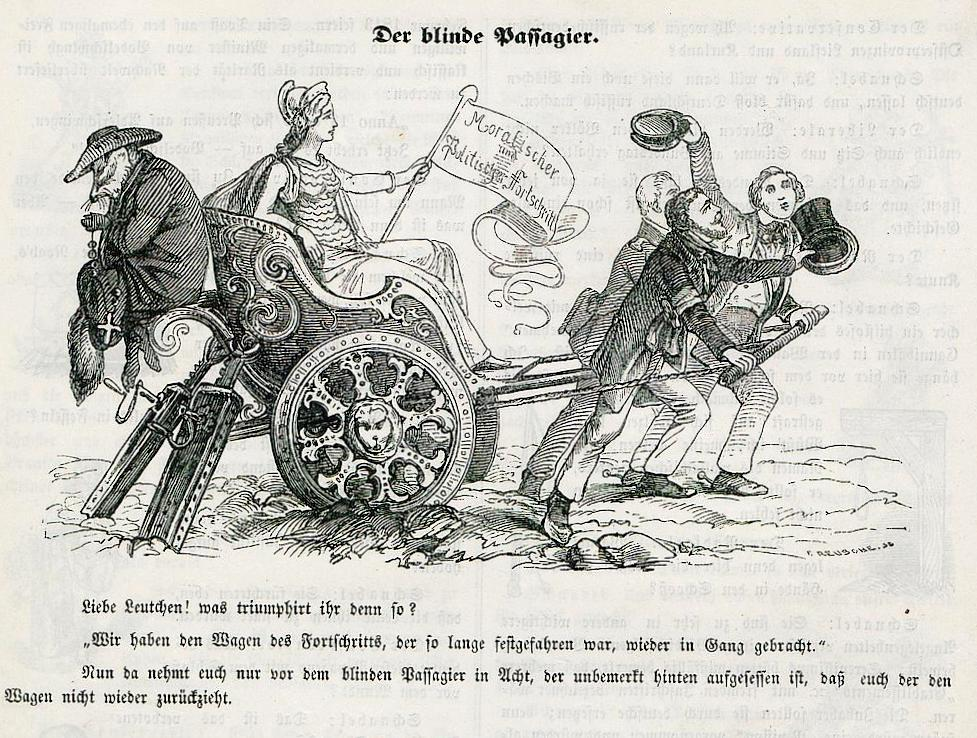
Anti-Catholic caricature in the Munich Leuchtkugeln, 1848. A warning not to rejoice yet. The Catholic cleric as a fox and blind passenger on the wagon of progress, in order to later reverse the course of history.

By the mid-19th century, liberal policies had also come to dominate Germany and the separation of church and state became a prominent issue. The Kulturkampf in Prussia is usually bracketed by the years 1871 and 1878, with the Catholic Church officially announcing its end in 1880; however, the struggle in Germany had been an ongoing matter without definite beginning and the years 1871 to 1878 only mark its culmination in Prussia. In the wake of other European countries, most German states had taken the first steps in secularisation well before unification. Predominantly Catholic Baden was at the forefront of curbing the power of the Catholic Church, as in the Baden Church Dispute (1852–1854) and the Kulturkampf Baden (1864–1876).

Other examples are Prussia (1830s, 1850, 1859, and 1969), Württemberg (1859/1862), Bavaria (Bayerischer Kulturkampf, 1867), Hesse-Nassau or Hesse-Darmstadt. In the 1837 Kölner Wirren (Cologne Confusion) of legal and policy issues regarding the children of mixed Protestant-Catholic marriages, Prussia's final settlement was considered a defeat for the state as it had given in to the demands of the Catholic Church. In 1850, Prussia again had a dispute with the church about civil marriage and primary schools and in 1852, it issued decrees against the Jesuits. As in many European countries, Jesuits were being banned or heavily restricted in many of the German states, e.g. in Saxony (1831), Baden (1960) or Württemberg (1862), and even in Catholic ones such as Bavaria (1851).

In the Vormärz period, Catholic publications usually portrayed revolutions as negative and dangerous to the existing order as well as to the interests of the Catholic Church. Most of them considered a viable Catholicism to be necessary for the very health of society and state and to be the only true and effective protection against the scourge of revolution. The unsuccessful German revolutions of 1848–1849, which the Catholic Church had opposed, produced no democratic reforms and attempts to radically disentangle state-church relationships failed. In the revolutionary parliament, many prominent representatives of political Catholicism sat on the right wing. In the years following the revolution, Catholicism became increasingly politicized due to rising liberal ideologies contrasted with the anti-modernist and anti-liberal policies of the Vatican. The Catholic dogmas and doctrines promulgated in 1854, 1864 and 1870 were perceived in Germany as direct attacks on the modern nation state.

Bismarck, the Liberals, and the Conservatives, representing orthodox Protestants, found the Centre Party's support of the pope highly provocative. Many Catholics shared these sentiments, especially against the pope's declared infallibility and the majority of Catholic German bishops deemed the definition of the dogma as "unpropitious in light of the situation in Germany". While most Catholics eventually reconciled themselves to the doctrine, some founded the small breakaway Old Catholic Church. According to the Bavarian head of government, Hohenlohe, the dogma of infallibility compromised the Catholics' loyalty to the state. He sent a circular letter to all the diplomatic representatives of the Bavarian Kingdom saying, "The only dogmatic thesis which Rome desires to have decided by the Council, and which the Jesuits in Italy and Germany are now agitating, is the question of the Infallibility of the Pope. This pretension, once become a dogma, will have a wider scope than the purely spiritual spheres, and will become evidently a political question: for it will raise the power of the Sovereign Pontiff, even in temporal matters, above all the princes and peoples of Christendom."

The liberal majorities in the Imperial Diet and the Prussian parliament, as well as liberals in general, regarded the Church as backward, a hotbed for reactionaries, enemies of progress and cast monastic life as the epitome of a backward Catholic medievalism. They were alarmed by the dramatic rise in the number of monasteries, convents and clerical religious groups in an era of widespread religious revival. The Diocese of Cologne, for example, saw a tenfold increase in monks and nuns between 1850 and 1872. Prussian authorities were particularly suspicious of the spread of monastic life among the Polish and French minorities. In turn, the Church saw the National-Liberals as its worst enemy, accusing them of spearheading the war against Christianity and the Catholic Church.

==== 1871–1872 ====
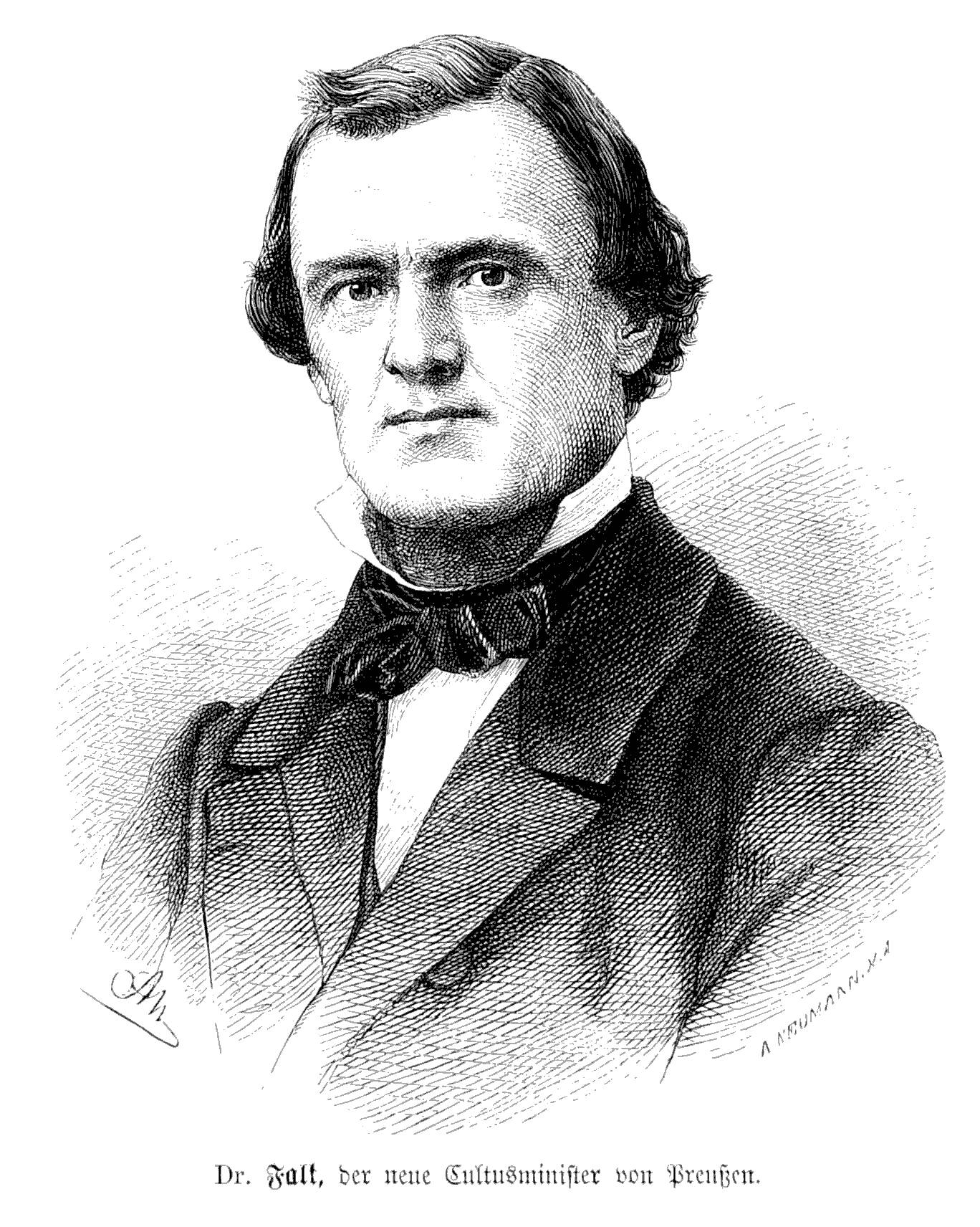
Prussian Minister of Education Adalbert Falk, 1872

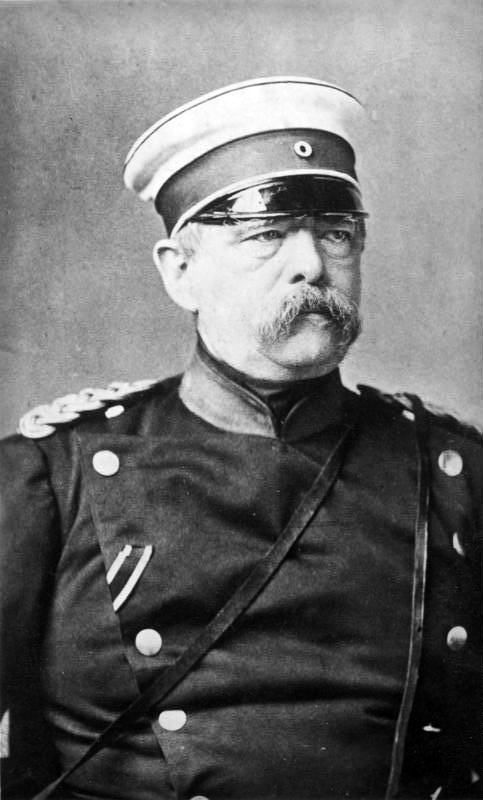
Otto von Bismarck, c. 1875

At unification in 1871, the new German Empire included 25.5 million Protestants (62% of the population) and 15 million Catholics (36.5% of the population). Although a minority in the empire, Catholics were the majority in the states of Bavaria and Baden as well as in the four Prussian Provinces of West Prussia, Posen, Rhineland, Westphalia and in the Prussian region of Upper Silesia, and in the territory of Alsace-Lorraine. Since the Thirty Years' War, the population was generally segregated along religious lines and rural areas or towns were overwhelmingly, if not entirely, of the same religion. Education was also separate and usually in the hands of the churches. There was little mutual tolerance, interaction or intermarriage. Protestants in general were deeply distrustful of the Catholic Church. Unification had been achieved through many obstacles with strong opponents. These were the European powers of France and Austria, both Catholic nations. For Bismarck, the empire was very fragile and its consolidation was an important issue. Biographer Otto Pflanze notes that "all of these developments, real and imagined, reinforced Bismarck's belief in the existence of a widespread Catholic conspiracy that posed a threat to both his German and European policies."

In a nation state dominated by Protestant Prussia, the Catholic Church was to lose its standing. Thus, in 1870, on the eve of unification, the Center Party was explicitly founded to defend the position of the church in the new empire. Bismarck was highly concerned that many major members and supporters of this new party were not in sympathy with the new empire: the House of Hanover, the ethnic minority of the Poles and the southern German states. In 1871, the predominantly Catholic states of Southern Germany had only reluctantly joined the empire, increasing the overall share of the Catholic population to 36.5%. Among this Catholic share was Germany's largest ethnic minority, well over 2 million Poles in the east of Prussia, who under Prussia and Germany suffered discrimination and oppression. Bismarck regarded the new Centre Party not only as an illegal mixup of politics and religion and the church's "long arm" but also as a unifying force for Catholic Germans and Poles and thus a threat to the consolidation of the empire. He feared that the Centre Party would frustrate his broader political agendas and he accused the Catholic priests of fostering Polish nationalism as had been done openly in the provinces of Posen and Upper Silesia.

The Liberals regarded the Catholic Church as a powerful force of reaction and anti-modernity, especially after the proclamation of papal infallibility in 1870 and the tightening control of the Vatican over the local bishops. The renewed vitality of Catholicism in Germany, with its mass gatherings, also attracted Protestants – even the heir to the Prussian throne, with the king's approval, attended one. Anti-liberalism, anti-clericalism and anti-Catholicism became powerful intellectual forces of the time and the antagonism between Liberals and Protestants on one side and the Catholic Church on the other was fought out through mud-slinging in the press. A wave of anti-Catholic, anticlerical and anti-monastic pamphleteering in the liberal press was answered by anti-liberal preaching and propaganda in Catholic newspapers and vice versa. For these reasons, the government sought to wean the Catholic masses away from the hierarchy and the Centre Party and the liberals' demands to curb the power of the churches meshed well with Bismarck's main political objective to crush the Centre Party. According to historian Anthony J. Steinhoff:

Bismarck's plan to disarm political Catholicism delighted liberal politicians, who provided the parliamentary backing for the crusade. Yet, the phrase the left-liberal Rudolf Virchow coined for this struggle, the Kulturkampf, suggests that the liberals wanted to do more than prevent Catholicism from becoming a political force. They wanted victory over Catholicism itself, the long-delayed conclusion of the Reformation.

At least since 1847 and in line with the Liberals, Bismarck had also been of the professed opinion, that state and church should be completely separated and "the sphere of the state had to be made secure against the incursions by the church", although his ideas were not as far-reaching as in the United States or in Great Britain. He had in mind the traditional position of the Protestant church in Prussia and provoked considerable resistance from conservative Protestants. This became clear in a heated debate with Prussian culture minister von Mühler in 1871 when Bismarck said: "Since you stopped my plans in the Protestant church, I have to go via Rome." In August 1871, at Bad Ems, Bismarck revealed his intention to fight against the Centre Party, to separate state and church, to transfer school inspection to laymen, to abolish religious instruction from schools and to transfer religious affairs to the minister of justice.

On 22 January 1872, liberal Adalbert Falk replaced conservative Heinrich von Mühler as Prussian minister for religion, education and health. In Bismarck's mind, Falk was "to re-establish the rights of the state in relation to the church". Yet, unlike Bismarck, whose main motivation for the Kulturkampf was the political power struggle with the Centre Party, Falk, a lawyer, was a strong proponent of state authority, having in mind the legal aspects of state-church relationships. Falk became the driving force behind the Kulturkampf laws. Although Bismarck publicly supported Falk, he doubted the success of his laws and was unhappy with his lack of political tact and sensitivity. The differences in their attitudes concerning the Kulturkampf eventually put the two politicians at odds with each other. With this background and the determination of church and state, the Kulturkampf in Germany acquired an additional edge as it gathered in intensity and bitterness.

== Timeline, 1871–1876 ==
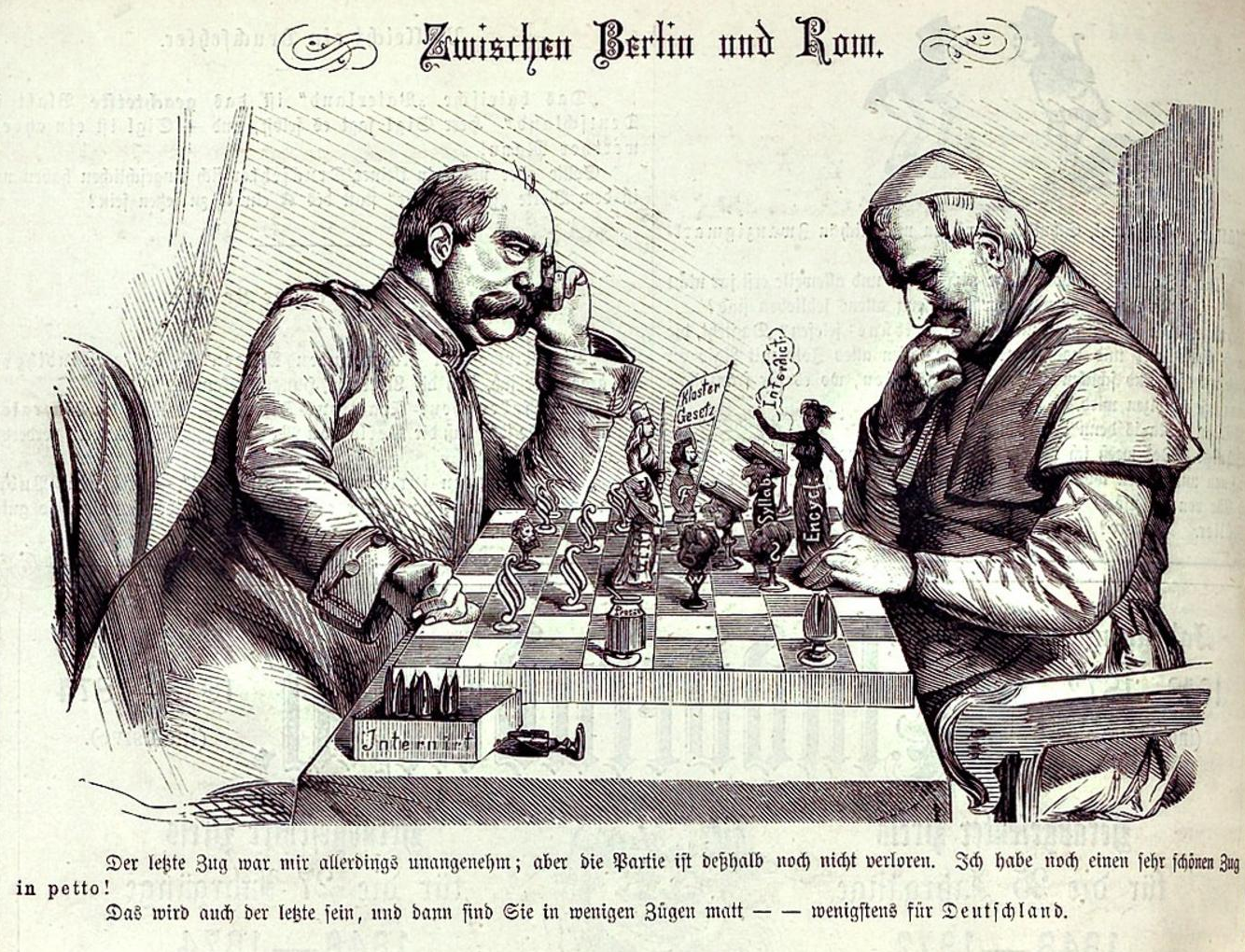
"Between Berlin and Rome", with Bismarck on the left and the Pope on the right, from the German satirical magazine Kladderadatsch, 1875. Pope: "Admittedly, the last move was unpleasant for me, but the game still isn't lost. I still have a very beautiful secret move." Bismarck: "That will also be the last one, and then you'll be mated in a few moves – at least in Germany."

From 1871 to 1876, the Prussian state parliament and the federal legislature (Reichstag), both with liberal majorities, enacted 22 laws in the context of the Kulturkampf. They were mainly directed against clerics: bishops, priests and religious orders (anti-clerical) and enforced the supremacy of the state over the church. While several laws were specific to the Catholic Church (Jesuits, congregations, etc.) the general laws affected both Catholic and Protestant churches. In an attempt to overcome increasing resistance by the Catholic Church and its defiance of the laws, new regulations increasingly went beyond state matters, referring to the purely internal affairs of the church. Even many liberals saw them as an encroachment on civil liberties, compromising their own credo.

Constitutionally, education and regulation of religious affairs were vested in the federal states and the leading actor of the Kulturkampf was Prussia, Germany's largest state; however, some of the laws were also passed by the Reichstag and applied to all of Germany. In general, the laws did not affect the press and associations, including Catholic ones.

=== 1871 ===
- 8 June: Fusion of Catholic and Protestant sections in the Prussian Ministry of Culture (responsible for religious matters). The Catholic section had been installed in 1840. The reason given for the merger was that "the exclusively political attitude of equal justice to all" was to be adopted and that, for that purpose, one ecclesiastical department was required. The merger was also a precondition for the School Supervision Act of the following year.
- 10 December: Passing of the Pulpit Law (Kanzelparagraph) at the initiative of Bavaria and meant to curb what was considered the misuse of religious sermons for political agitation from the pulpit. The law read: "Any cleric or other minister of religion shall be punished with imprisonment or incarceration of up to two years if he, while exercising his occupation or having his occupation exercised, makes state affairs the subject of announcements or discussion either in public before a crowd, in a church, or before any number of people in some other place designated for religious gatherings in such a way that it endangers the public peace."

=== 1872 ===
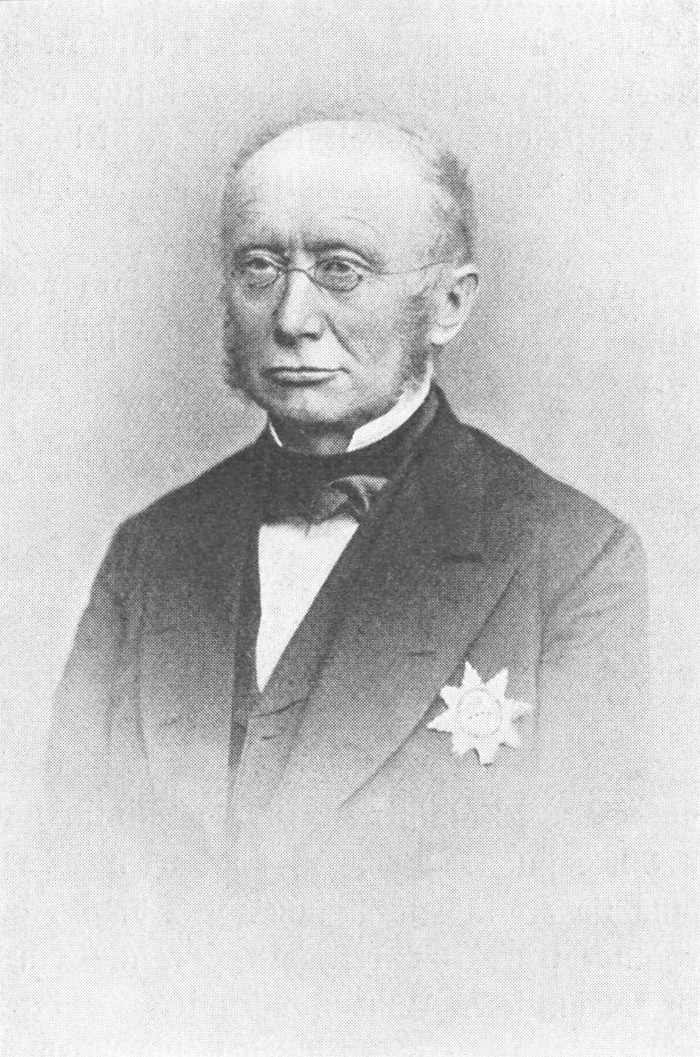
Ludwig Windthorst, 1872

- 22 January: Adalbert Falk became Prussian minister for spiritual, educational and health matters.
- 11 March: Prussian School Supervision Act (Schulaufsichtsgesetz). This legislation was at the heart of the Kulturkampf, abolishing church oversight of the Prussian primary school system (Catholic and Protestant), excluding the clergy from education and eliminating its influence in curricular matters. This was a milestone for liberalism, as placing education into the hands of the government had always been at the top of its agenda. Liberals believed it would create an open-minded and neutral system of education, seen as the prerequisite for a progressive society. In the eyes of Bismarck, this law was necessary after the church supposedly put itself in opposition to the state and used the schools to incite the young against the government.
- April: The Holy See rejected Gustav Adolf, Cardinal Prince of Hohenlohe-Schillingsfürst as German ambassador to the Holy See. Schillingsfürst had been critical of the infallibility dogma but eventually accepted the decision of the council. Therefore, Bismarck took him for a suitable mediator. In response to the rejection, the diplomatic mission was left vacant and Prussia suspended relations with the Holy See in December 1872.
- 4 July: German Empire, Jesuit Law banning of the Jesuits who were seen as the emissaries of Rome and the spearhead of ultramontanism. By acknowledging the supremacy of Papal authority, the Jesuits were accused of contesting the secular authority. The law allowed for the dissolution of all Jesuit chapters and the expulsion of their members. The following year, the law was extended to closely related orders: the Redemptorists, Lazarists, Fathers of the Holy Ghost, and the Ladies of the Sacred Heart. Continued and increasing Church resistance and contempt of the 1871/1872 laws led to changes in the constitution and the enactment of further laws. In order to facilitate these laws, the Prussian Constitution was amended.
- 20 September: The Prussian bishops, at a conference in Fulda, protested against the regulations hostile to the church.
- 23 December: The pope, in an address to his cardinals, denounced the new laws as persecution of the church.

=== 1873 ===
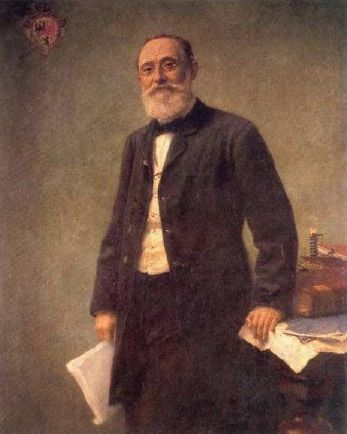
Rudolf Virchow, 1861

- 17 January: The term Kulturkampf comes into use. Debating the law on education conditions for the employment of clerics, a Progressive deputy in the Prussian legislature – the distinguished medical scientist and pioneer of public health methods, Rudolf Virchow said: Ich habe die Überzeugung, es handelt sich hier um einen großen Kulturkampf ("I am of the conviction that this is about a great cultural struggle"). He repeated this term in a call for a vote by the German Progress Party on 23 March 1873. It was ironically picked up and derided in the Catholic press and enthusiastically defended in the liberal press.
- 30 January: While the laws were being debated in parliament, the Prussian bishops submitted a protest against the planned legislation and in a memorial, they announced their opposition to the new laws.
- 5 April: Prussia, Amendment of Sections 15, 16 and 18 of the Prussian Constitution:
  - In section 15, the sentence "The Protestant and the Roman Catholic Church, as well as every other religious community, regulates and administers its affairs independently" is supplemented by "but remain subject to the laws of the state and its legally regulated superintendence". It is added that the same applies to the possession or beneficial use of institutions for religion, teaching, charity, endowments and funds.
  - Section 16, regarding the unrestricted dealings of religious communities with their seniors and public announcements according to general regulations, was cancelled.
  - Section 18 cancelled the state's right to appoint, nominate, elect or confirm clerics for a post. But the amendment added that the state could regulate the minimum education required for clerical posts, the appointment and dismissal of clergymen and servicemen of religion, and define the limits of ecclesiastical disciplinary measures.
- 2 May: The bishops issued a common pastoral letter explaining to the faithful the necessity to unanimously and passively resist these laws.
- 11–14 May: Four "May Laws" were passed in 1873 and were enacted on 11–14 May that year.
- 26 May: The bishops issued another pastoral letter calling on the faithful to resist the new laws and informed the Prussian government that they would not cooperate in their execution. Parish councils declined to elect new pastors or accept parish administrators. Exiled or imprisoned bishops used underground networks. The bishops of Münster and Paderborn refused the Kulturexamen for their seminaries and appointed priests without notifying authorities. Clergy obeying the mandate of the bishops immediately became subject to the punishments prescribed by the laws. Fines were imposed in hundreds of cases and the clerics resisted paying, at which, in turn, the government resorted to force, either by confiscation or imprisonment of up to two years.
- 21 November: In his encyclical Etsi multa on the persecution of the Church in Italy, Germany, and Switzerland, the pope wrote of Germany "No wonder, then, that the former religious tranquility has been gravely disturbed in that Empire by this kind of law and other plans and actions of the Prussian government most hostile to the Church. But who would wish to falsely cast the blame of this disturbance on the Catholics of the German Empire!" He claimed that Freemasonry was the motivating force behind the Kulturkampf.

==== May Laws ====
The Falk Laws, also called May Laws (Maigesetze), were a set of laws passed by the Prussian parliament in the years 1873, 1874, and 1875. Four laws passed in 1873 were enacted on 11–14 May that year:

1. Law on religious disaffiliation allowing a person to sever his connection with the church by simple declaration before a secular judge. This declaration freed him from all civil effects of belonging to a church, especially ecclesiastical dues.

2. Law on ecclesiastical disciplinary measures restricting the exercise of ecclesiastical punishments and means of discipline directed against the life, property, freedom or honour of citizens. This included the infliction of the great excommunication if proclaimed with the name of the guilty, because of possible disturbances of civil and social intercourse. Thus, disciplinary measures were almost totally restricted to the spiritual realm (see state Monopoly on violence).

3. Ecclesiastical disciplinary law concerning ecclesiastical power of discipline and the establishment of The Royal Court of Justice for Ecclesiastical Affairs. This subordinated the Catholic Church to state jurisdiction not only in external but also in internal matters. The law regulated the exercise of disciplinary power by church authorities against their officers for special violation of their duties. Members of the court had to be Germans residing in Germany. Bodily chastisement by the Church was entirely forbidden, fines were limited to maximum amounts, restrictions of freedom could only consist in banishment to a church institution within Germany no longer than 3 months and not against the will of the person concerned. On the other hand, the new court was also given jurisdiction over ecclesiastical officers in violation of state laws.

With this law, the German clergy was to be exempt from any juridical body outside of the nation. Hence, judgments of the Holy See or the Roman Rota would not be binding upon them. The highest court was made up of Prussian ecclesiastics, all appointed with the permission of Prussian civil authorities. The Church's juridical and punitive powers were restricted by allowing clerics, e.g. those punished by the Church for not resisting the Kulturkampf laws, to appeal to the Royal Court of Justice for Ecclesiastical Affairs. Bishops in defiance of this law could be deposed.

4. Education standards and civic registry law concerning the education and appointment of priests. Regarding the Protestant Church, these regulations had already been in force for a long time. All men intended for the priesthood needed a graduate degree (Abitur) from a German gymnasium and to study 3 years of theology at a German university.

All appointments of clerics had to be approved by the state. Herewith, training and appointment of the clergy came under state supervision. The traditional regimen of clerical study was to be replaced by a modern education in a liberal German institution, thus ensuring that candidates to the priesthood were imbued with the spirit of secularism. Furthermore, ecclesiastical offices could only be filled with the permission of the highest civil authority in each province, essentially reviving the ancient practice of lay investiture.

=== 1874 ===
- 9 March: Prussian Civil Registry Law (birth, marriage, death). The same law was passed for the whole empire on 6 February 1875.
- 4 May: Imperial Expatriation Law was meant to curb the exercise of church duties by clerics without the required consent of authorities. The law stipulated that in such cases, after a final conviction, a cleric would be banned from his parish or sent to another place within the empire and, in case of reoccurrence, that the cleric would be expatriated and expelled.
- 20 May: Prussian Law on the administration of vacant bishoprics. According to the law of 11 May 1873, administrators were to be elected for vacant bishoprics, authorizing laymen to assume administrative responsibilities at the parish level. This additional law stipulated that should an administrator not be elected according to the law, the property would be managed by a state superintendent.
- 13 July: In the town of Bad Kissingen, Eduard Kullmann attempted to assassinate Bismarck with a pistol, but only hit his hand. Kullmann cited church laws as the reason for his attempt; he was sentenced to 14 years of Zuchthaus (correctional facilities with harsh forced labour). The assassination attempt led to an intensification of the Kulturkampf measures.

=== 1875 ===
- 5 February: The encyclical Quod Nunquam (That Never) declared that the May Laws were invalid, "insofar as they totally oppose the divine order of the Church." The Catholic newspaper Westfälischer Merkur was the first to publish the whole text on the 18th of the same month in Germany. All the following papers publishing the encyclical were confiscated.
- 22 April: The Prussian Payment Law (Breadbasket Law) stopped government subsidies and payments for the Catholic bishoprics and clerics unless they signed a declaration of adherence to all laws.
- 31 May: Prussian Congregations Law dissolving all orders within 6 months except those involved in care for the infirm. For teaching orders, the time could be extended.
- 20 June: Prussian Church Finances Administration Law providing for a representation and a council elected by the parish for the administration of property.
- 4 July: Prussian Old-Catholic Church Entitlement Law giving Old-Catholic communities of a certain size the right to use Catholic churches and cemeteries.

=== 1876 ===
The last two laws passed in 1876 were of no practical importance:

- 26 February: The possible punishment for violation of the pulpit law was extended to publications.
- 7 June: The State Supervision Act provided for government supervision of all church assets in the Catholic dioceses in Prussia.

== Mitigation and Peace Laws, 1878–1887 ==
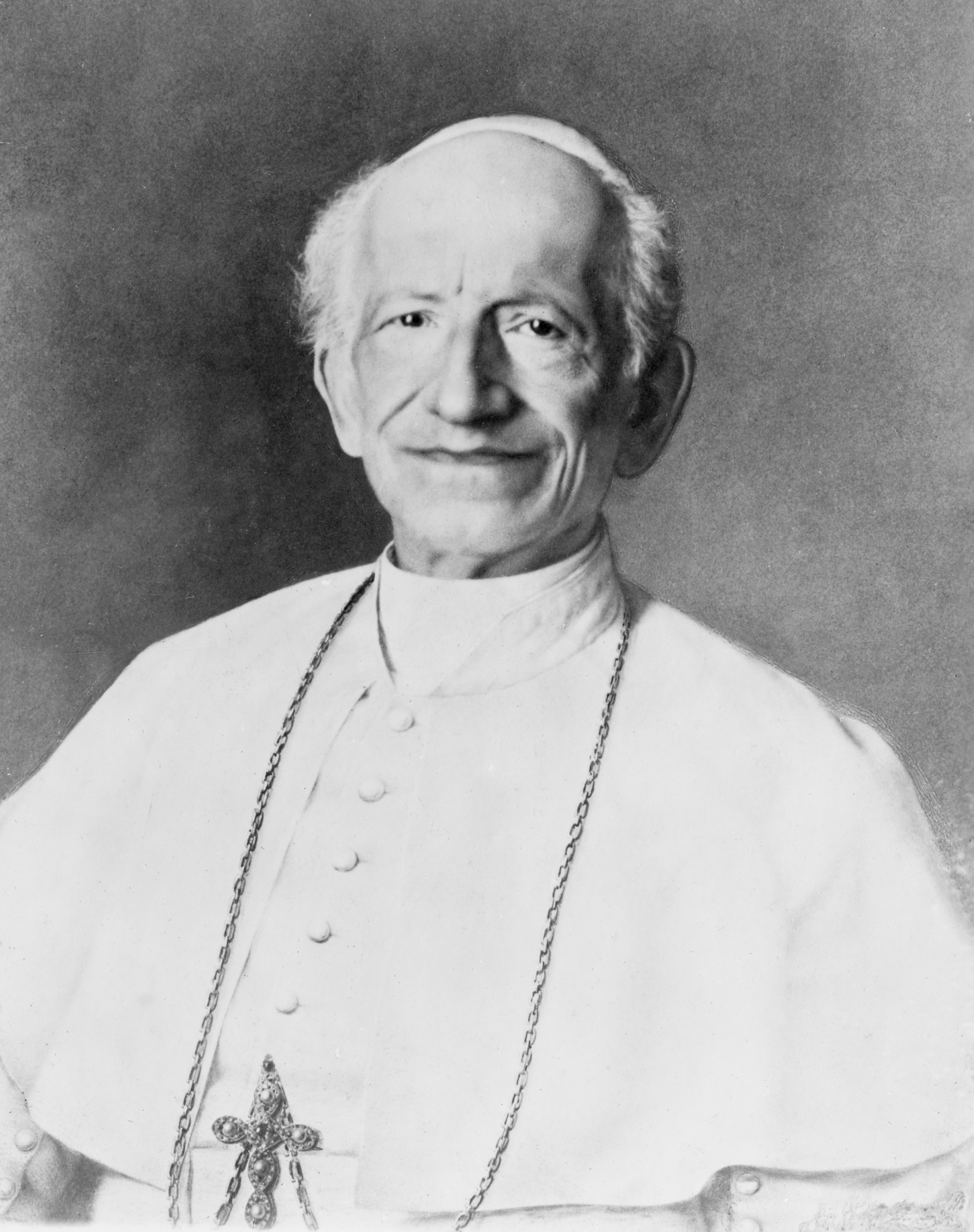
Pope Leo XIII (c. 1898)

Austria accepted German unification under Prussian leadership and formed the Dual Alliance with Germany in 1879. The possibility of a war with France or Russia also became more remote. Therefore, Bismarck's attention gradually turned to the threatening popularity of the socialists and to questions of import duties. In these matters, he could either not rely on the support of the liberals to pursue his goals or they were not sufficient to form a majority. Bismarck had not been comfortable with the increasing ferocity of the Kulturkampf. Concerning the rise of the Centre Party, the laws had proven to be greatly ineffective and even counterproductive. He soon realized that they were of no help battling the Centre Party and as far as the separation of state and church was concerned, he had achieved more than he wanted.

In order to garner support for his Anti-Socialist Laws and protective trade tariffs, Bismarck turned his back on the liberals in search of new alliances. The death of Pius IX on 7 February 1878 opened the door for a settlement with the Catholic Church. The new pope Leo XIII was pragmatic and conciliatory. He expressed his wish for peace in a letter to the German emperor on the very day of his election, followed by a second letter in a similar vein that same year. Bismarck and the Pope entered into direct negotiations without the participation of the Church or the Reichstag, yet initially without much success. It came to pass that Falk, vehemently resented by Catholics, resigned on 14 July 1879, which could be read as a peace offering to the Vatican. A decisive boost only came in February 1880, when the Vatican unexpectedly agreed to the civic registry of clerics. As the Kulturkampf slowly wound down, the talks led to a number of mitigation and peace laws which were passed until 1887.

- July 1880: The First Mitigation Law reallowed government payments to Prussian dioceses and freed the bishops from swearing allegiance to the Prussian laws. Hereupon, four new bishops were installed where sees had been left vacant after the death of the incumbents. Catholic associations involved in the care of the infirm were readmitted.
- 1882: Resumption of diplomatic relations between Prussia (not Germany) and the Vatican, which had been cut in 1872.
- 31 May 1882: The Second Mitigation Law allowed the waiver of government exams for clerics.
- July 1883: The Third Mitigation Law legalized all religious actions of bishops and in certain cases, the king could pardon deposed bishops. 280 expelled clerics were pardoned.

On 29 September 1885, as another sign of peace, Bismarck proposed the Pope as arbiter in a dispute with Spain about the Caroline Islands and accepted his verdict in favour of Spain. In gratitude but to the great horror of Catholics, the Pope awarded Bismarck the Supreme Order of Christ, the highest order of chivalry to be granted by the Holy See. Bismarck was the only Protestant ever to receive this award. After further negotiations between Prussia and the Vatican, the Prussian parliament passed 2 additional laws amending some of the Kulturkampf laws.

- 21 May 1886: The First Peace Law amended some of the regulations in the education standards and civic registry law of 11 May 1873; state exams for clerics (waiver in Second Mitigation Law of 31 May 1882) were totally abolished. Episcopal-theological academies and seminaries, as well as theological studies at these institutions, were readmitted. Students were allowed to be quartered in Catholic boarding houses (Konvikte). The state acknowledged papal disciplinary powers and abolished the Royal Court of Justice for Ecclesiastical Affairs.
- 26 April 1887: The Second Peace Law readmitted all orders except the Jesuits to Prussia.

On 23 May 1887, the Pope declared, "The struggle which damaged the church and was of no good to the state is now over". The Mitigation and Peace Laws restored the inner autonomy of the Catholic church while leaving key regulations and the laws concerning separation of church and state in place (civic marriage, civic registry, religious disaffiliation, government school supervision, civic registry of clerics, ban of Jesuits, pulpit law, state supervision of church assets, constitutional amendments and the Catholic section in the Ministry of Culture was not reintroduced). The respective opposing parties in the Reichstag harshly criticized the concessions made by the Vatican and the Prussian government. Windthorst and the Centre Party were dismayed at being sidelined and not being consulted about the concessions the pope made, e.g. about the ban on Jesuits or the civil registry of clerics. None of the party's major demands were met. Instead, the pope even sided with Bismarck on non-religious issues and pressured the Centre Party to support Bismarck or at least abstain, e.g. in the matter of the hotly debated Septennat 1887 (7-year military budget). Many Liberals, especially Falk, objected to the concessions Bismarck made to the Church. The growth of the Centre Party has been considered a major setback for Bismarck, although never publicly conceded. In spite of strong Catholic representation in the Reichstag, the political power and influence of the Church in the public sphere and its political power was greatly reduced. Although Germany and the Vatican were officially at peace after 1878, religious conflicts and tensions continued. At the turn of the century, Pope Pius X announced the encyclical Pascendi dominici gregis, mounting new attacks on historical criticism of biblical texts and any accommodation of Catholicism to modern philosophy, sociology or literature. As of 1910, clerics had to take an oath against all forms of modernism, a requirement later extended to teachers of the Catholic religion at schools and professors of Catholic theology, resulting in intense political and public debates and new conflicts with the state.

== Effects and impact ==
The abolition of the Catholic section of the Prussian Ministry of Ecclesiastical and Educational Affairs deprived Catholics of their voice at the highest level. The system of strict government supervision of schools was applied only in Catholic areas; the Protestant schools were left alone. The school politics also alienated Protestant conservatives and churchmen. The British ambassador Odo Russell reported to London in October 1872 how Bismarck's plans were backfiring by strengthening the ultramontane (pro-papal) position inside German Catholicism: "The German Bishops who were politically powerless in Germany and theologically in opposition to the Pope in Rome – have now become powerful political leaders in Germany and enthusiastic defenders of the now infallible Faith of Rome, united, disciplined, and thirsting for martyrdom, thanks to Bismarck's uncalled for antiliberal declaration of War on the freedom they had hitherto peacefully enjoyed."

Nearly all German bishops, clergy and laymen rejected the legality of the new laws and were defiantly facing the increasingly heavy penalties, trials and imprisonments. As of 1878, only three of eight Prussian dioceses still had bishops, some 1,125 of 4,600 parishes were vacant, and nearly 1,800 priests ended up in jail or in exile, nearly half the monks and nuns had left Prussia and a third of the monasteries and convents were closed. Between 1872 and 1878, numerous Catholic newspapers were confiscated, Catholic associations and assemblies were dissolved, and Catholic civil servants were dismissed merely on the pretence of having Ultramontane sympathies. Thousands of laypeople were imprisoned for assisting priests in evading the punitive new laws.

The general ideological enthusiasm for the Kulturkampf, particularly among liberals, was in contrast to Bismarck's pragmatic attitude towards the measures, as well as the growing disquiet from the Conservatives. Apart from the outspoken criticism of the Kulturkampf Laws by the Catholic Church and the Centre Party, there were also a number of Liberals and Protestants who voiced concern at least at the Kampfgesetze (battle laws). "Unease concerning the effects of his programme continued to spread among all but the most bigoted priest-haters and the most doctrinaire liberals". Such noted critics outside the Catholic camp were Friedrich Heinrich Geffcken, Emil Albert Friedberg or Julius von Kirchmann. Although they were proponents of state superiority, they regarded some of the laws as either ineffective or as interference in internal church affairs and not consistent with liberal values. Geffcken wrote that "with the intention to emancipate the laity from the hierarchy, the main body of the Catholics was brought in phalanx into the hands of leaders from which it was to be wrested. But the state cannot fight at length against a third of the population; it has no means to break such a passive resistance supported and organized by religious fanaticism. If a statesman desists from the correctness of a measure, it only matters that he has the power to enforce it." Even Bismarck – who initially saw a variety of tactical political advantages in these measures, e.g. for his suppressive policies against the Polish population – took pains to distance himself from the rigours of their enforcement."

The Kulturkampf law was considered the harshest and, with no equivalent in Europe, was the Expatriation Law. Passed by a liberal majority in parliament, it stipulated banishment as a punishment that all civilized peoples considered the harshest, beyond the death penalty. As to the Centre Party, these measures did not have the effect that Bismarck had in mind. In the state elections of November 1873, it grew from 50 to 90 seats and in the Reichstag elections from 63 to 91. The number of Catholic periodicals also increased; in 1873 there were about 120. The Kulturkampf gave secularists and socialists an opportunity to attack all religions, an outcome that distressed the Protestant leaders and especially Bismarck himself, who was a devout pietistic Protestant.

In the face of systematic defiance, the Bismarck government increased the penalties and its attacks, and was challenged in 1875 when a papal encyclical declared that the entire ecclesiastical legislation of Prussia was invalid, and threatened to excommunicate any Catholic who obeyed. There was no violence, but the Catholics mobilized their support, set up numerous civic organizations, raised money to pay fines and rallied behind their church and the Center Party. To Bismarck's surprise, the Conservative Party — especially the Junkers from his own landowning class in East Prussia — sided with the Catholics. They were Protestants and did not like the Pope, but they had much in common with the Center Party. The Conservatives controlled their local schools and did not want bureaucrats from Berlin to take them over. They were hostile to the liberals, being fearful of free trade that would put them in competition with the United States and other grain exporters, and disliking their secular views. In the Prussian legislature, they sided with the Center Party on the school issue. Bismarck was livid, and he resigned the premiership of Prussia (while remaining Chancellor of the German Empire), telling an ally, "In domestic affairs, I have lost the ground that is for me acceptable through the unpatriotic treason of the Conservative Party in the Catholic question." Indeed, many of Bismarck's conservative friends were in opposition. So too was Kaiser William I, who was King of Prussia; he was strongly opposed to the civil marriage component of the Kulturkampf.

The Kulturkampf made Catholics more resolute; they responded not with violence but with votes, and as the newly formed Center Party became a major force in the Imperial Parliament, it gained support from non-Catholic minorities who felt threatened by Bismarck's centralization of power. In the long run, the most significant result was the mobilization of the Catholic voters through the Center Party, and their insistence on protecting their church. According to Margaret Anderson, "The effort was perceived, and not only by its opponents, as aiming at nothing less than the forcible assimilation of the Catholic Church and its adherents to the values and norms of the empire's Protestant majority [...] [it led] Catholics – young and old, male and female, cleric and lay, big men and small – to cleave to their priests and defy the legislation." After the Center party had doubled its popular vote in the elections of 1874, it became the second largest party in the national parliament, and remained a powerful force for the next 60 years. It became difficult for Bismarck to form a government without their support. From the decades-long experience in battling against the Kulturkampf, the Catholics of Germany learned democracy, according to Margaret Anderson. She states that the clergy "[a]cquired a pragmatic, but real, commitment to democratic elections, parliamentary procedures, and party politics – commitments in which they schooled their flock, by their practice as much as by their preaching."

=== Anti-Polish aspect of Kulturkampf ===
Studies that analyze the nationalist aspect of Kulturkampf point out its anti-Polish character and Bismarck's attempt to Germanise Polish provinces in the German Empire. The Poles had already suffered from discrimination and numerous oppressive measures in Germany long before unification. These measures were intensified after the German Empire was formed, and Bismarck was known to be particularly hostile towards the Poles. Christopher Clark argues that Prussian policy changed radically in the 1870s in the face of highly visible Polish support for France in the Franco-Prussian war. Polish demonstrations made clear the Polish nationalist feeling, and calls were also made for Polish recruits to desert from the Prussian Army – though these went unheeded. Bismarck was outraged, telling the Prussian cabinet in 1871: "From the Russian border to the Adriatic Sea we are confronted with the combined propaganda of Slavs, ultramontanes, and reactionaries, and it is necessary openly to defend our national interests and our language against such hostile actions." Therefore, in the Province of Posen the Kulturkampf took on a much more nationalistic character than in other parts of Germany.

Not an adamant supporter of the Liberals' general Kulturkampf goals, Bismarck did recognize the potential in some of them for subduing Polish national aspirations and readily made use of it. While the Liberals' main objective was the separation of state and church as essential for a democratic and liberal society, Bismarck saw its use in separating the Polish population from the only supporter and guardian of its national identity. Prussian authorities imprisoned 185 priests and forced hundreds of others into exile. Among the imprisoned was the Primate of Poland Archbishop Mieczysław Ledóchowski. A large part of the remaining Catholic priests had to continue their service in hiding from the authorities. Although most of the 185 imprisoned were finally set free by the end of the decade, those who were released emigrated. The anti-Polish aspects of the Kulturkampf remained in place in Polish provinces of the German Empire until the First World War.

== In other countries ==
=== Austria ===
The Kulturkampf in Austria has roots dating back to the 18th century. Emperor Joseph II launched a religious policy (later called "Josephinism") that advocated the supremacy of the state in religious matters. This resulted in far-reaching state control over the Catholic Church, including the reorganization of dioceses, the regulation of the number of masses, the transfer of many schools into government hands, state-controlled seminaries, and the limitation of the number of clerics and the dissolution of numerous monasteries. Protests of Pope Pius VI, and even his visit to Vienna in 1782, were to no avail. In the Concordat of 1855, which was the culmination of Catholic influence in Austria, many of the Catholic Church's previous rights that had been taken away under Joseph II were restored (marriage, partial control of censorship, elementary and secondary education, full control of the clergy and religious funds). In 1868 and 1869, after sanctioning from the December constitution, Emperor Francis Joseph's newly appointed cabinet undid parts of the Concordat by way of several liberal reforms. These reforms are referred to as the May Laws. Against strong protests from the Catholic Church, the laws of 25 May 1868 and 14 May 1869 restored civil marriage, passed primary and secondary education into government hands, installed interconfessional schools, and regulated interconfessional relations (for example, mixed marriages and children's rights to choose their faith).

In a secret consistory, Pope Pius IX condemned the constitution of 1867 and the May Laws as leges abominabiles. In a pastoral letter dated 7 September 1868, bishop Franz-Josef Rudigier called for resistance to these May Laws; however, the letter was confiscated, and Rudigier had to appear before the court on 5 June 1869. This event led to the first-ever public demonstrations by the Catholic population. On 12 July 1869, the bishop was sentenced to a jail term of two weeks, but he was later pardoned by the emperor. The May Laws provoked a serious conflict between state and church. After the promulgation of papal infallibility in 1870, Austria abrogated the Concordat of 1855 and abolished it entirely in 1874. In May 1874, the Religious Act was officially recognised.

=== Switzerland ===
In Switzerland, the Kulturkampf (represented as the "Investiture Controversy of the 19th century" by historian Peter Stadler) was a period of intense religious and political confrontation. It was a struggle between political liberalism and anticlerical radicalism on one side, and the Catholic Church and political Catholicism on the other. The conflict was part of a broader European process of secularisation and modernisation, as the new nation-state sought to emancipate itself from centuries-old ties between the Church and political power.

==== Origins and the "Pre-Kulturkampf" (1830–1864) ====
The roots of the Swiss conflict extend back to the Enlightenment and the Helvetic Republic, but a distinct polarization began in the 1830s during the Regeneration. This period saw the rise of liberal philosophy, which was condemned by the 1832 encyclical Mirari vos. This tension inspired the Articles of Baden in 1834. Throughout the 1840s, the antagonism intensified with the affair of the Argovian convents, the recall of the Jesuits to Lucerne in 1844, the volunteer corps expeditions, and the Sonderbund War. The subsequent foundation of the federal state in 1848 resulted in a Catholic community divided between a marginalized conservative majority and a few radicals in leadership positions. This climate favoured the rapid progression of ultramontanism, which prioritized the authority of the Pope.

Between 1848 and 1860, several cantonal conflicts prefigured the national crisis. In Fribourg, Bishop Etienne Marilley defended Church privileges against the radical government; his refusal to unconditionally swear to the 1848 Constitution led to his incarceration and exile in France until 1856. In St. Gallen, the radical government suppressed denominational secondary schools in 1855 and founded a mixed cantonal school in 1856 to limit Church influence. In Ticino, the "Civil Ecclesiastical Law" of 1855 subjected clergy activities to state control, while in Bern, measures were taken to remove Catholic sisters from schools in the Bernese Jura. In 1862, Zurich suppressed the Rheinau Abbey. The publication of the encyclical Quanta cura and the Syllabus of Errors in 1864, which rejected reconciliation with "progress, liberalism, and modern civilisation," turned these localised tensions into an open ideological war.

==== Peak of the conflict (1871–1874) ====
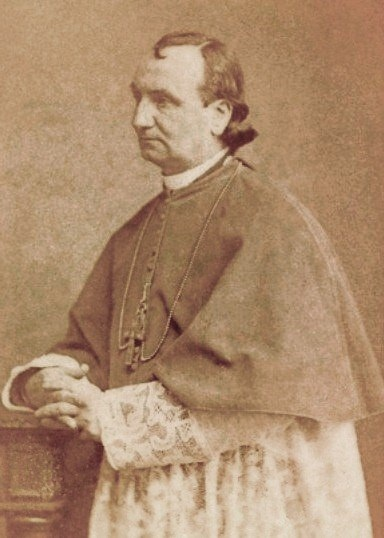
Bishop Gaspard Mermillod, whose appointment as Vicar Apostolic of Geneva led to his expulsion from Switzerland in 1873

The true Kulturkampf erupted following the First Vatican Council, which defined Papal infallibility. Although Bishop Carl Johann Greith of St. Gallen attempted to interpret the dogma restrictively to de-escalate tensions, a group of liberal-aligned Catholics broke away to form the Christian Catholic Church of Switzerland. This schism provided political radicals with the opportunity to escalate the conflict during the revision of the Swiss Federal Constitution. Two major events served as catalysts: in 1872, Bishop Eugène Lachat of Basel excommunicated the priest Paulin Gschwind for refusing the new dogma, and in 1873, the Pope appointed Gaspard Mermillod as Vicar Apostolic of Geneva without government notification.

The radical governments of the cantons belonging to the Diocese of Basel (excluding Zug and Lucerne) responded by destituting Bishop Eugène Lachat in 1873. Simultaneously, the Federal Council expelled Mermillod from Switzerland. The Bernese government revoked the mandates of priests in the Jura who supported Lachat and eventually expelled them from the canton in January 1874, implementing a law that required the democratic election of parish priests. Following Pope Pius IX's condemnation of these acts in the 1873 encyclical Etsi multa, the Federal Council severed diplomatic relations with the Holy See and expelled the Apostolic Nuncio from his residence in Lucerne. The Federal Constitution of 1874 was subsequently accepted with Special Provisions directed specifically against the Catholic Church.

The intensity varied by region. In the Bernese Jura, the Catholic population engaged in passive resistance despite the presence of federal troops. In Bern, the Church of Saints-Pierre-et-Paul was granted to the Christian Catholics. In Geneva, the state expelled teaching orders and took control of ecclesiastical affairs. In Zurich, Roman Catholics were forced to cede the Augustine Church to the Christian Catholics. In St. Gallen and Solothurn, the conflict highlighted internal Catholic splits; liberal Catholics like Matthias Hungerbühler remained within the Roman Church but opposed the creation of the Christian Catholic Church, differing from figures like Augustin Keller who supported the schism.

==== Resolution and impact ====
The conflict began to ebb after 1874 once the radicals' primary demands — the creation of the civil state registry, the provision for secular funerals, and the secularisation of public education — were satisfied. The Christian Catholic Church failed to gain mass appeal despite support from the governments of Bern, Aargau, and Solothurn. Within the Catholic camp, conciliatory leaders like Philipp Anton von Segesser gained prominence. The 1873 economic crisis and the rise of the social question also diverted political energy away from religious disputes.

The election of Pope Leo XIII in 1878 marked a turning point. Under his papacy, negotiations with federal councillors Emil Welti and Louis Ruchonnet led to normalisation. In 1878, the exiled Jura priests were allowed to return to their parishes after the Church accepted the democratic election of curates. In Geneva, the situation was resolved when Mermillod was named Bishop of Lausanne and Geneva with a seat in Fribourg. Bishop Lachat was appointed as the Apostolic Administrator for Ticino in 1884, allowing the conciliatory Friedrich Fiala to take over the Diocese of Basel in 1885.

By 1885, the Kulturkampf had largely ended, though a final skirmish occurred in 1882 over a proposed federal school secretary (derisively called the "school bailiff" or Schulvogt), which was rejected by voters. The 1891 election of Josef Zemp to the Federal Council signalled the integration of Catholics into the federal state; however, the cultural and denominational divisions persisted for decades, resurfacing during the Jura question and in the late-20th century votes to repeal the Jesuit ban (1973) and the article on dioceses (2001).

== Kulturkampf in contemporary usage ==
=== United States ===
In the late 19th century, cultural wars arose over issues of prohibition and education in the United States. The Bennett Law was a highly controversial state law passed in Wisconsin in 1889 that required the use of English to teach major subjects in all public and private elementary and high schools. Because Wisconsin German Catholics and Lutherans each operated large numbers of parochial schools where German was used in the classroom, it was bitterly resented by German-American and some Norwegian communities. Although the law was ultimately repealed, there were significant political repercussions, with the Republicans losing the governorship and the legislature, and the election of Democrats to the Senate and House of Representatives.

In the United States, the term "culture war" has been used to refer to conflict in the late 20th and early 21st centuries between religious social conservatives and secular social liberals. This theme of "culture war" was the basis of Patrick Buchanan's keynote speech at the 1992 Republican National Convention. It has also been used to refer to neoconservative reaction to the New Left, and the ideological battles playing out in the country's public schools.

Throughout the 1980s, there were battles in Congress and the media regarding federal support for the National Endowment for the Arts and the National Endowment for the Humanities that amounted to a war over high culture between neoconservatives and paleoconservatives. Justice Antonin Scalia referenced the term in the Supreme Court case Romer v. Evans, 517 U.S. 620 (1996), saying "the Court has mistaken a Kulturkampf for a fit of spite". The case concerned an amendment to the Colorado state constitution that prohibited any subdepartment from acting to protect individuals on the basis of sexual orientation. Scalia believed that the amendment was a valid move on the part of citizens who sought "recourse to a more general and hence more difficult level of political decision making than others". The majority disagreed, holding that the amendment violated the Equal Protection Clause of the Fourteenth Amendment.

=== Israel ===
The term, translated to Hebrew as Milhemet Tarbut (מלחמת תרבות) is also frequently used, with similar connotations, in the political debates of Israel—having been introduced by Jews who fled Nazi Germany in the 1930s.

== See also ==
- Away from Rome!
- Culture war
- Expulsion of congregations (1880)
- Expulsion of congregations (1902–1903)
- Febronianism
- Freedom of religion
- Gallicanism
- Germany–Holy See relations
- Investiture Controversy
- Josephinism
- Kirchenkampf
- Know Nothing
- First School War in Belgium (1879–1884)
- Jules Ferry laws in France
- Pope Pius IX and Germany

== Bibliography ==
- Anderson, Margaret Lavinia (2000). Practicing democracy: Elections and political culture in Imperial Germany. Princeton University Press.
- Atkin, Nicholas; Tallett, Frank (2003). Priests, Prelates and People: A History of European Catholicism since 1750. Oxford University Press.
- Clark, Christopher (2007). Iron Kingdom: The Rise and Downfall of Prussia, 1600–1947. Penguin Books. ISBN 9780141904023.
- Clark, Christopher (2006). Iron Kingdom: The Rise and Downfall of Prussia, 1600–1947. Harvard University Press. ISBN 9780674023857.
- Gross, Michael B. (2005). The War against Catholicism: Liberalism and the Anti-Catholic Imagination in Nineteenth-Century Germany. University of Michigan Press. doi:10.3998/mpub.17623. ISBN 978-0472031306.
- Gross, Michael B. (2004). The War against Catholicism: Liberalism and the Anti-Catholic Imagination in Nineteenth-Century Germany. University of Michigan Press. ISBN 0-472-11383-6.
- Helmstadter, Richard, ed. (1997). Freedom and Religion in the 19th Century. Stanford University Press. ISBN 9780804730877.
- Lamberti, Marjorie (2001). "Religious conflicts and German national identity in Prussia, 1866–1914". In Dwyer, Philip G. (ed.). Modern Prussian History: 1830–1947. pp. 169–187.
- Pflanze, Otto (1990). Bismarck and the Development of Germany, Volume II: The Period of Consolidation, 1871–1880. Princeton University Press. ISBN 9781400861088.
- Pflanze, Otto (1971). Bismarck and the Development of Germany, Volume II: The Period of Consolidation, 1871–1880. Princeton University Press. ISBN 0-691-05587-4.
- Rabkin, Jeremy (Fall 1996). "A Supreme Court in the culture wars". The Public Interest (125). Archived from the original on 11 March 2007 – via Thomson-Gale.
- Robbins, Keith, ed. (2011). The Dynamics of Political Reform in Northern Europe 1780–1920: Political and Legal Perspectives. Leuven University Press. ISBN 9789058678256.
- Healy, Róisín (2003). The Jesuit Specter in Imperial Germany. Boston: Brill Publishers. ISBN 978-0391041943.
- Ruppert, Stefan (2002). Kirchenkampf und Kulturkampf: Historische Legitimation, politische Mitwirkung und wissenschaftliche Begleitung durch die Schule Emil Ludwig Richter. Tübingen: JCB Mohr Siebeck. ISBN 978-3-16-147868-0.
- Winkler, Heinrich August (2002). Der lange Weg nach Westen: Deutsche Geschichte vom Ende des Alten Reiches bis zum Untergang der Weimarer Republik (in German). Vol. 1. Munich: C. H. Beck. ISBN 3406460011.
- Winkler, Heinrich August (2000). Der lange Weg nach Westen: Deutsche Geschichte 1806–1933 (in German).
