= Jenkowice =

Jenkowice may refer to the following places in Poland:

- Jenkowice, Oleśnica County (in Gmina Oleśnica), Lower Silesian Voivodeship (SW Poland)
- Jenkowice, Gmina Kostomłoty in Środa County, Lower Silesian Voivodeship (SW Poland)
