= Chmielów =

Chmielów may refer to the following villages in Poland:

- Chmielów, Lower Silesian Voivodeship (south-west Poland)
- Chmielów, Lublin Voivodeship (east Poland)
- Chmielów, Subcarpathian Voivodeship (south-east Poland)
- Chmielów, Ostrowiec County in Świętokrzyskie Voivodeship (south-central Poland)
- Chmielów, Pińczów County in Świętokrzyskie Voivodeship (south-central Poland)
