= Bogdanów, Lower Silesian Voivodeship =

Bogdanów
- Village
- Location within Poland
- Coordinates: 51°0′26″N 16°34′29″E
- Country: Poland
- Voivodeship: Lower Silesian
- County: Środa
- Gmina: Kostomłoty

Bogdanów [bɔɡˈdanuf] is a village in the administrative district of Gmina Kostomłoty, within Środa County, Lower Silesian Voivodeship, in south-western Poland.
