= Sobkowice =

- Village
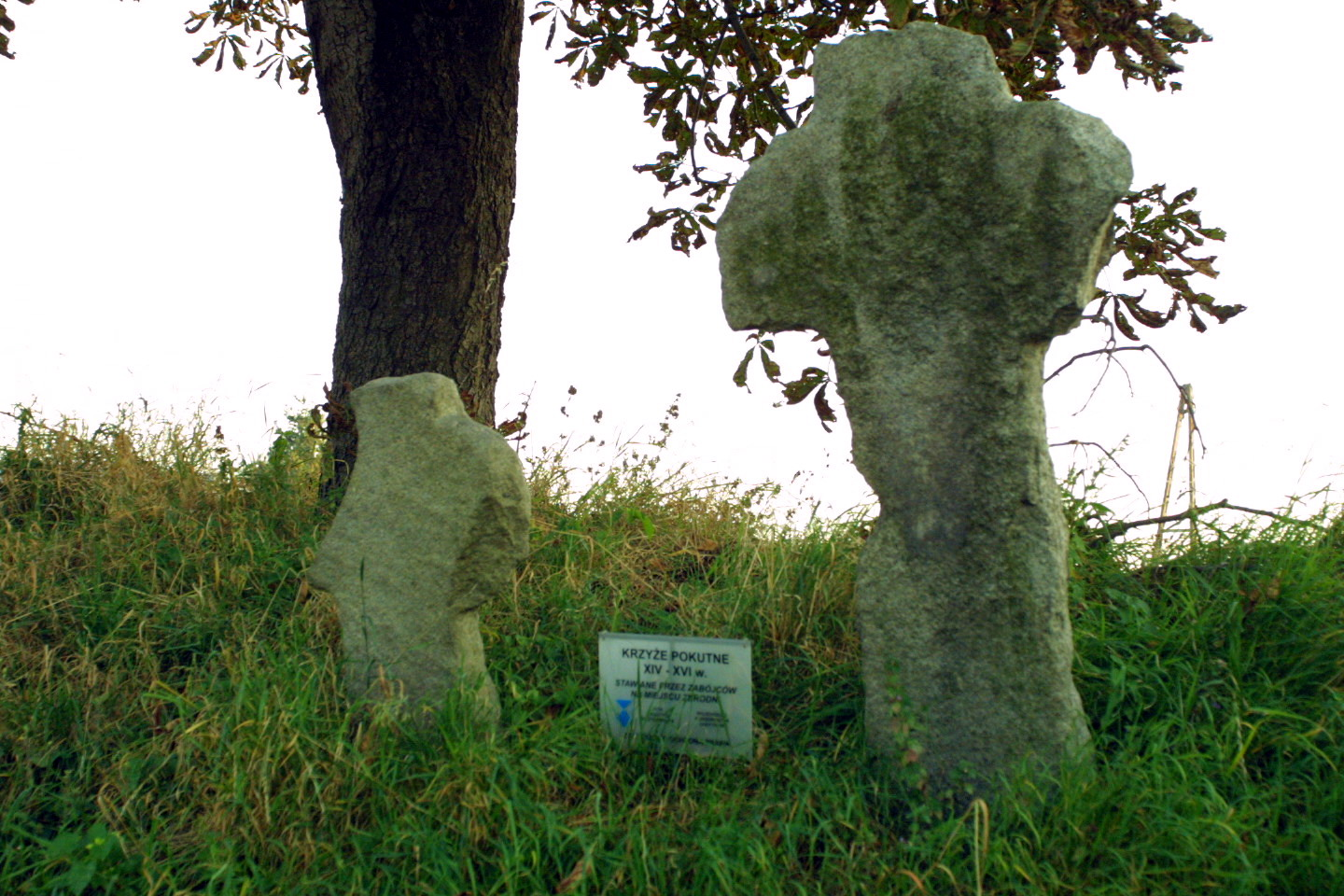
- Stone crosses

- Location within Poland
- Coordinates: 51°03′28″N 16°42′21″E
- Country: Poland
- Voivodeship: Lower Silesian
- County: Środa
- Gmina: Kostomłoty

Sobkowice [sɔpkɔˈvit͡sɛ] is a village in the administrative district of Gmina Kostomłoty, within Środa County, Lower Silesian Voivodeship, in south-western Poland.
