= Kostomłoty, Lower Silesian Voivodeship =

Kostomłoty
- Village
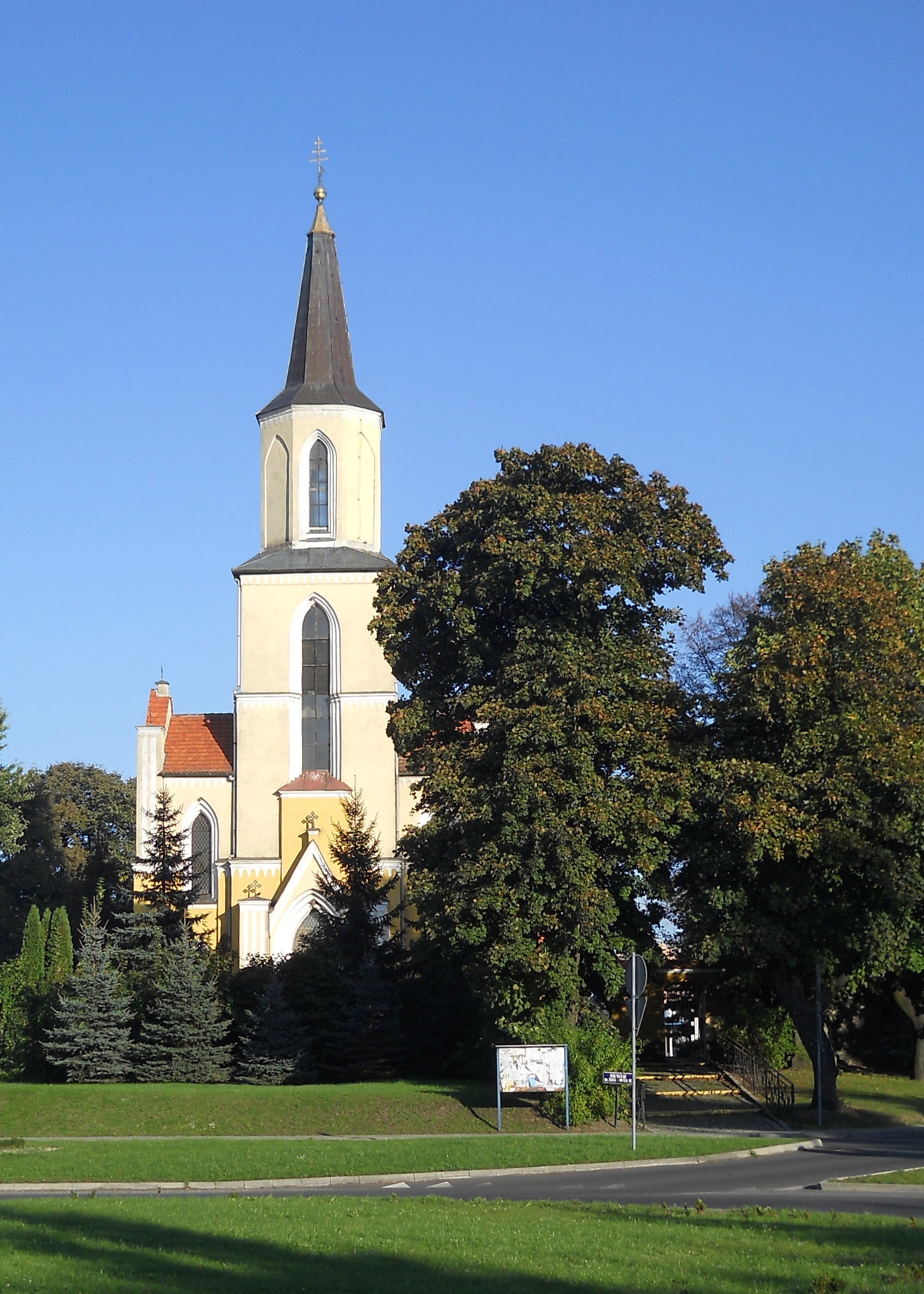
- Church of the Exaltation of the Holy Cross

- Location within Poland
- Coordinates: 51°3′N 16°37′E
- Country: Poland
- Voivodeship: Lower Silesian
- County: Środa
- Gmina: Kostomłoty
- Elevation: 150 m (490 ft)

Population (2021)
  - Total: 1,033
- Time zone: UTC+1 (CET)
  - Summer (DST): UTC+2 (CEST)
- Vehicle registration: DSR
- Website: http://www.kostomloty.pl

Kostomłoty [kɔstɔmˈwɔtɨ] is a village (former town) in Środa County, Lower Silesian Voivodeship, in south-western Poland. It is the seat of the administrative district (gmina) called Gmina Kostomłoty.

== Administrative division ==
In 1954–1972, the village belonged to and was the seat of the Kostomłoty Gromada. In the years 1975-1998 it administratively belonged to the Wrocław Voivodeship.

== Location ==
The 274 railway line runs to the south-west of Kostomłoty, the nearest station is located 12.5 kilometres (7.8 mi) to the east, in Kąty Wrocławskie.

== Etymology ==
The Polish name of the village is derived from the word kość (pl. bone) and młócić (pl. to thresh). The German name Kostenblut is the phonological adaptation of the earlier Slavic form. The existence of the phonologically similar German words kosten (to cost) and Blut (blood) played a role in adapting this name.

One of the first mentions of the village comes from a document from the year 1203, published by Cyprian, Bishop of Wrocław, in which it is mentioned in the Old Polish, Latinized form Costomlot.

The following spellings of the village's name were used throughout history:

- Forum Costinlot, 1149
- Costomlat, 1193
- civitas Costomlot, 1254
- Costenblut, 1284
- Kostenblut, 1614
- Kostomłoty, after 1945
