= Jakubkowice =

- Village
- Location within Poland
- Coordinates: 51°03′33″N 16°38′50″E
- Country: Poland
- Voivodeship: Lower Silesian
- County: Środa
- Gmina: Kostomłoty
- Population (approx.): 300

Jakubkowice [jakupkɔˈvit͡sɛ] (German: Jakobsdorf) is a village in the administrative district of Gmina Kostomłoty, within Środa County, Lower Silesian Voivodeship, in south-western Poland.
