= Karczyce =

- Village
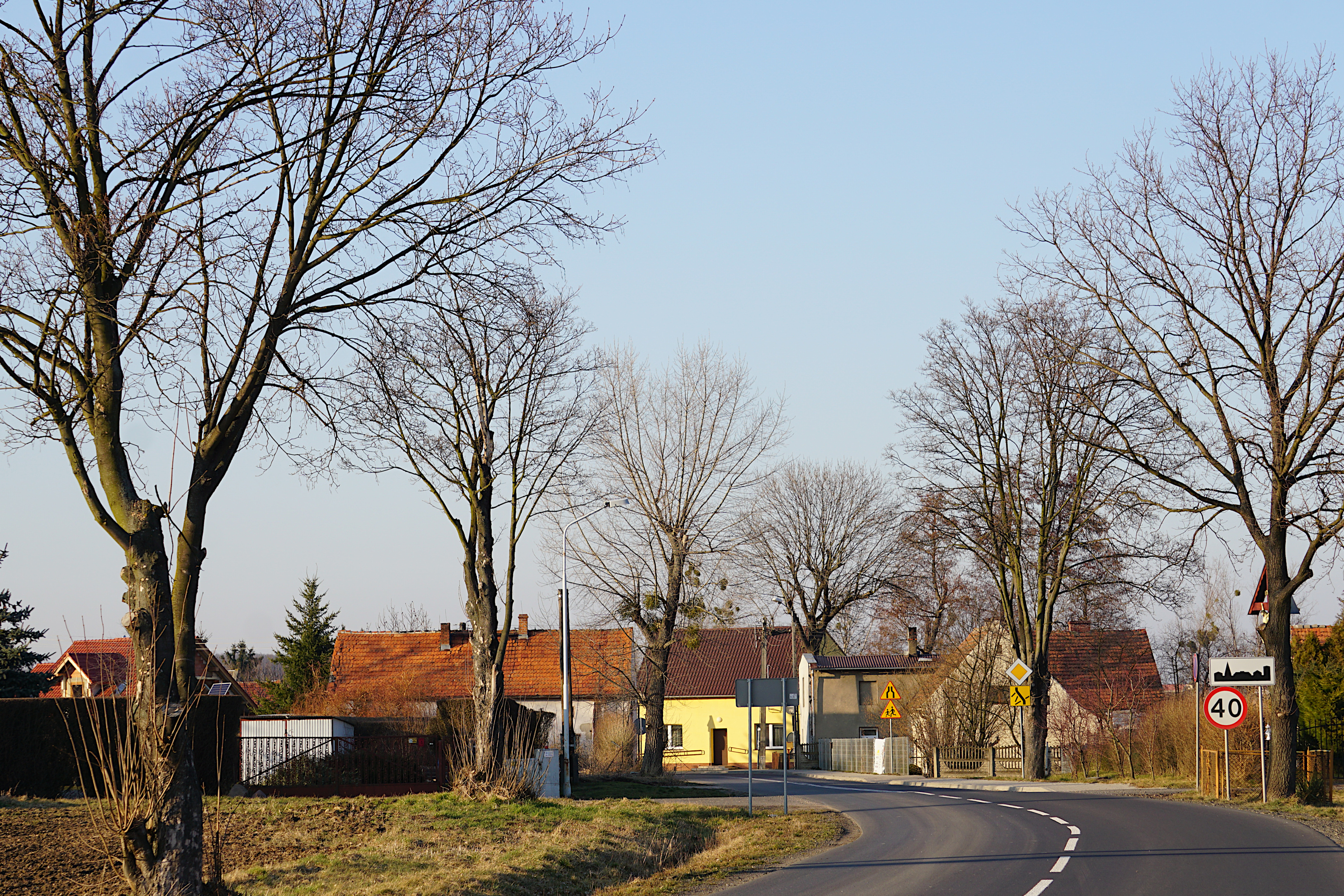

- Location within Poland
- Coordinates: 51°06′12″N 16°44′35″E
- Country: Poland
- Voivodeship: Lower Silesian
- County: Środa
- Gmina: Kostomłoty

Karczyce [karˈt͡ʂɨt͡sɛ] (German: Kertschütz) is a village in the administrative district of Gmina Kostomłoty, within Środa County, Lower Silesian Voivodeship, in south-western Poland.
