= Sikorzyce, Lower Silesian Voivodeship =

Sikorzyce
- Village
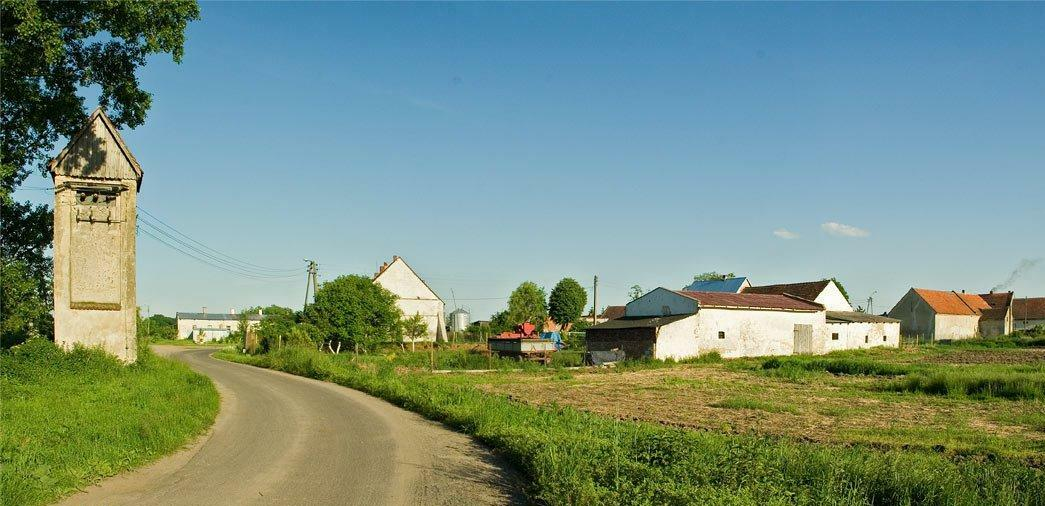

- Location within Poland
- Coordinates: 51°05′21″N 16°41′51″E
- Country: Poland
- Voivodeship: Lower Silesian
- County: Środa
- Gmina: Kostomłoty
- Population: 80

Sikorzyce [ɕikɔˈʐɨt͡sɛ] is a village in the administrative district of Gmina Kostomłoty, within Środa County, Lower Silesian Voivodeship, in south-western Poland.
