= Budziszów, Gmina Kostomłoty =

Budziszów
- Village
- Location within Poland
- Coordinates: 51°06′01″N 16°41′37″E
- Country: Poland
- Voivodeship: Lower Silesian
- County: Środa
- Gmina: Kostomłoty

Budziszów [buˈd͡ʑiʂuf] (German: Baudis-Meesendorf) is a village in the administrative district of Gmina Kostomłoty, within Środa County, Lower Silesian Voivodeship, in south-western Poland.
