= Falk Laws =

Prussian anti-Catholic Laws of 1873

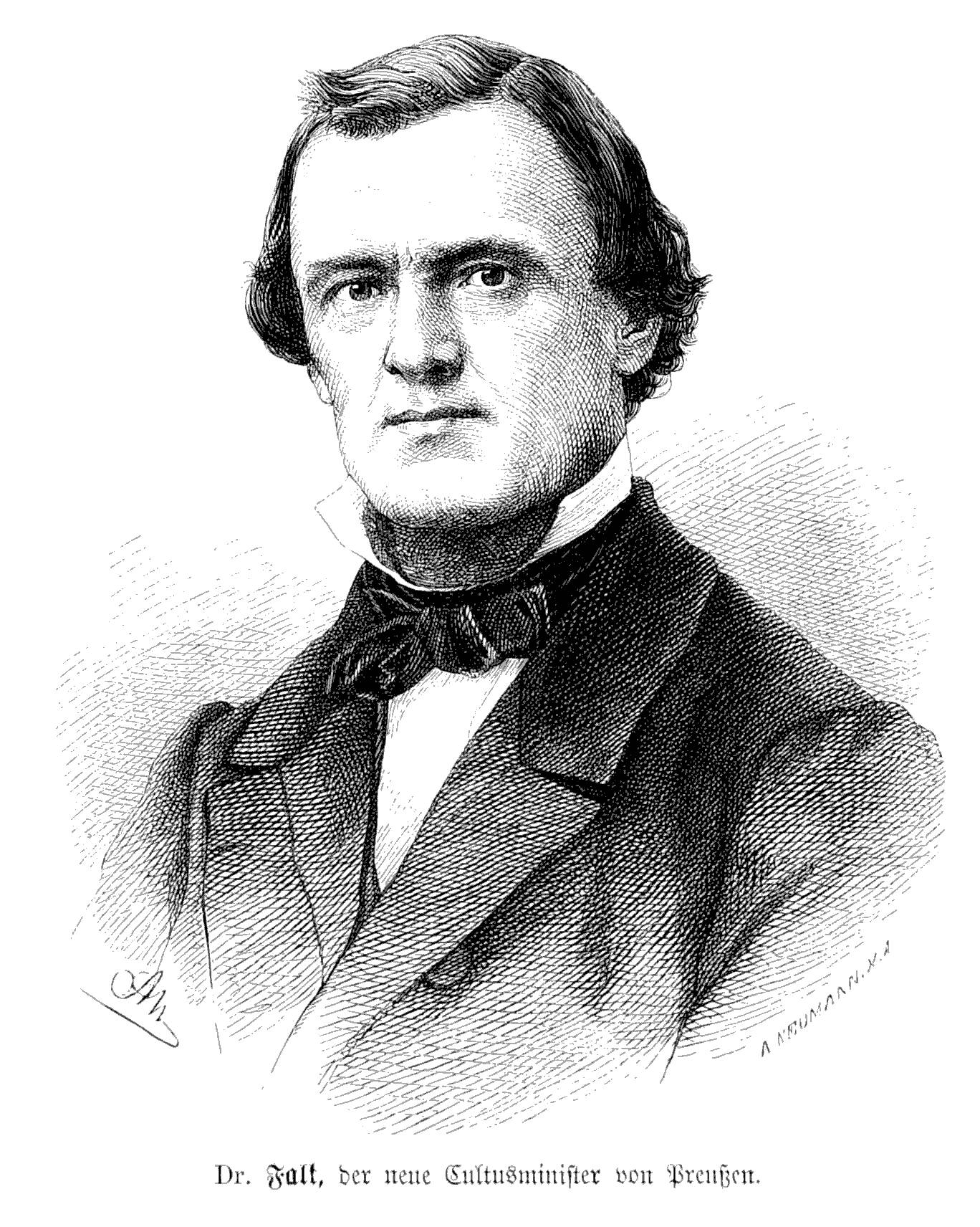
Prussian Culture Minister Adalbert Falk portrayed in the newspaper Die Gartenlaube in 1872

The Falk Laws, also called May Laws (German: Maigesetze), of 1873–1875 were legislative bills enacted in the German Kingdom of Prussia during the Kulturkampf conflict with the Catholic Church. They were named after Adalbert Falk, the Prussian Minister of Culture (Note: In German historiography, this function is informally known as the preußischer Kultusminister ("Prussian Minister of Culture"), but between 1849 and 1918, the official title was Minister der geistlichen, Unterrichts- und Medizinalangelegenheiten ("Minister of Religious, Educational and Medical Affairs").) (1872–1879).

The May Laws had the fullest support of Imperial German Chancellor Otto von Bismarck, though their actual author was Falk, who held state authority over the regulation of public worship as the Prussian Minister of Culture. Preliminary to the May Laws was the abolition of the Catholic department in the ministry of public worship (1871), the placing of the State in exclusive control of education, and the expulsion of the Jesuits from the empire (1873). A year later a like expulsion was decreed against the Redemptorists; Lazarists; Priests of the Holy Ghost, and Nuns of the Sacred Heart as being religious associations allied to the Jesuits.

== Background ==
During the Italian unification affecting the Papal State, Pope Pius IX in 1864 had published his Syllabus Errorum of 80 thesis statements denounced as false teaching and the encyclical Quanta cura against freedom of religion and separation of church and state. In summer 1870 the First Vatican Council had affirmed the jurisdictional authority of the Pope and proclaimed his infallibility as a dogma. These developments were suspiciously viewed as "ultramontanism" by liberal circles in the newly established German Empire, dominated by the mainly Protestant Prussian state, while the forces of political catholicism organised themselves in the Centre Party. Chancellor Otto von Bismarck especially noted their patronage of the Catholic Polish population in the Prussian Province of Posen, in West Prussia and in Upper Silesia as well as of the French in Alsace-Lorraine.

In 1871 Bismarck had the Pulpit Law implemented into the German Strafgesetzbuch Penal Code, prohibiting any public statement of priests in political affairs. The Gniezno archbishop Mieczysław Halka Ledóchowski was sentenced to two years in prison for violation. The "Jesuits' Law" of 1872 banned any branch establishment of the Society of Jesus on the territory of the German Reich. On 11 March 1872, Minister Adalbert Falk by law abolished any Catholic or Protestant administration of schools in Prussia and assigned the supervision solely to the ministry of education. German relations with the Vatican were cut after Pope Pius IX had rejected the ambassador Gustav Adolf Hohenlohe, commented by Bismarck with his "We will not walk to Canossa" speech in the Reichstag parliament on 14 March.

== Overview ==
The May Laws proper of 1873 were chiefly as follows:

- 95. The law of May related to the education and nomination of the clergy. According to this, ecclesiastical positions were open only to native Germans who had been educated at the German gymnasium, who had spent three years pursuing theology at a German university, who had passed the state examination, and who upon presentation by the bishop were accepted by the president of the province.
- 96. The law of 12 May related to the disciplinary powers of ecclesiastical superiors and established a secular court for deciding ecclesiastical questions, bestowing on it the right, under certain circumstances, of dismissing the clergy from their posts.
- 97. The law of 13 May, restricted the Church's power of punishing.
- 98. The law of 14 May (known as the Austrittgesetz or "law of separation"), laid down rules for those Catholics or Protestants who desired to leave their churches, declaring it sufficient for them to manifest their intention before a secular judge. The initial version of the Austrittgesetz exempted Jews, who were not permitted to leave Judaism as a religion, even if they left the community of one's birth. Some ultra-liberal and orthodox Jews protested against this legal discrimination and successfully petitioned emperor Wilhelm I to have the law amended, which happened in May 1876: henceforth, a Jew could not withdraw from his congregation.

Additional laws included:

- The May Law of 1874 enabled the state administration to expatriate reluctant clergymen, one year later all congregations were dissolved except for those engaged in nursing.
- The Civil Registry Law of 6 February 1875 (German: Zivilstandsgesetz; full formal name: Gesetz über die Beurkundung des Personenstands und die Eheschließung), which inter alia made civil marriage mandatory and abolished the requirement to baptise children.
- The "Breadbasket Law" of April 1875, passed by the Prussian Landtag, divested clerics of any state support, as long as they did not officially acknowledge the primacy of the German Empire.

== Regulation ==
=== Resistance and repression ===
In view of the Catholic resistance, the May Laws of 1873 gave responsibility for the training and appointment of clergy to the state, which resulted in the closing of nearly half of the seminaries in Prussia by 1878. Any cleric had to prove a university education and take a state examination. His appointment was subject to an obligation of disclosure to the Province's Oberpräsident (Upper President), who had the power to veto. During the reading in the Prussian Landtag in January, the Progressive deputy Rudolf Virchow had called the bill a Kulturkampf struggle for freedom from the church, a term soon adopted by both sides. The regulations translated into fewer seminarians and more parishes without priests, so that in many places half the parishes stood vacant, leaving hundreds of thousands of Catholics without regular spiritual care. In Trier, Catholics responded to the closing of the seminary by hosting seminarians in their homes and classes were conducted less formally. More commonly, seminarians were sent abroad for training, although such stop-gap measures did not nearly make up for the losses imposed by the May Laws.

At the same time a Prussian court for church matters was established. Those bishops acting contrary to the state laws were to be declared deposed. In October 1873 the Mainz bishop and Centre Party founder Wilhelm Emmanuel Freiherr von Ketteler, having publicly condemned the May Laws on a pilgrimage to Kevelaer, was arrested and sentenced to two years in prison, resulting in fierce protests. In March 1874 the Trier bishop Matthias Eberhard was put under arrest and died shortly after he was released from nine months of custody in 1876. Those assisting priests in contravention of the May Laws were subject to fines, arrest and imprisonment, and 210 people were convicted under these laws in the first four months of 1875. On 13 July 1874 an assault on Bismarck's life by a Catholic journeyman at Bad Kissingen failed.

In January 1876 the Bayerisch-Pfälzer Zeitung reported that the Bavarian Minister of War had been admonished to discontinue the exemptions from conscription previously accorded to priests and theological students.

=== Amendments and repealings ===
So much at variance with the Constitutions were these laws that the two paragraphs (15,18) guaranteeing the independence and self-government of the Church, had first to be amended (1873) and finally together with another (16) entirely abolished. Although violators of these laws faced serious punishments, the Prussian Episcopate rejected them as a whole. Foremost, they refused to present the government with candidates for nomination. The bishops, and many of the clergy, were fined or imprisoned — notably, two archbishops, Ledóchowski of Gnesen-Posen and Melchers of Cologne; four bishops, Brinkman of Munster, Blum of Limburg, Forster of Breslau, Martin of Paderborn; one auxiliary bishop, Janiszewski of Posen.

Moreover, the May Laws were made more severe. By the military law, students of theology lost their exemption from military service. Salaries due from the state were withheld from episcopal administrators and bishops until they would write their submission to the laws of the state; religious orders were dissolved except for those devoted to the care of the sick (1875). A law was passed enacting that clergy who refused to submit when ejected from office by the secular court might be expelled either from a certain locality or from the Empire (1874).

Despite the government's effort in executing its laws against the Church, most of the clergy and laity remained loyal to the bishops, and the Centre Party increased its membership in parliament with every election. The May Laws were finally modified by two comprehensive laws (21 May 1886 and 29 April 1887), which in substance yielded to the Church the control of ecclesiastical education; permitted the reassertion of the papal disciplinary authority over the clergy; allowed the restoration of public worship and the administration of the sacraments; the application of ecclesiastical disciplinary measures; and held out to the religious orders the hope of returning. In 1905 the last remnant of the May Laws disappeared when the anti-Jesuit Law was modified.

== Aftermath ==
The May Laws succeeded in making life harder for the clerics, but the failure of the May Laws to cause the total collapse of Catholic resistance and allow for complete control of the Church by the state is one facet of the broader failure of the Kulturkampf. Bismarck ultimately precipitated the unification of the German Catholics—despite the split-off of the Old Catholic Church—and strengthened their ties with the Roman papacy. In the federal election of 1874, the Catholic Centre Party gained 27.9% of the votes cast, confirming their status as the second strongest parliamentary group in the Reichstag. Furthermore, the chancellor's measures offended several of his Protestant national liberal allies. Bismarck had spotted a new and more serious threat in the rise of the Social Democratic Party, and was aware that he could not go without the Catholics' support to enact his Anti-Socialist Laws.

Pope Pius IX died on 7 February 1878, and in the negotiations with his successor Leo XIII the implications of the May Laws were attenuated. Diplomatic relations were resumed in 1882 and the Kulturkampf officially ended by the "Peace Laws" of 1886/87.
