= Pustynka =

- Village
- Location within Poland
- Coordinates: 51°06′59″N 16°42′49″E
- Country: Poland
- Voivodeship: Lower Silesian
- County: Środa
- Gmina: Kostomłoty

Pustynka [pusˈtɨŋka] is a village in the administrative district of Gmina Kostomłoty, within Środa County, Lower Silesian Voivodeship, in south-western Poland.
