= Szymanowice, Gmina Kostomłoty =

Szymanowice
- Village
- Location within Poland
- Coordinates: 51°03′16″N 16°40′45″E
- Country: Poland
- Voivodeship: Lower Silesian
- County: Środa
- Gmina: Kostomłoty

Szymanowice (Polish: [ʂɨmanɔˈvit͡sɛ]) is a village in the administrative district of Gmina Kostomłoty, within Środa County, Lower Silesian Voivodeship, in south-western Poland.
