= Wichrów, Lower Silesian Voivodeship =

Wichrów
- Village
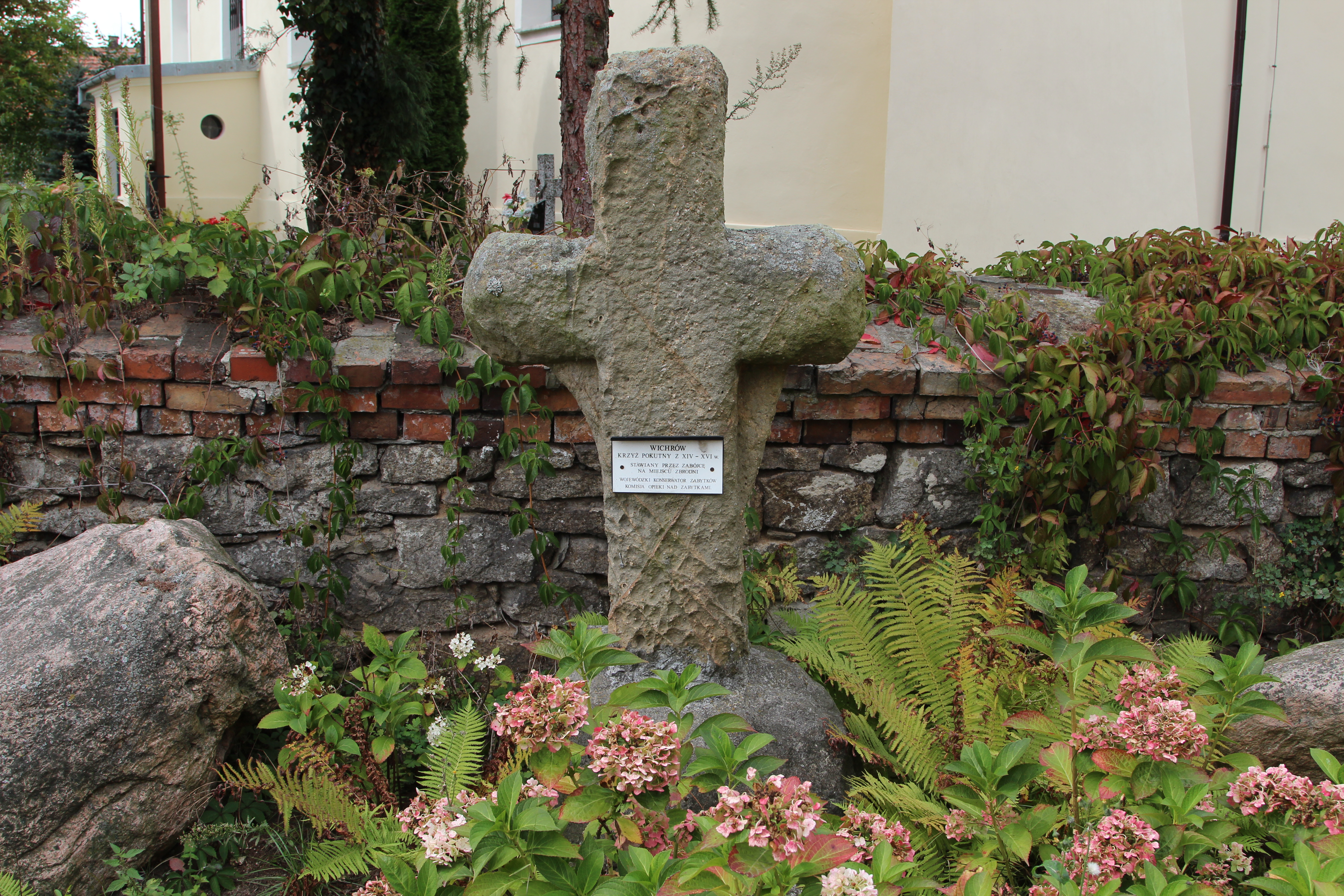
- Stone cross

- Location within Poland
- Coordinates: 51°02′03″N 16°34′25″E
- Country: Poland
- Voivodeship: Lower Silesian
- County: Środa
- Gmina: Kostomłoty
- Time zone: UTC+1 (CET)
  - Summer (DST): UTC+2 (CEST)

Wichrów [ˈvixruf] is a village in the administrative district of Gmina Kostomłoty, within Środa County, Lower Silesian Voivodeship, in south-western Poland.

In January 1945, in the village, the Germans carried out a mass executions of prisoners during the "death march" from the subcamp in Miłoszyce to the Gross-Rosen concentration camp. A mass grave of 120 victims was discovered later.
