= Osiek, Gmina Kostomłoty =

Osiek
- Village
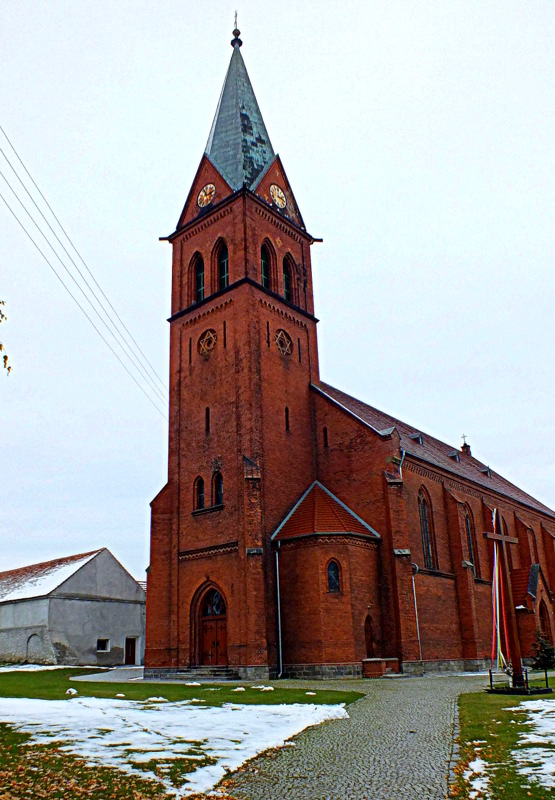
- Osiek, church

- Location within Poland
- Coordinates: 51°1′N 16°33′E
- Country: Poland
- Voivodeship: Lower Silesian
- County: Środa
- Gmina: Kostomłoty
- Elevation: 178 m (584 ft)
- Population (approx.): 450
- Website: https://osiek.info.pl/

Osiek [ˈɔɕɛk] is a village in the administrative district of Gmina Kostomłoty, within Środa County, Lower Silesian Voivodeship, in south-western Poland.
