= Siemidrożyce =

- Village
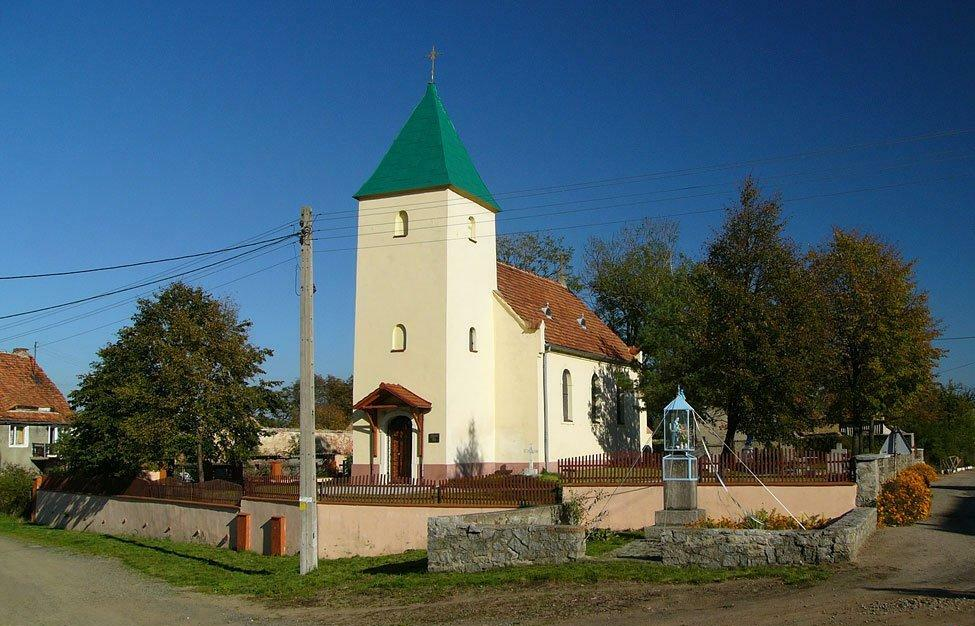
- Church and chapel in Siemidrożyce.

- Location within Poland
- Coordinates: 51°03′20″N 16°39′51″E
- Country: Poland
- Voivodeship: Lower Silesian
- County: Środa
- Gmina: Kostomłoty

Siemidrożyce [ɕɛmidrɔˈʐɨt͡sɛ] is a village in the administrative district of Gmina Kostomłoty, within Środa County, Lower Silesian Voivodeship, in south-western Poland.
