= Mieczków =

- Village
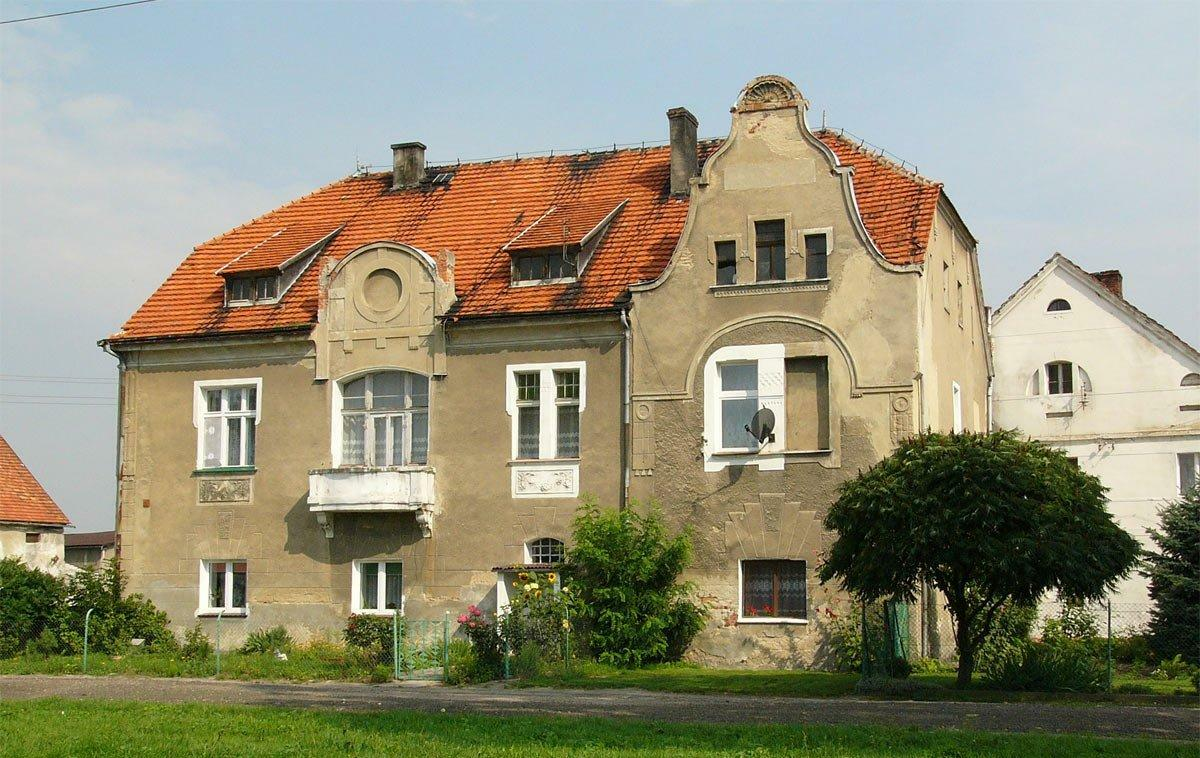

- Location within Poland
- Coordinates: 51°2′N 16°32′E
- Country: Poland
- Voivodeship: Lower Silesian
- County: Środa
- Gmina: Kostomłoty

Mieczków [ˈmjɛt͡ʂkuf] is a village in the administrative district of Gmina Kostomłoty, within Środa County, Lower Silesian Voivodeship, in south-western Poland.

== Notable people ==
- Adalbert Falk (1827–1900), German politician and lawyer
