= Paździorno =

- Village
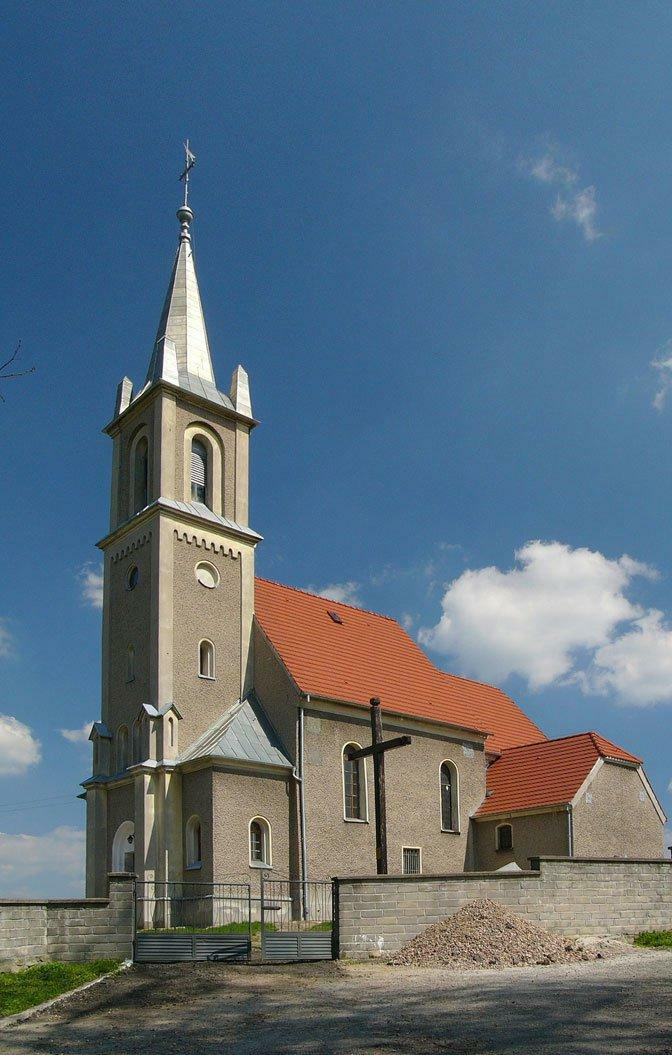
- Catholic church

- Location within Poland
- Coordinates: 51°1′N 16°38′E
- Country: Poland
- Voivodeship: Lower Silesian
- County: Środa
- Gmina: Kostomłoty

Paździorno [paʑˈd͡ʑɔrnɔ] is a village in the administrative district of Gmina Kostomłoty, within Środa County, Lower Silesian Voivodeship, in south-western Poland.
