= Zabłoto =

- Village
- Location within Poland
- Coordinates: 51°4′N 16°37′E
- Country: Poland
- Voivodeship: Lower Silesian
- County: Środa
- Gmina: Kostomłoty
- Time zone: UTC+1 (CET)
  - Summer (DST): UTC+2 (CEST)
- Vehicle registration: DSR

Zabłoto [zaˈbwɔtɔ] is a village in the administrative district of Gmina Kostomłoty, within Środa County, Lower Silesian Voivodeship, in south-western Poland.

The name of the village is of Polish origin and comes from the words za and błoto, meaning "behind a mud".
