= Wnorów, Lower Silesian Voivodeship =

Wnorów
- Village
- Location within Poland
- Coordinates: 51°04′26″N 16°43′06″E
- Country: Poland
- Voivodeship: Lower Silesian
- County: Środa
- Gmina: Kostomłoty

Wnorów [ˈvnɔruf] is a village in the administrative district of Gmina Kostomłoty, within Środa County, Lower Silesian Voivodeship, in south-western Poland.
