= Piotrowice, Gmina Kostomłoty =

Piotrowice
- Village
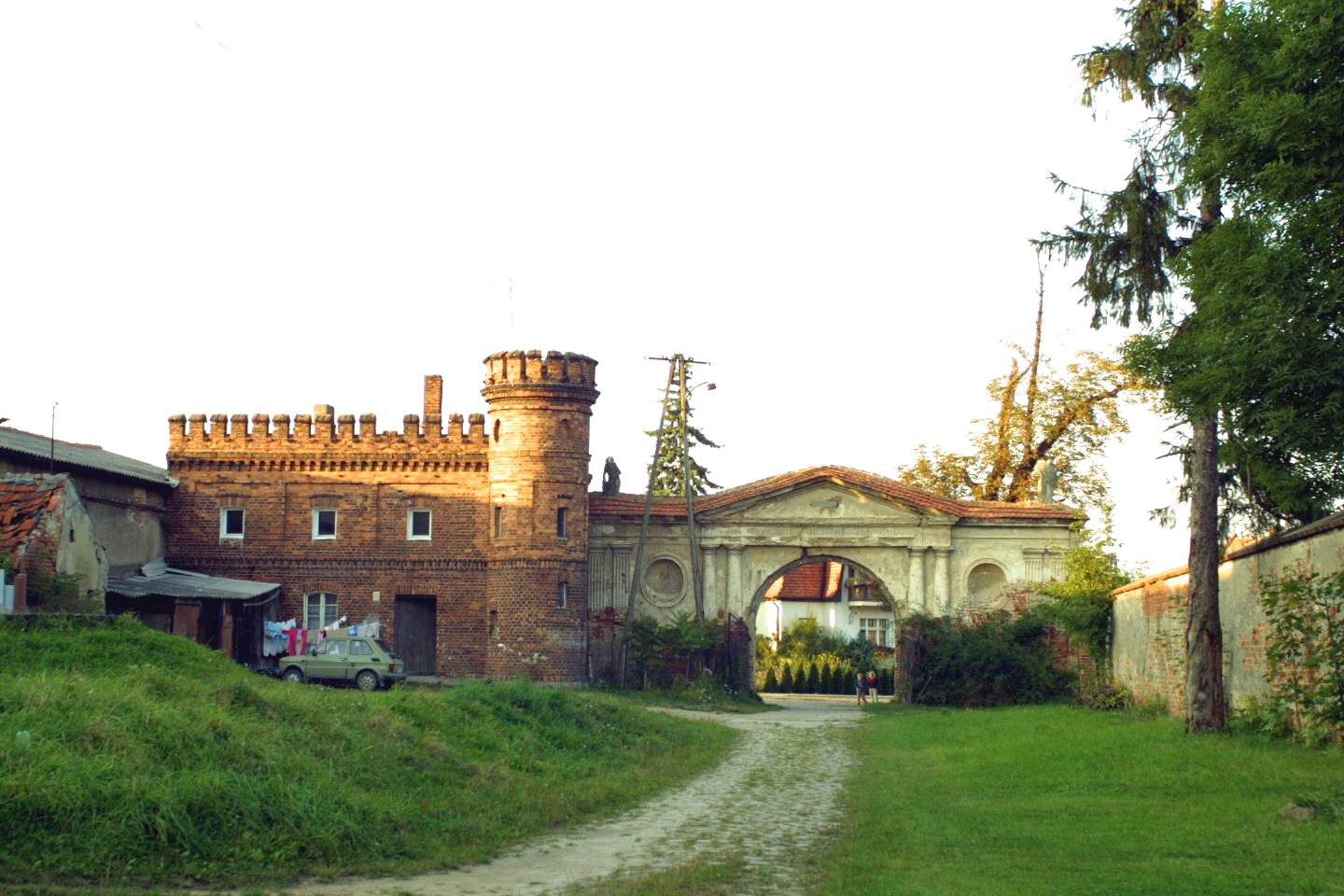
- Historic gate in Piotrowice

- Location within Poland
- Coordinates: 51°2′N 16°41′E
- Country: Poland
- Voivodeship: Lower Silesian
- County: Środa
- Gmina: Kostomłoty
- Time zone: UTC+1 (CET)
  - Summer (DST): UTC+2 (CEST)
- Vehicle registration: DSR

Piotrowice [pjɔtrɔˈvit͡sɛ] is a village in the administrative district of Gmina Kostomłoty, within Środa County, Lower Silesian Voivodeship, in south-western Poland.

== History ==
Piotrowice dates back to the Middle Ages. The oldest known mention of the village comes from a document from 1221. It was the location of a medieval motte-and-bailey castle, which is now an archaeological site.

In January 1945, in the village, the Germans carried out a mass execution of a group of 154 prisoners during a death march from the subcamp in Miłoszyce to the Gross-Rosen concentration camp. Two mass graves were discovered in 1970 and 1977.

== Transport ==
The Polish east–west A4 motorway, which is part of the European route E40, passes nearby, south of the village.

== Sports ==
The local football club is KS Piotrowice. It competes in the lower leagues.
