= Adalbert Falk =

German politician (1827–1900)

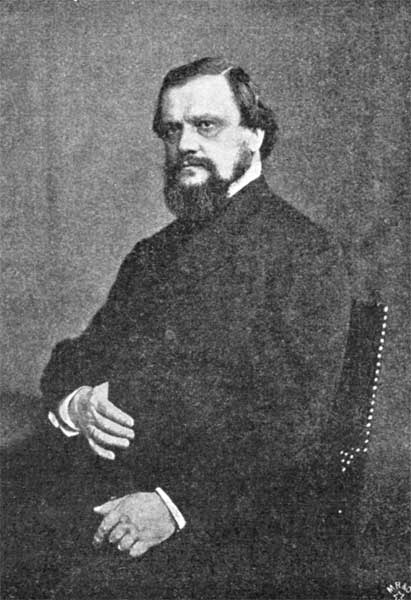
Adalbert Falk in 1900

Paul Ludwig Adalbert Falk (10 August 1827 – 7 July 1900) was a German politician.

Falk was born in Metschkau (Mieczków), Silesia. In 1847, he entered the Prussian state service, and in 1853, he became public prosecutor at Lyck (now Ełk). In 1858, he was elected a deputy and joined the Old Liberal Party. In 1868, he became a privy councillor in the ministry of justice.

In 1872, he was made minister of education and, in connection with Otto von Bismarck's policy of the Kulturkampf, was responsible for the Falk Laws, or May Laws, against the Roman Catholic Church. In 1879, with his position becoming untenable because of the death of Pope Pius IX and the change of German policy with regard to the Vatican, he resigned his office but retained his seat in the Reichstag until 1882.

He was then made president of the supreme court of justice at Hamm, where he died in 1900.
