= Gmina Kostomłoty =

Gmina Kostomłoty Kostomłoty Commune
- Gmina
- Coat of arms
- Interactive map of Gmina Kostomłoty
- Coordinates (Kostomłoty): 51°3′N 16°37′E
- Country: Poland
- Voivodeship: Lower Silesian
- County: Środa
- Seat: Kostomłoty

Area
  - Total: 146.25 km^{2} (56.47 sq mi)

Population (2021)
  - Total: 6,996
  - Density: 47.84/km^{2} (123.9/sq mi)
- Website: http://www.kostomloty.pl

Gmina Kostomłoty is a rural gmina (administrative district) in Środa County, Lower Silesian Voivodeship, in south-western Poland. Its seat is the village of Kostomłoty, which lies approximately 12 kilometres (7 mi) south of Środa Śląska and 31 km (19 mi) west of the regional capital Wrocław. It is part of the larger Wrocław metropolitan area.

== Demographics ==
In 2021, the population of the gmina was 6996 individuals, out of which 3473 were men and 3523 were women. Since the 2011 Polish census, the population has decreased by about 2.3%. The unemployment rate in the gmina is 4.4%. The number of seniors is about 19.9%, which is slightly lower than the average for Poland. The gmina has a very low amount of foreigners: less than 1% of the population is of a different citizenship than Polish, and about a percent has been born outside of Poland.

== Geography ==
The gmina covers an area of 146.25 square kilometres (56.5 sq mi), out of which 88% is farmland, and 4% is forests, which are mostly concentrated in the south of it, in the valley of Strzegomka. The gmina makes up about 20% of the area of the county.

== Neighbouring gminas ==
Gmina Kostomłoty is bordered by the gminas of Kąty Wrocławskie, Miękinia, Mietków, Środa Śląska, Udanin and Żarów.

== Villages ==
The gmina contains the villages of Bogdanów, Budziszów, Chmielów, Czechy, Godków, Jakubkowice, Jarząbkowice, Jenkowice, Karczyce, Kostomłoty, Lisowice, Mieczków, Osieczna, Osiek, Paździorno, Piersno, Piotrowice, Pustynka, Ramułtowice, Samborz, Samsonowice, Siemidrożyce, Sikorzyce, Sobkowice, Świdnica Polska, Szymanowice, Wichrów, Wilków Średzki, Wnorów and Zabłoto.

== Twin towns – sister cities ==
Gmina Kostomłoty is twinned with:

- Sierentz, France
