= Czechy, Gmina Kostomłoty =

Czechy
- Village
- Location within Poland
- Coordinates: 51°4′35″N 16°39′28″E
- Country: Poland
- Voivodeship: Lower Silesian
- County: Środa
- Gmina: Kostomłoty

Czechy [ˈt͡ʂɛxɨ] (German: Tschechen) is a village in the administrative district of Gmina Kostomłoty, within Środa County, Lower Silesian Voivodeship, in south-western Poland.
