= Samborz, Lower Silesian Voivodeship =

Samborz
- Village
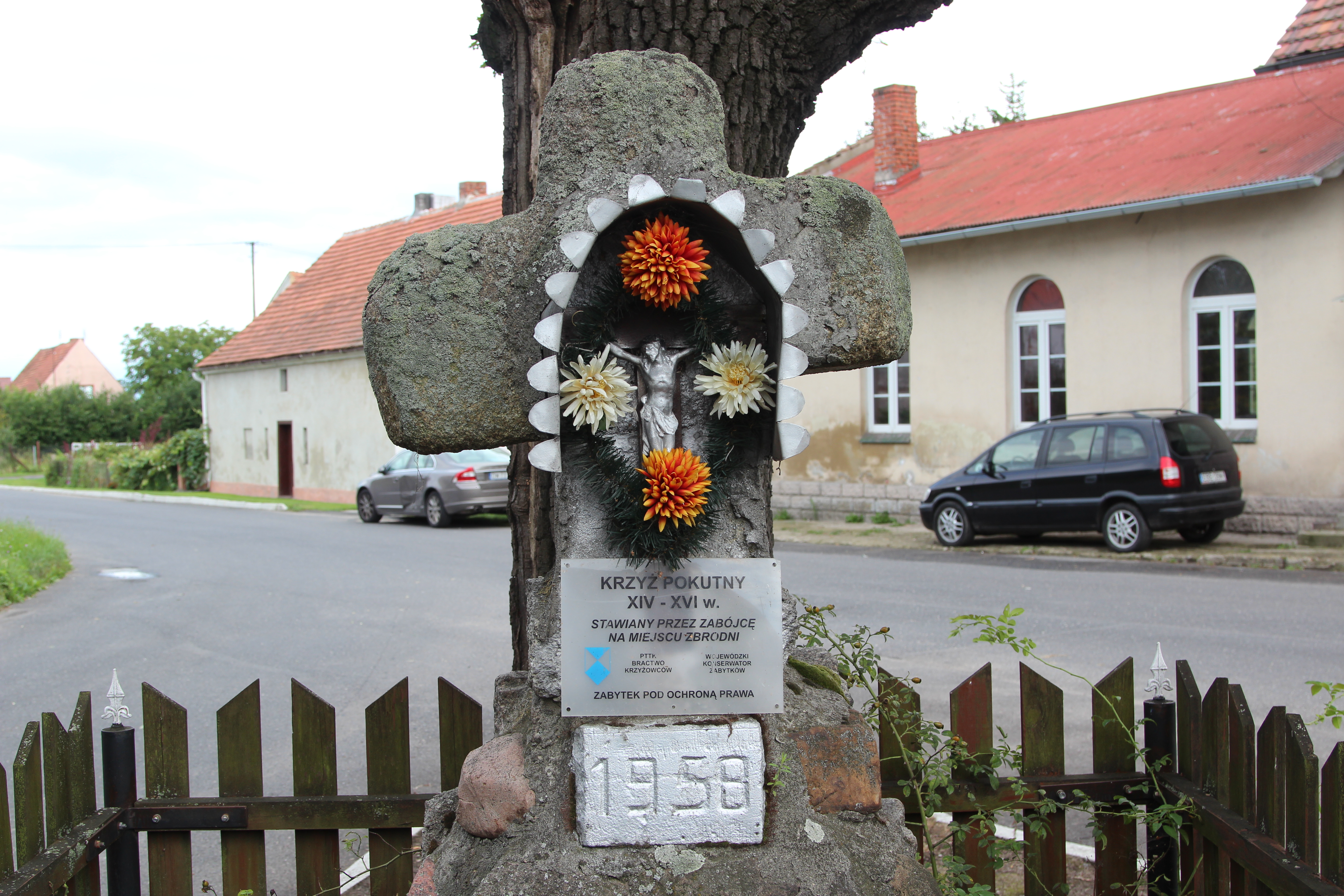
- Conciliation cross

- Location within Poland
- Coordinates: 51°4′N 16°34′E
- Country: Poland
- Voivodeship: Lower Silesian
- County: Środa
- Gmina: Kostomłoty
- Population (2021): 180
- Time zone: UTC+1 (CET)
  - Summer (DST): UTC+2 (CEST)
- Postal code: 55-311
- Vehicle registration: DSR

Samborz [ˈsambɔʂ] is a village in the administrative district of Gmina Kostomłoty, within Środa County, Lower Silesian Voivodeship, in south-western Poland.

== Administrative division ==
In the years 1975-1998 the village administratively belonged to the Wrocław Voivodeship.

== Orthodox church ==
In the village, there is a parish Orthodox Church of Saint Paraskeva of the Balkans.
