= Wilków Średzki =

- Village
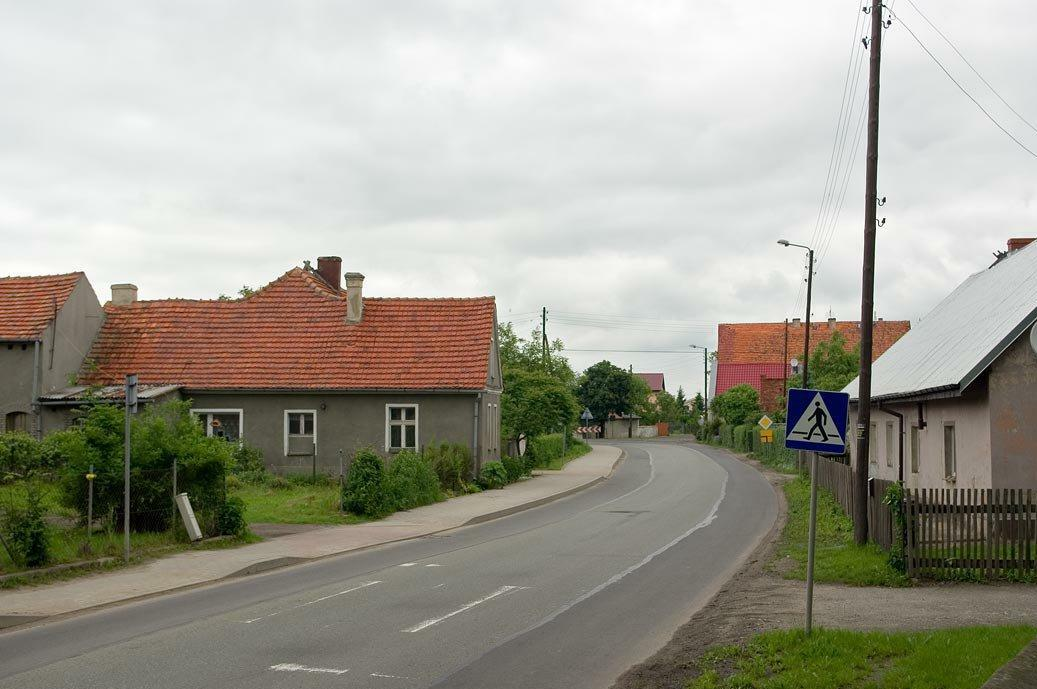

- Location within Poland
- Coordinates: 51°04′01″N 16°42′10″E
- Country: Poland
- Voivodeship: Lower Silesian
- County: Środa
- Gmina: Kostomłoty

Wilków Średzki [ˈvilkuf ˈɕrɛt͡ski] is a village in the administrative district of Gmina Kostomłoty, within Środa County, Lower Silesian Voivodeship, in south-western Poland.
