= Lisowice, Gmina Kostomłoty =

Lisowice
- Village
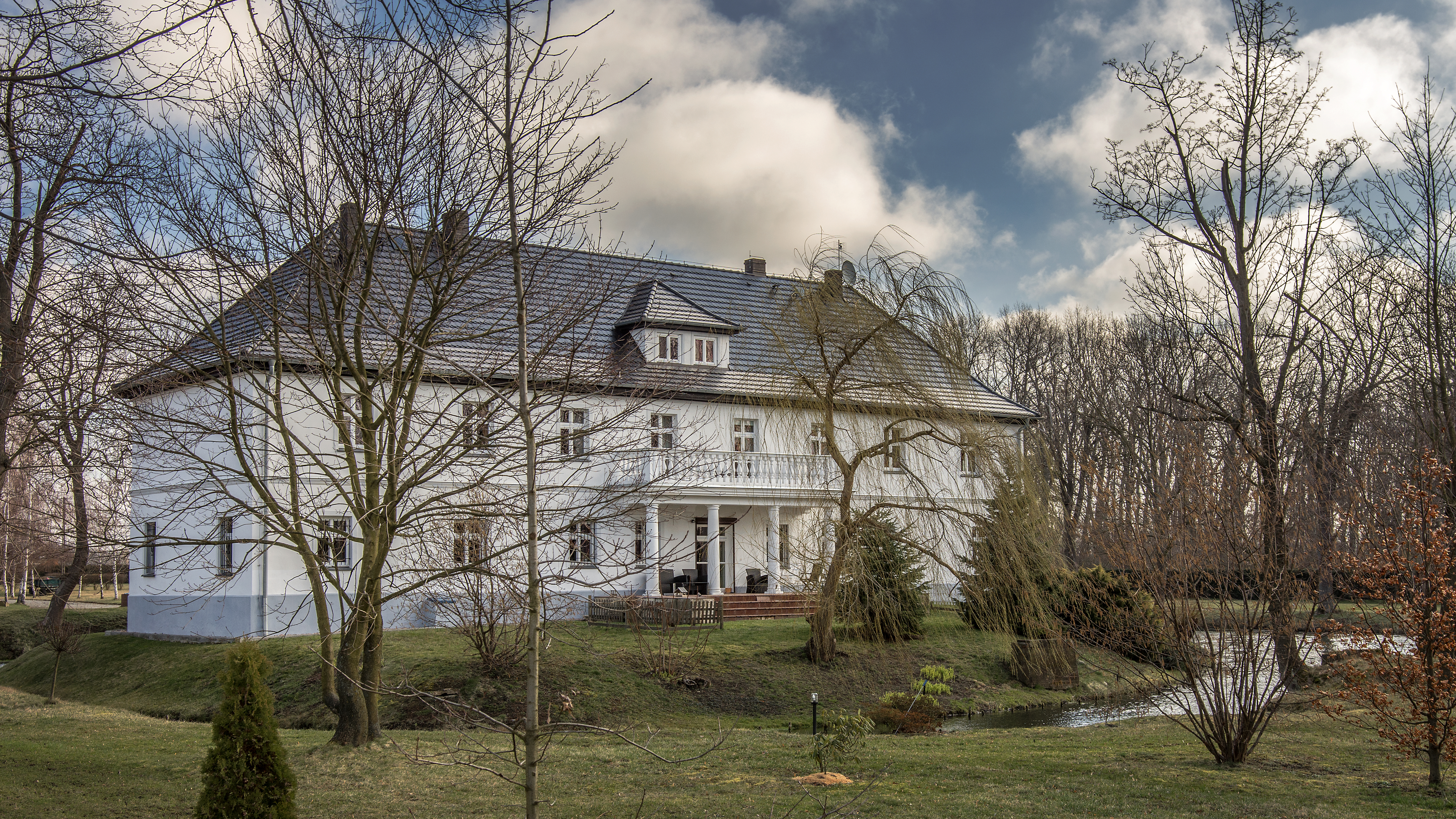
- Lisowice manor house

- Location within Poland
- Coordinates: 51°04′53″N 16°44′16″E
- Country: Poland
- Voivodeship: Lower Silesian
- County: Środa
- Gmina: Kostomłoty

Lisowice [lisɔˈvit͡sɛ] is a village in the administrative district of Gmina Kostomłoty, within Środa County, Lower Silesian Voivodeship, in south-western Poland.
