= Concordat of 1855 =

Agreement between the Holy See and the Austrian Empire

The Concordat of 1855 was a Concordat or agreement between the Holy See and the Austrian Empire as regards the Catholic Church in Austria.

The Austrian Bishops' Conference was established in 1849 and agreed to a Concordat that would grant the Church greater scope in a variety of areas. It was granted full control over its own affairs, including making appointments. The Church was also placed in charge of 98% of public primary schools: those that were nominally Catholic and controlled the curriculum. The Catholic ecclesiastical courts were given jurisdiction over marriages where the couple, either or both, were Catholic.

== International repercussions and abolishment ==
The Concordat had an impact across Germany stimulating anti-clericalism amongst liberal opinion. During the Austro-Prussian War, the Austrian soldiers were called "Concordat soldiers." The Austrian defeat in the war forced the Emperor Franz Josef to grant concessions to German liberals in Cisleithania. Following the Austro-Hungarian Compromise of 1867, the liberals, in the Josephinist tradition, largely influenced the Cisleithanian Constitution of 1867. Article 17 stated, "The state shall have the right to superior direction and superintendence over the entire system of education and instruction." The abrogation of the Concordat was formalised in 1870.

Originally there were plans to extend the Concordat to Hungary, the largest part of Transleithania, but they never materialised.
