= Jenkowice, Gmina Kostomłoty =

Jenkowice
- Village
- Location within Poland
- Coordinates: 51°04′27″N 16°35′57″E
- Country: Poland
- Voivodeship: Lower Silesian
- County: Środa
- Gmina: Kostomłoty

Jenkowice [jɛnkɔˈvit͡sɛ] (German: Jenkwitz) is a village in the administrative district of Gmina Kostomłoty, within Środa County, Lower Silesian Voivodeship, in south-western Poland.
