= Chmielów, Lower Silesian Voivodeship =

Chmielów
- Village
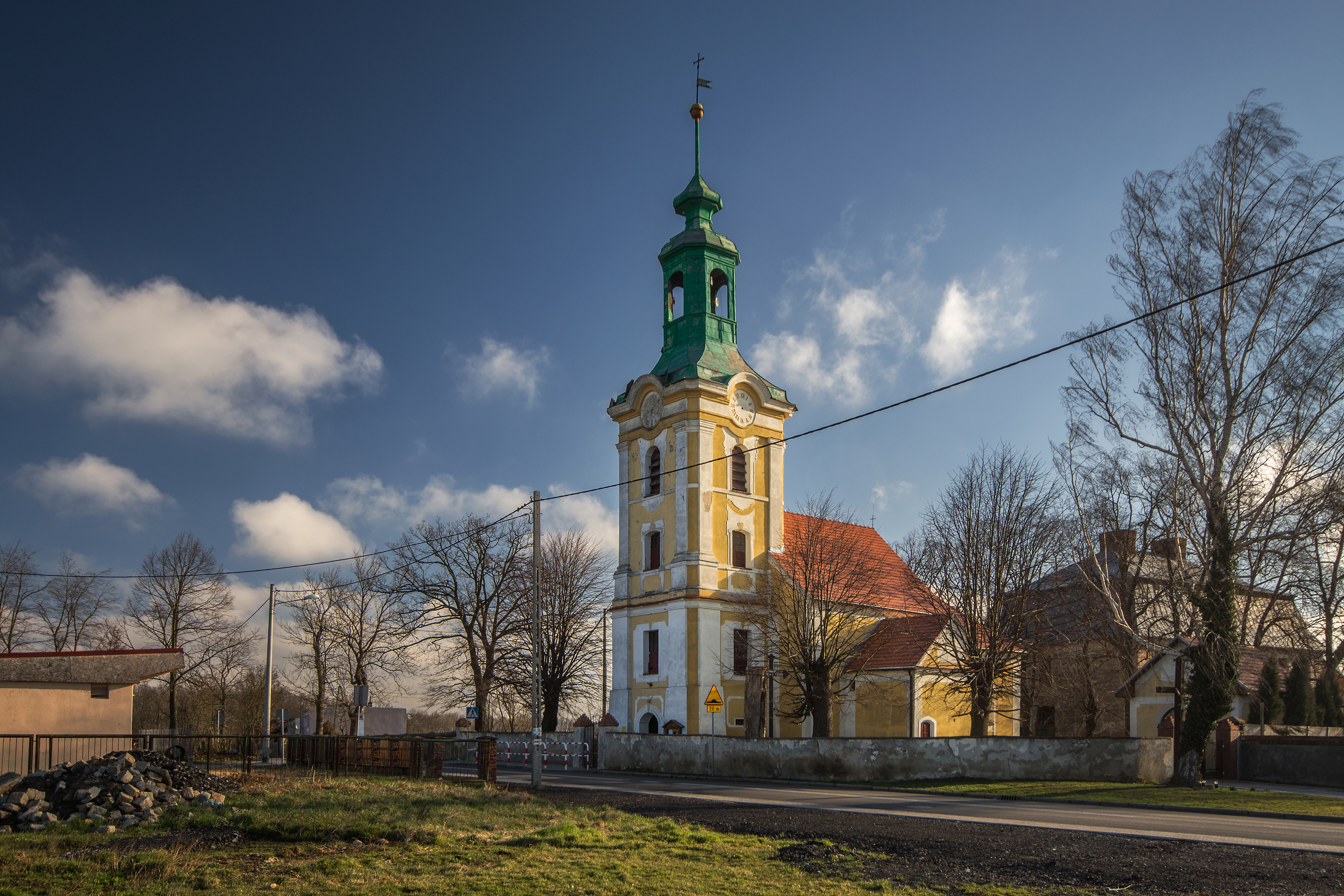
- Church of Saint Martin

- Location within Poland
- Coordinates: 51°04′11″N 16°44′28″E
- Country: Poland
- Voivodeship: Lower Silesian
- County: Środa
- Gmina: Kostomłoty

Chmielów [ˈxmjɛluf] (German: Schmellwitz) is a village in the administrative district of Gmina Kostomłoty, within Środa County, Lower Silesian Voivodeship, in south-western Poland.
