= Jarząbkowice, Lower Silesian Voivodeship =

Jarząbkowice
- Village
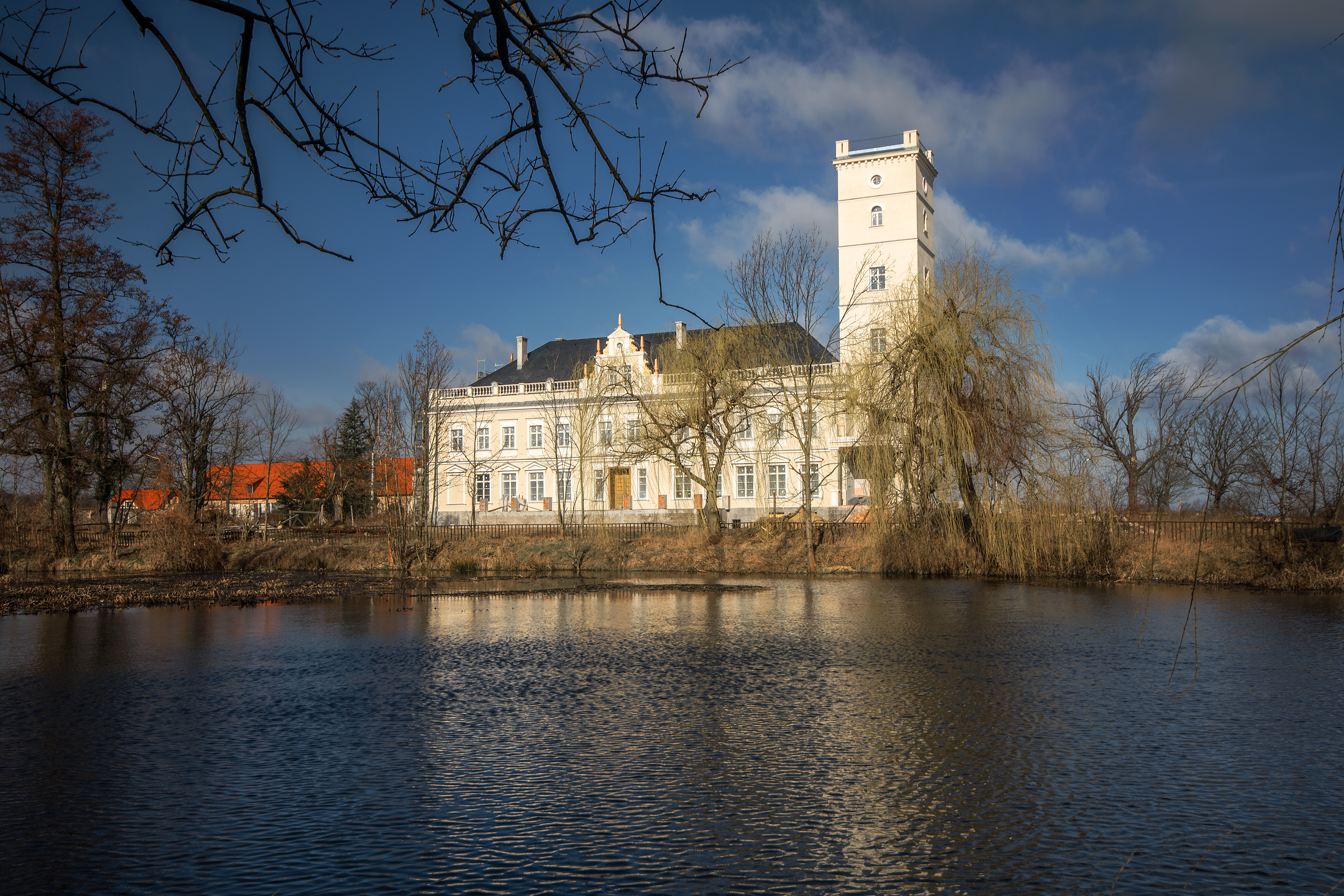
- Palace

- Location within Poland
- Coordinates: 51°06′10″N 16°45′58″E
- Country: Poland
- Voivodeship: Lower Silesian
- County: Środa
- Gmina: Kostomłoty
- Time zone: UTC+1 (CET)
  - Summer (DST): UTC+2 (CEST)
- Vehicle registration: DSR

Jarząbkowice [jaʐɔmpkɔˈvit͡sɛ] is a village in the administrative district of Gmina Kostomłoty, within Środa County, Lower Silesian Voivodeship, in south-western Poland.
