= Godków, Lower Silesian Voivodeship =

Godków
- Village
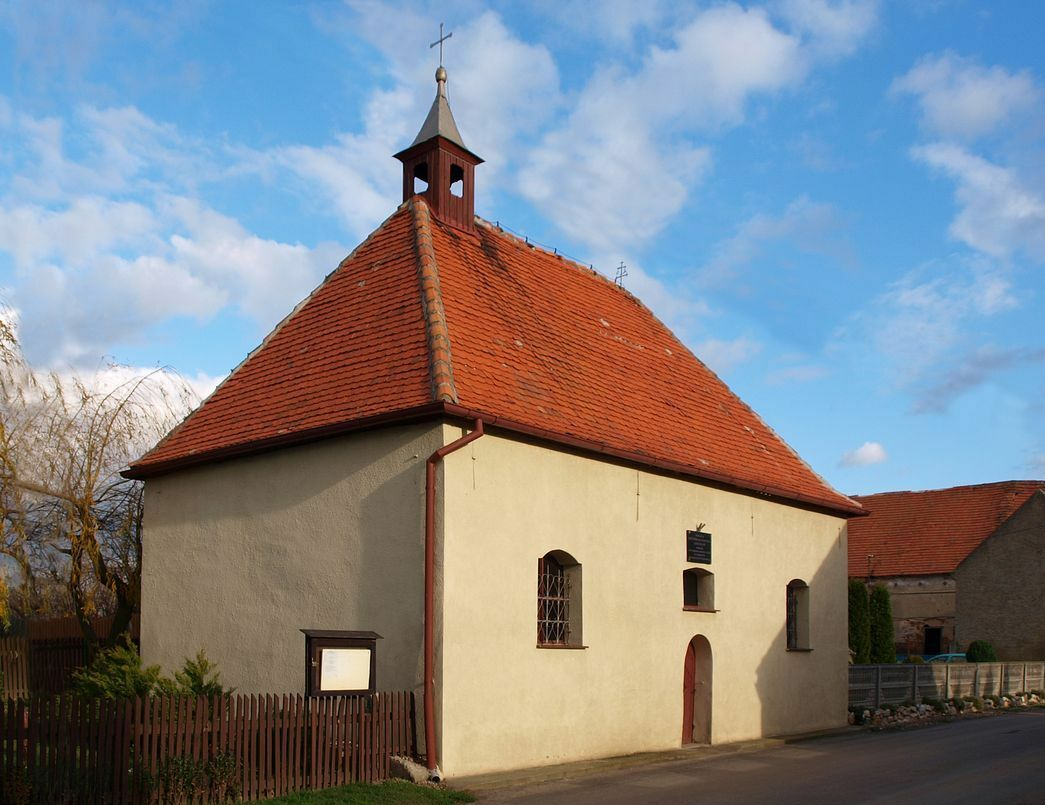

- Location within Poland
- Coordinates: 51°00′33″N 16°35′48″E
- Country: Poland
- Voivodeship: Lower Silesian
- County: Środa
- Gmina: Kostomłoty

Godków [ˈɡɔtkuf] (German: Guckelhausen) is a village in the administrative district of Gmina Kostomłoty, within Środa County, Lower Silesian Voivodeship, in south-western Poland.
