= Udanin =

- Village
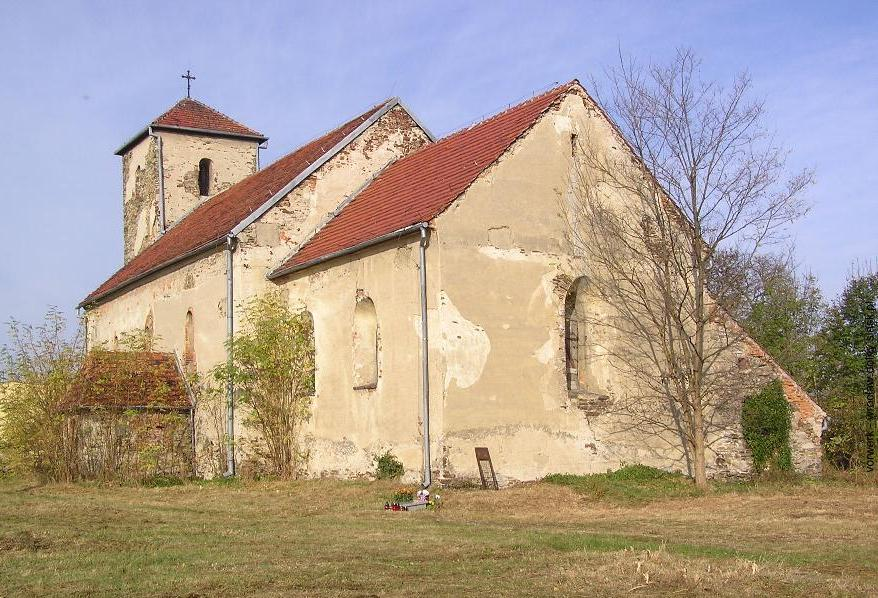
- Church of Saint Ursula

- Location within Poland
- Coordinates: 51°2′13″N 16°27′12″E
- Country: Poland
- Voivodeship: Lower Silesian
- County: Środa
- Gmina: Udanin
- Population: 4,961
- Postal code: 55-340
- ISO 3166 code: PL
- Website: www.udanin.pl

Udanin [uˈdanin] (German: Gäbersdorf) is a village in Środa County, Lower Silesian Voivodeship, in the southwestern region of Poland. It is the seat of the administrative district (gmina) called Gmina Udanin. As of June 30, 2004, the commune had a population of 5,665. As of 31 March 2021, Udanin had a population of 4,961.

== Land use ==
According to data from 2002, the Udanin commune has an area of 110.71 km^{2} (43 sq mi). This included 87% of agricultural land and 4% for forest use.

The municipality accounts for 15.73% of the Powiat (county) area.

== District villages ==
Damianowo, Drogomiłowice, Dziwigórz, Gościsław, Jarosław, Jarostów, Karnice, Konary, Lasek, Lusina, Łagiewniki Średzkie , Pichorowice, Piekary, Pilaszkowice, Różana, Sokolniki, Udanin, Ujazd Dolny, Ujazd Górny
