= Gościsław =

Gościsław may refer to the following places in Poland:

- Gościsław in Gmina Udanin, Środa County in Lower Silesian Voivodeship (SW Poland)
- Other places called Gościsław (listed in Polish Wikipedia)
