= Gail E. Finney =

American literary scholar and professor

Gail E. Finney is an American literary scholar and professor emerita of Comparative Literature and German at the University of California, Davis.

She is known for her research in literary scholarship, especially in psychoanalysis, trauma theory, nineteenth- and twentieth-century European literature, and gender studies.

== Education and career ==
She earned her A.B. degree in German summa cum laude from Princeton University and completed her Ph.D. in Comparative Literature at the University of California, Berkeley. From 1980 to 1988, she taught at Harvard University as assistant and then associate professor of German, later returning in 1997 as a visiting professor.

In 1988 she joined UC Davis, where she served as professor of German and comparative literature until her retirement in 2020. Her administrative roles at UC Davis included assistant vice provost for academic personnel from 1997 to 2000 and Faculty Assistant for Academic Personnel to the Dean of Humanities, Arts, and Cultural Studies from 2007 to 2008.

After retiring in December 2020 during the COVID-19 pandemic; Finney remained active in scholarly, creative, and community pursuits.

She also resumed musical training through piano lessons and became involved in community theater, performing in six productions with the Winters Theatre Company. Finney has participated regularly in the Gerlind Institute for Cultural Studies in Oakland, where she later joined the board.

== Research and scholarship ==
Finney's research spans psychoanalysis and literature/film, trauma theory, turn-of-the-century European drama, modern drama, the nineteenth-century European novel, feminism, and postwar German women writers.

Her scholarship has been supported fellowships from the DAAD, the National Endowment for the Humanities, and the Alexander von Humboldt Foundation. She received the UC Davis Distinguished Graduate/Professional Teaching Award in 2007 and the Herbert A. Young Deans’ Fellowship from 2013 to 2016.

Finney's scholarly works include studies in modern literature and cultural analysis. Her works include The Counterfeit Idyll: The Garden Ideal and Social Reality in Nineteenth-Century Fiction; Women in Modern Drama: Freud, Feminism, and European Theater at the Turn of the Century; and the edited volume Look Who’s Laughing: Gender and Comedy.

She has also authored a monograph on Christa Wolf and contributed to interdisciplinary cultural studies with Visual Culture in Twentieth-Century Germany: Text as Spectacle.

== Selected publications ==
=== Selected books ===
- Finney, G.E (1984). The counterfeit idyll: the garden ideal and social reality in nineteenth-century fiction. Studien zur deutschen Literatur. Tübingen: Niemeyer. ISBN 978-3-484-18081-9.
- Finney, G.E (1989). Women in Modern Drama: Freud, Feminism, and European Theater at the Turn of the Century. Ithaca, NY: Cornell University Press. p. 234. ISBN 9780801499258.
- Finney, G.E (1994). Look who's laughing: gender and comedy (reprint ed.). Langhorne, PA.: Taylor & Francis. ISBN 9782881246456.
- Finney, G.E (1999). Christa Wolf. New York: Twayne Publishers. p. 142. ISBN 978-0805746228.
- Finney, G.E, ed. (2006). Visual culture in twentieth-century Germany: text as spectacle. Bloomington, Ind.: Indiana Univ. Press. ISBN 978-0253218339.
- Finney, G.E; Shockey, G.C; Bernd, C., eds. (2011). Ain güt geboren edel man: a Festschrift for Winder McConnell on the occasion of his sixty-fifth birthday. Göppinger Arbeiten zur Germanistik. Göppingen: Kümmerle Verlag. ISBN 978-3-86758-012-0.
- Finney, G.E (2013). Literature of Fantasy and the Supernatural. Cognella Academic Pub. p. 304. ISBN 978-1621314219.
- Finney, G.E, ed. (2018-06-01). Wounded: Studies in Literary and Cinematic Trauma. MDPI. doi:10.3390/books978-3-03842-936-4. ISBN 978-3-03842-936-4.
- Finney, G.E (2025). From the Roach Motel to the Ivory Tower: Confessions of an Amorous Professor. Ardent Publishing LLC. ISBN 9798993818115.

=== Selected articles ===
- Finney, G.E (1983). "Self-Reflexive Siblings: Incest as Narcissism in Tieck, Wagner, and Thomas Mann". The German Quarterly. 56 (2): 243–256. doi:10.2307/405679. ISSN 0016-8831. JSTOR 405679.
- Finney, G.E (1983). "Type and Countertype: The Dialectics of Space inDie Wahlverwandtschaften". The Germanic Review: Literature, Culture, Theory. 58 (2): 67–74. doi:10.1080/00168890.1983.9936519. ISSN 0016-8890.
- Finney, G.E (1984). "Garden Paradigms in 19th-Century Fiction". Comparative Literature. 36 (1): 20–33. doi:10.2307/1770326. ISSN 0010-4124. JSTOR 1770326.
- Finney, G.E (1985). "Theater of Impotence: The One-Act Tragedy at the Turn of the Century". Modern Drama. 28 (3): 451–461. doi:10.1353/mdr.1985.0051. ISSN 1712-5286.
- Finney, G.E (1990). "Imagining the Other: Sexual Transformation and Social Reality in GDR Literature". German Life and Letters. 44 (1): 45–57. doi:10.1111/j.1468-0483.1990.tb00326.x. ISSN 0016-8777.

== See also ==
- Femme fragile
- Moms Mabley
