= Gerhart Hauptmann =

German author (1862–1946)

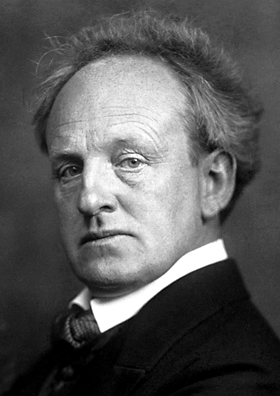
- Born: Gerhart Johann Robert Hauptmann; 15 November 1862; Obersalzbrunn, Silesia, Kingdom of Prussia (now Szczawno-Zdrój, Poland)
- Died: 6 June 1946 (aged 83); Agnetendorf in Niederschlesien, Polish-administrated Occupied Germany, now Jelenia Góra, Poland
- Occupation: Dramatist
- Writing career
- Notable works: The Weavers, The Rats
- Notable awards: Nobel Prize in Literature (1912); Goethe Prize (1932)
- Literary movement: Naturalism

Signature
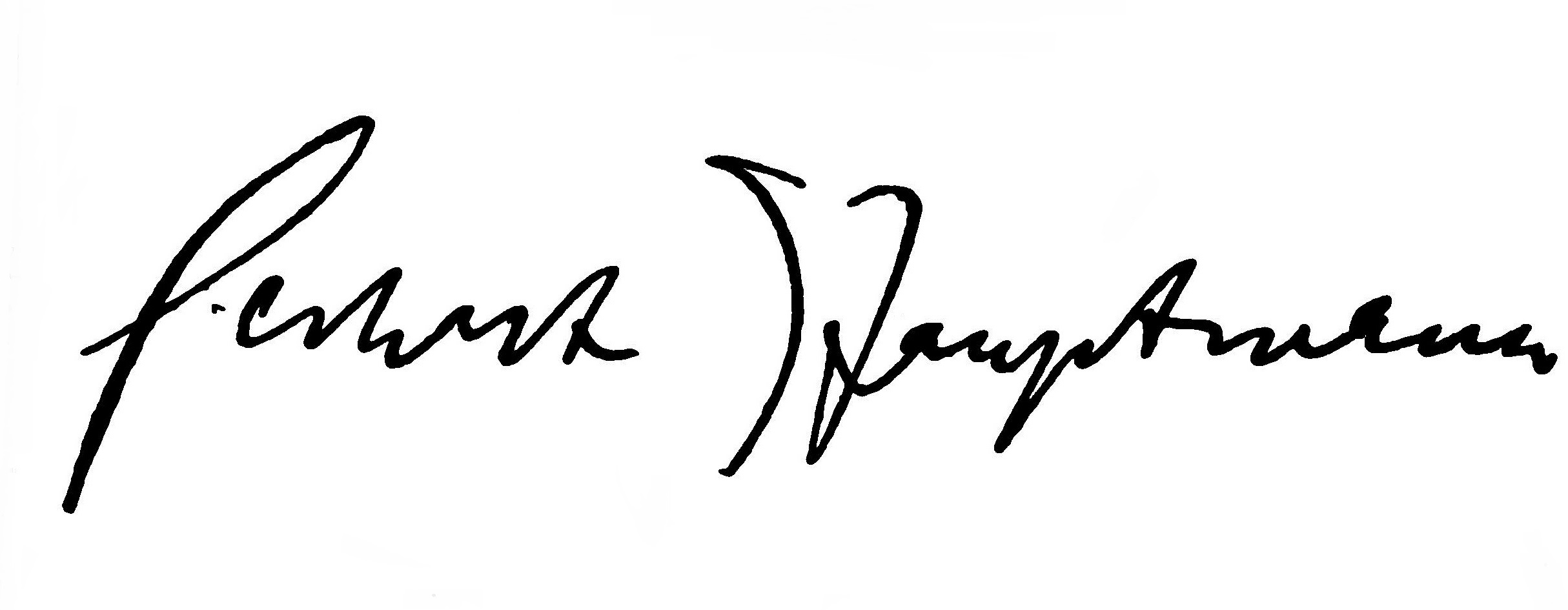

Gerhart Johann Robert Hauptmann (German: [ˈɡeːɐ̯haʁt ˈhaʊptman]; 15 November 1862 – 6 June 1946) was a German dramatist and novelist. He is counted among the most important promoters of literary naturalism, though he integrated other styles into his work as well. He received the Nobel Prize in Literature in 1912.

== Life ==
=== Childhood and youth ===
Gerhart Hauptmann was born in 1862 in Obersalzbrunn, now known as Szczawno-Zdrój, in Lower Silesia (then a part of the Kingdom of Prussia, now a part of Poland). His parents were Robert and Marie Hauptmann, who ran a hotel in the area. As a youth, Hauptmann had a reputation of being loose with the truth. His elder brother was Carl Hauptmann.

Beginning in 1868, he attended the village school and then, in 1874, the Realschule in Breslau for which he had only barely passed the qualifying exam. Hauptmann had difficulties adjusting himself to his new surroundings in the city. He lived, along with his brother Carl, in a somewhat run-down student boarding house before finding lodging with a pastor.

He ran into problems with the Prussian-influenced school. Above all were the strictness of the teachers and the better treatment of his noble classmates. His dislike and numerous illnesses kept him from attending class, which led to his having to repeat his first year. Over time, he came to appreciate Breslau because of the opportunity to visit the theater.

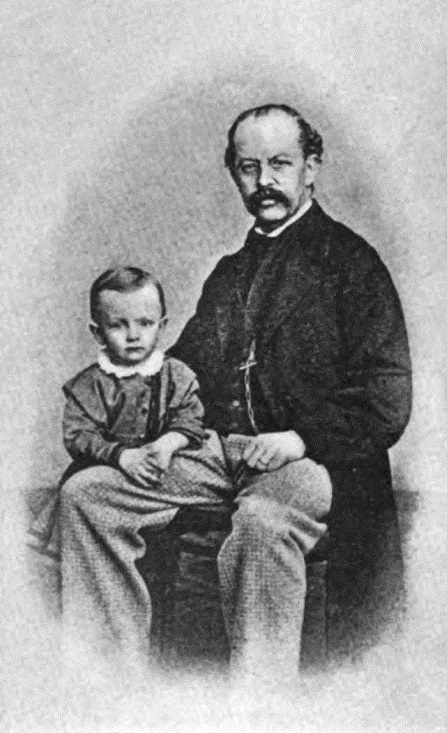
Hauptmann with his father, Robert.

In the spring of 1878, Hauptmann left the Realschule to learn agriculture on his uncle's farm in Lohnig (today Łagiewniki Średzkie in Gmina Udanin, Poland). After a year and a half, however, he had to break off his training. He was not physically prepared for the work and he had contracted a life-threatening lung ailment that troubled him for the next twenty months.

=== Studies and life as a sculptor ===
After he failed to pass an officer entry exam for the Prussian Army, Hauptmann entered the sculpture school at the Royal Art and Vocational School in Breslau in 1880. There he met Josef Block who became a lifelong friend. He was temporarily expelled for "poor behavior and insufficient diligence," but quickly reinstated on the recommendation of the sculptor and Professor Robert Härtel. Hauptmann left the school in 1882.

For his brother's wedding, he wrote a short play, Liebesfrühling, which was performed on the night before. Also at the wedding, he met the bride's sister, Marie Thienemann. They became secretly engaged and she began supporting him financially, which enabled him to begin a semester of philosophy and literary history at the University of Jena, which he soon quit.

After he left Jena, Marie financed a Mediterranean trip, which he undertook with his brother Carl. There he decided to settle in Rome as a sculptor, but with little success. His attempt to establish himself as part of Rome's German expatriate community also failed and his large clay sculpture of a German warrior collapsed. Hauptmann returned disappointed to Germany, where he began a brief stint at the Royal Academy in Dresden before beginning to study history at the University of Berlin. While there, he devoted his interests to the theater rather than to his studies. In 1891 he moved to Schreiberhau in Silesia.

=== Marriage and beginning as a writer ===
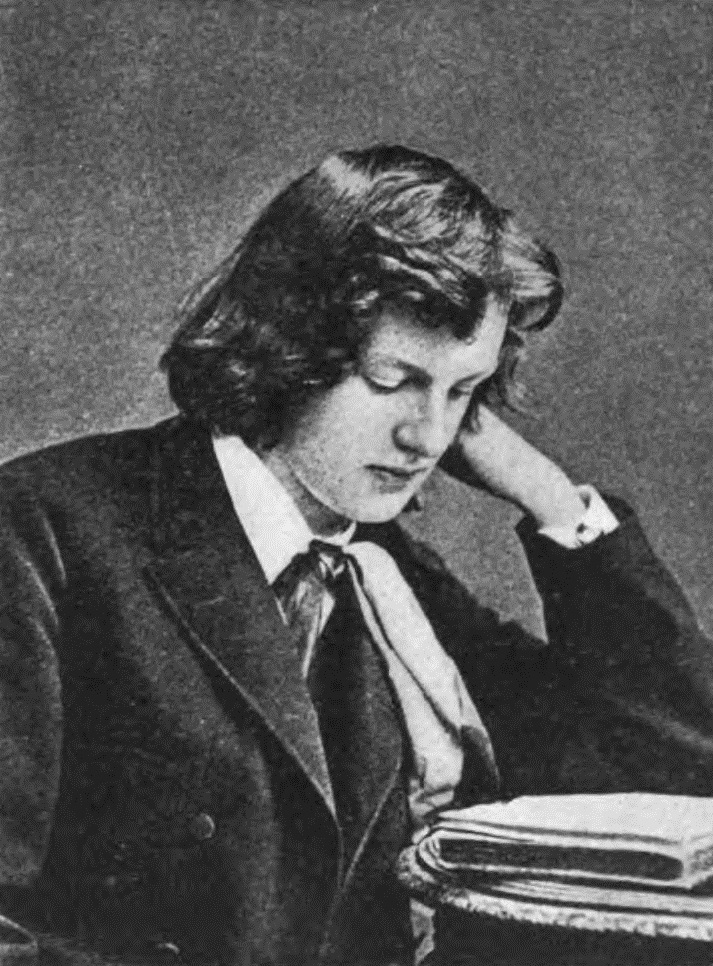
Hauptmann at the age of seventeen.

Hauptmann married Marie Thienemann in Radebeul on 5 May 1885. In July, they took their honeymoon to Rügen along with Carl and his wife, Marie's sister, Martha. They visited the island of Hiddensee, which would become a favorite retreat of Hauptmann's. Because the city air bothered Gerhart's lungs, the couple spent the first four years of their marriage in the town of Erkner, where their three sons were born. In 1889, they moved to Charlottenburg in Berlin. There he joined the naturalist literary club "Durch", which included among others Karl Bleibtreu and Wilhelm Bölsche.

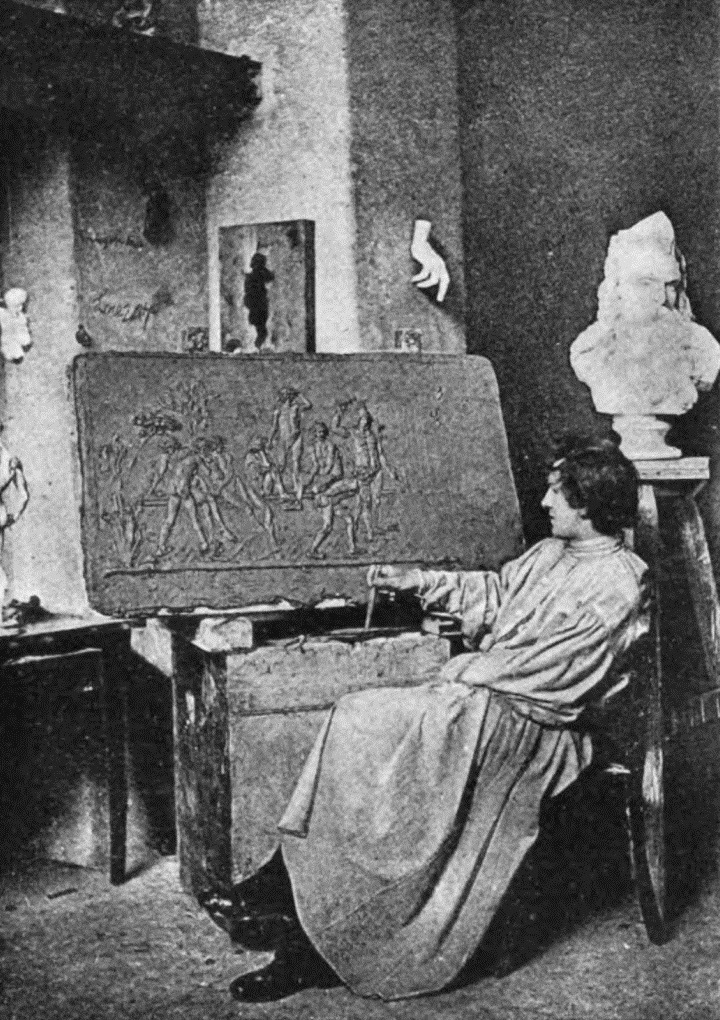
Hauptmann at his atelier in Rome.

During this period he began to write. His 1887 novella Bahnwärter Thiel was published the following year. His first play, Before Sunrise, was first staged in 1889, directed by Otto Brahm. It inaugurated the naturalistic movement in modern German literature. It was followed by The Reconciliation (1890), Lonely People (1891) and The Weavers (1892), a powerful drama depicting the rising of the Silesian weavers in 1844, for which he is best known outside of Germany. His work also included comedies, including Colleague Crampton (1891) and The Beaver Coat (1893).

In 1893, he also took actress Margarete Marschalk as his lover. In order to get some distance, Marie moved to the US with their sons. Hauptmann prepared the first French performance of his play The Assumption of Hannele and then went after Marie, without even staying for the premiere. The rift, however, was not to be bridged. After several years of separation, the marriage was ended in July 1904. However, Marie continued to live in the villa Hauptmann had built in Dresden.

=== Recognition and World War I ===
From 1901, Hauptmann lived with Margarete Marschalk in Agnetendorf (today Jagniątków in Poland). He called it "the mystical protective sheathing of my soul". In the preceding year, Margarete had borne him a son, Benvenuto. In September 1904, they were married; this second marriage lasted until his death, though it was thrown into a serious crisis in 1905 and 1906 by his affair with a 16-year-old actress, Ida Orloff.

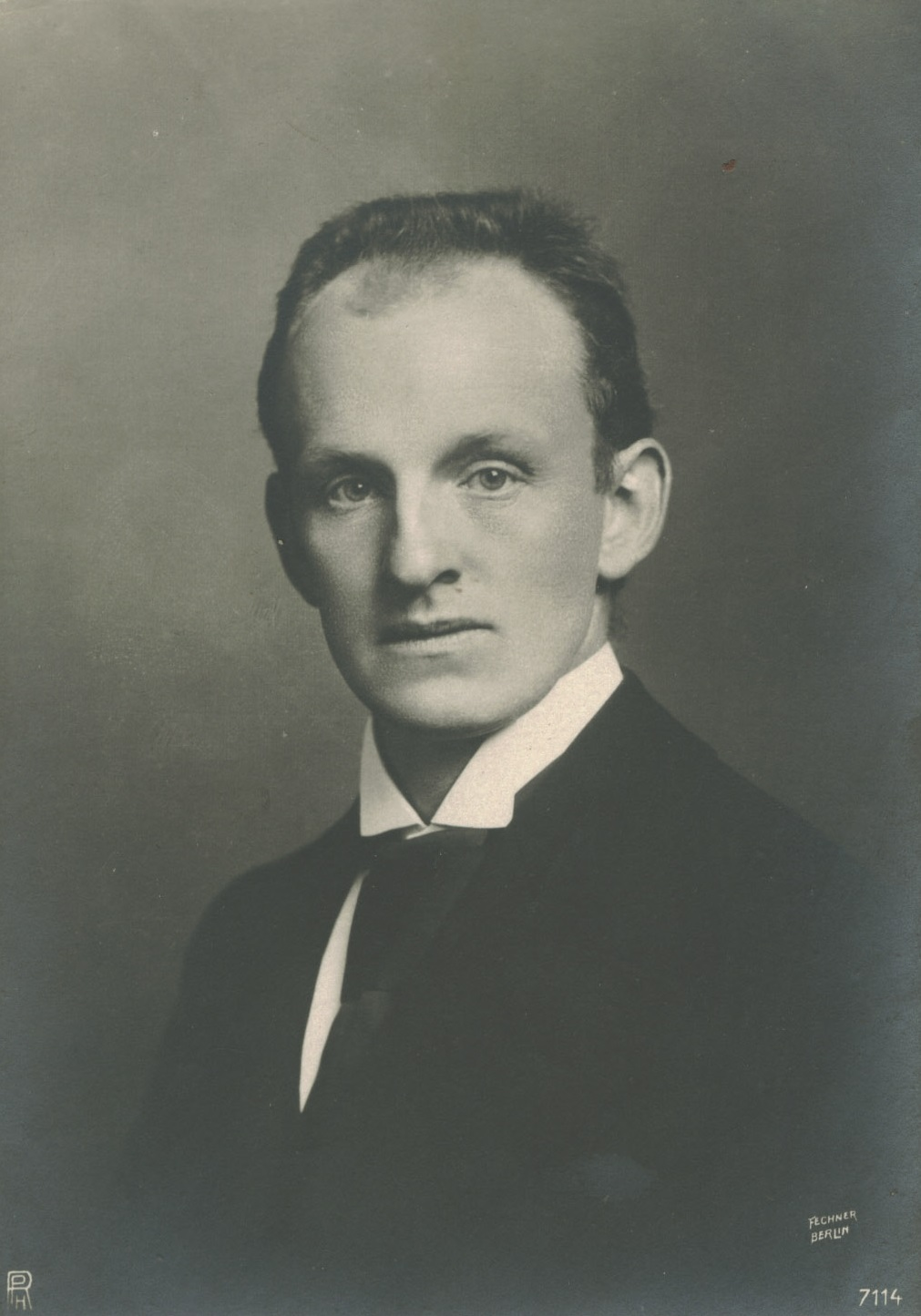
Portrait of Hauptmann, by Wilhelm Fechner, c. 1900.

In 1910, Hauptmann's first full-length novel was published, The Fool in Christ, Emanuel Quint, which told the story of a wandering preacher who mixed sun worship with Christianity. His 1912 novel, Atlantis, became the basis for a Danish silent film of the same name. The novel was written one month before the RMS Titanic disaster, and the film's 1913 release was less than one year after the event.

The storyline for both involved a romance aboard a doomed ocean liner, and the similarity to the disaster became obvious. This coincidental untimeliness caused the film to be banned in Norway, due to perceived insensitivity. Nevertheless, excited by the possibilities of this new medium, Hauptmann wrote several screenplays, none of which were ever filmed.

Around the turn of the century, Hauptmann began to receive official recognition. Three times he was awarded the Austrian Franz-Grillparzer-Preis. He also received honorary doctorates from Worcester College at Oxford in 1905 and from the University of Leipzig in 1909. In 1912, he was awarded the Nobel Prize in Literature "primarily in recognition of his fruitful, varied and outstanding production in the realm of dramatic art", after he had been nominated in that year by Erich Schmidt, member of the Prussian Academy of Science.

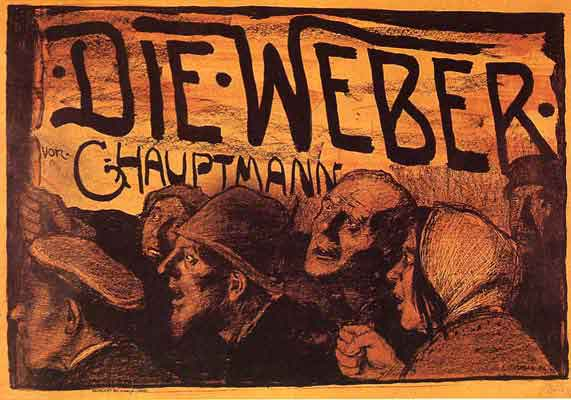
Color lithographic poster for The Weavers by Emil Orlik from 1897.

Kaiser Wilhelm II, however, did not care for the "social democratic" poet. He vetoed the awarding of the 1896 Schiller Preis (for The Assumption of Hannele) and at the instigation of his son, Crown Prince Wilhelm, in 1913, a Breslau production of Hauptmann's play Commemoration Masque (Festspiel in deutschen Reimen) was canceled, because in it the hundredth anniversary of the Liberation of Germany from Napoleon was depicted with a pacifistic rather than patriotic tone. However, the very same Hauptmann who had criticized militarism in the Masque, the very next year was among those who supported the war.

Hauptmann signed the Manifesto of the Ninety-Three, a manifesto signed by 93 German scientists, scholars and artists, declaring their unequivocal support of German military actions at the beginning of World War I. He published supportive poems (many of which read as unintentional satires and which he later crossed out in the manuscript).

In 1915, Wilhelm II awarded him the Order of the Red Eagle, Fourth Class. After Germany's military defeat and the fall of the monarchy, Hauptmann fled to the pacifist colony Monte Verità in Locarno, Switzerland. Several years later, he wrote Till Eulenspiegel, a poetic memorial to Hans Paasche, the pacifist and reformer who was assassinated by ultra-nationalists.

=== Representative poet of Germany ===
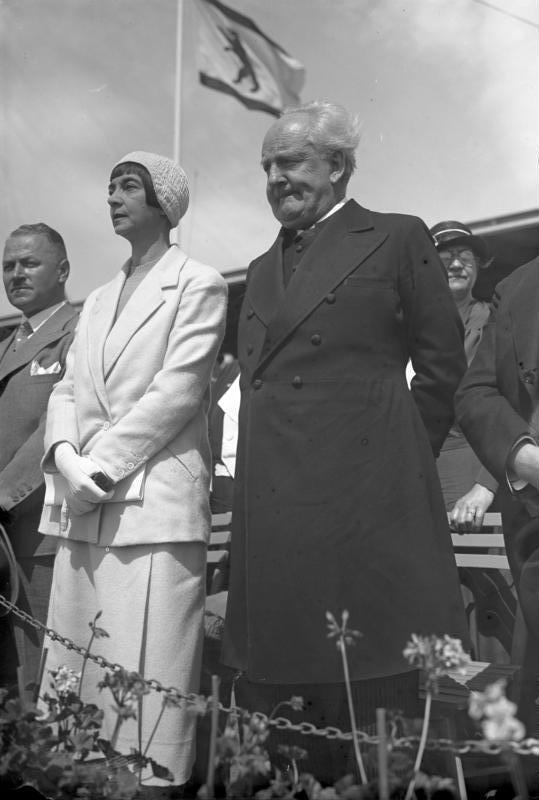
Hauptmann with his wife at the celebrations for his 70th birthday, 1932

In 1918, he joined a declaration, signed by a number of German intellectuals and published in the Berliner Tageblatt newspaper, showing solidarity with the Republic. During the early years of the republic, he was considered as a candidate for the Reichspräsident and offered the position of Reichskanzler, which he turned down.

In the following years, he was the first recipient of the Adlerschild des Deutschen Reiches (The Eagle Shield of the German Reich) an award for scholarly or artistic achievement. During this period, the demand for Hauptmann's work had declined, to the point where, in order to maintain his lifestyle, he had begun to do films and serializations. Despite this, he continued to enjoy popularity. He was seen abroad as the representative of German Literature. In 1932, in honor of the centenary of Goethe's death, he went on a lecture tour of the United States and was awarded and honorary doctorate from Columbia University. In addition he was awarded the Goethe Prize of the city of Frankfurt am Main.

On his 70th birthday, he was awarded several honorary citizenships. There were countless exhibitions and performances of his work, many with well-known performers. Max Reinhardt played the lead in the premiere of Hauptmann's new play Before Sunset. From 1926 to 1943, Hauptmann summered with his family in Hiddensee.

=== The Nazi era ===
After the Nazis came to power in Germany in 1933, Hauptmann signed a loyalty oath of the German Academy of Literature, a section of the Prussian Academy of Arts. In the summer of the same year, according to writer and historian Ernst Klee, he applied for membership in the Nazi party but his application was denied by the regional party office.

Hauptmann's copy of Mein Kampf, which can now be found in the Hauptmann collection at the Berlin State Library, was heavily annotated. He regarded himself as being fundamentally a poet, above the political fray; and certainly nothing from the Nazi ideology was incorporated into his works. However, he had earlier been a founding member of the eugenics organization the German Society for Racial Hygiene, in Berlin in 1905, and his play Before Sunrise is deeply concerned with hereditary alcoholism, a popular idea with eugenicists, and the main character rejects his fiancée due to concerns about his potential children's genetics.

Because Hauptmann remained highly regarded by the German people, the Nazis did everything to keep him from leaving the country, despite the emigration of many of his colleagues. At times he suffered from official disapproval. The censors of the Propaganda Minister Goebbels kept an eye on Hauptmann's work and even banned a new edition of his novella The Shot in the Park because it featured a black character. Hauptmann was told that reprinting was impossible because of a paper shortage. The film versions of The Beaver Coat and Before Sunrise were censored, and the film adaptation of Schluck and Jau was banned. For Hauptmann's 80th birthday, in 1942, representatives of the Nazi regime cooperated with honors, celebrations, and celebratory performances. Hauptmann was presented by his publisher with the first copy of his 17-volume Complete Works.

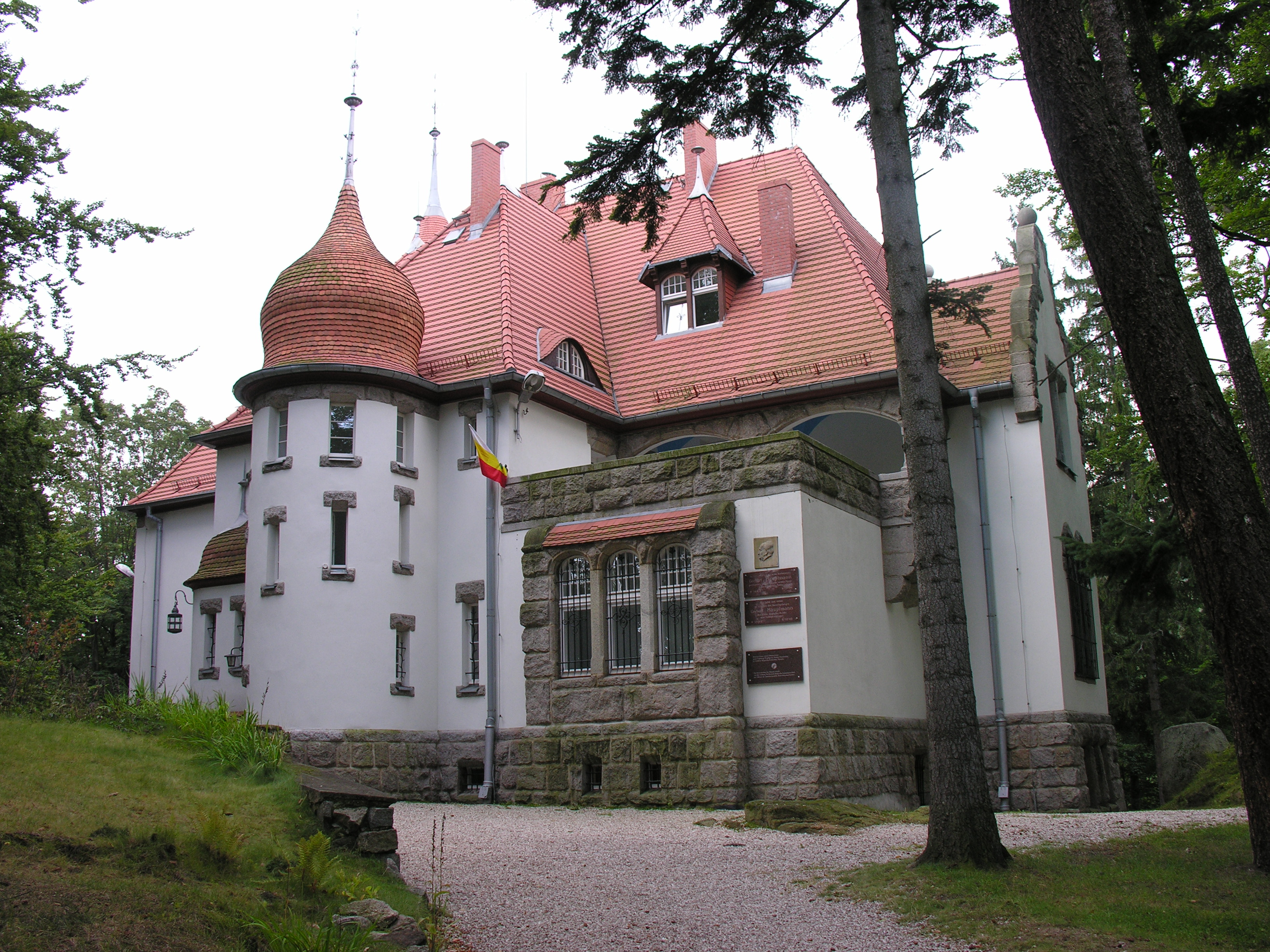
The Wiesenstein House in Jagniątków, pictured in 2005

Hauptmann lived through the end of World War II at his house, Wiesenstein. In 1944, he published his Atreus Tetralogy, which he had been working on for four years. It comprises Iphigenia in Delphi, Iphigenia in Aulis, Agamemnon's Death, and Electra. In 1944, Hauptmann's name was included in the Gottbegnadeten list (the "God-gifted list"), a list of artists considered crucial to the German culture, who were therefore exempt from mobilization in the war effort. He was one of the six most important writers in the special list of the "irreplaceable artists.".

During the bombing of Dresden, Hauptmann was staying at a Dresden sanatorium due to severe pneumonia. He said of the inferno, "Whoever had forgotten how to cry learned again at the destruction of Dresden. I stand at the end of my life and envy my dead comrades, who were spared this experience."

After the war, Silesia, where Hauptmann was living, became part of Poland, but Hauptmann was temporarily allowed to stay due to a letter of protection. Then, on 7 April 1946, he was informed by the Soviet military authorities that the Polish government was insisting on his resettlement. Before his expulsion, he became very ill.

=== Death ===
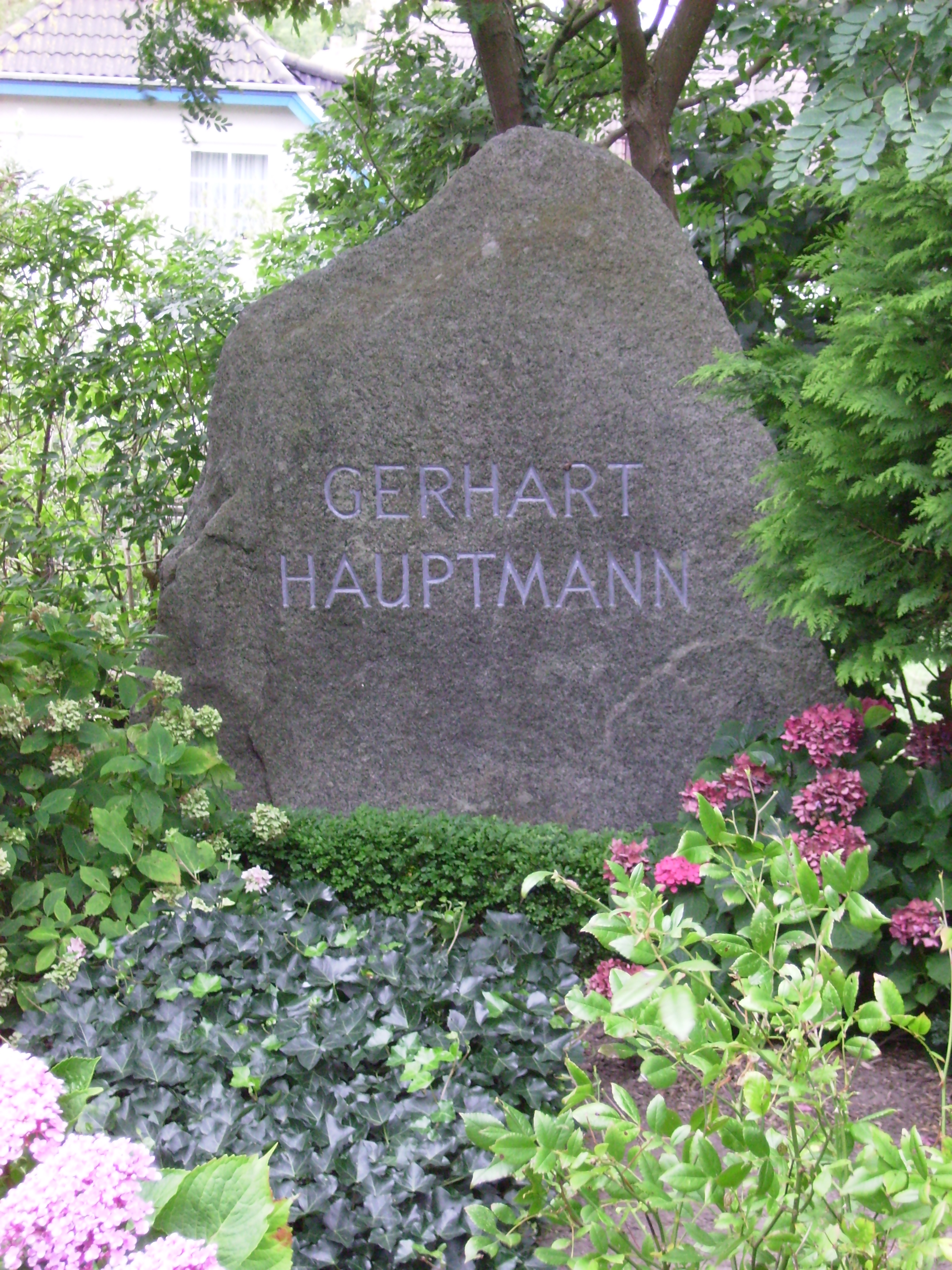
Hauptmann's grave in Hiddensee, Germany

At the beginning of May 1946, Hauptmann learned that the Polish government was insisting on the expulsion of all Germans without exception. On 6 June, he died of bronchitis in Agnieszków (present-day Jagniątków, a part of Hirschberg im Riesengebirge, now Jelenia Góra). His last words were reported to be, "Am I still in my house?" Despite his final wishes, as expressed in his last will, Hauptmann was not buried at his home.

An official letter from the Soviet Administration in favor of the writer, who was highly regarded in the Soviet Union, proved ineffective, though the family was permitted to take its belongings. Only an hour after his death, the local militia had gathered outside the window directly under his deathbed and banging pots and pans and blowing whistles and trumpets.

== Funeral ==
At a funeral service held in Stralsund, near Hauptmann's summer home on Hiddensee island, Wilhelm Pieck, then co-chairman of the Socialist Unity Party of Germany in the Soviet occupation zone of Germany spoke, along with poet Johannes R. Becher, and Soviet official Sergei Ivanovich Tiulpanov all spoke.

On the morning of 28 July, 52 days after his death, he was buried before sunrise at the cemetery in Hiddensee. His widow mixed a small sack of earth from the Riesengebirge/Karkonosze Mountains (Krkonoše) in Silesia with the sandy soil of the Baltic coast where he was buried. In 1951, a granite block was unveiled as the grave stone. It bears, as per Hauptmann's wish, only his name. In 1983, his wife Margarete's remains were moved to lie beside her husband's, though she had died in 1957.

== Work ==
=== Influences ===
Hauptmann first encountered the various representatives of the naturalist movement through the avant-garde society "Durch" in 1885, which was an important influence. The society hearkened back to historical examples from the Sturm und Drang movement, especially the circle centered on the Hart Brothers up until the Vormärz period before the revolutions of 1848.

At their meetings, aesthetic questions about idealism, Realism and the naturalist movement were discussed. Hauptmann gave a lecture about the theretofore largely forgotten poet and dramatist Georg Büchner. With that, he also established his naturalistic orientation.

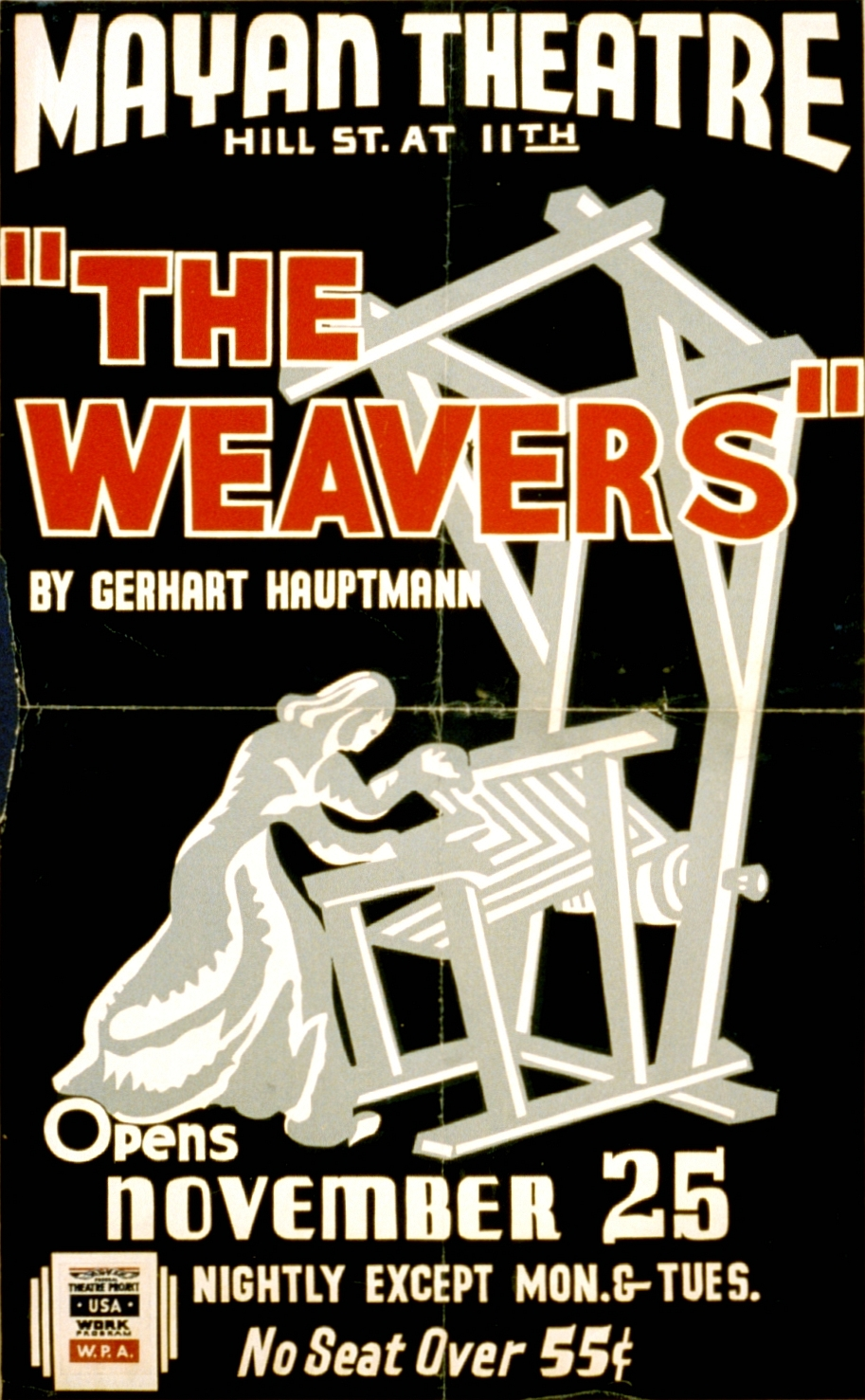
Poster for a Federal Theatre Project presentation of The Weavers in Los Angeles (1937)

At the end of the 1880s, he was confronted with the incipient anti-socialist movement. The first of the Anti-Socialist Laws was passed in 1878 and strengthened in 1887. Hauptmann was in 1887 called before the court in Breslau, because he had been a follower of the "Icharians," whose ideas hearkened back to the ideas of French communist Etienne Cabet.

He sought refuge in his brother's house in Zurich in order to avoid prosecution. While there he encountered psychiatrist August Forel and the preacher Johannes Guttzeit, whose ideas influenced Before Sunrise. Hauptmann's early dream of a utopian-socialist community were further fed by his encounter with the poet Gusto Gräser, whose communal colony Hauptmann would visit several times in 1919. The story The Heretic of Soana, the novel The Fool in Christ Emmanuel Quint, and the final chapter of Till Eulenspiegel deal with his experience of a Dionysian-Jesuanic itinerant prophet.

=== Naturalism ===
Hauptmann began producing naturalistic works in Zurich. From there, he sent the manuscript of Bahnwärter Thiel, his first naturalistic work, to Munich to be read by the critic Michael Georg Conrad. Hauptmann's 1889 play Before Sunrise caused one of the largest scandals in German theater history. The bourgeois audience was shocked by the frank depictions of alcoholism and sexuality.

According to Franz-Josef Payrhuber, Before Sunrise was an epoch-making work, but it is not the representative example of naturalistic drama, that label would go to Die Familie Selicke by Arno Holz and Johannes Schlaf. Hauptmann however did have an important role, with the support of Otto Brahm, in establishing naturalistic drama on the German stage. Theaters under Brahm's leadership premiered 17 of Hauptmann's plays. Those plays, and the numerous performances across Germany, gave Naturalism its first broad exposure and social impact.

With his most important play, The Weavers, which he had already been contemplating during his stay in Zurich, Hauptmann achieved world renown and reached the high point of his Naturalistic phase.

=== Critical reception ===
Hauptmann's early work received differing reviews. Conservative circles and also the government were not excited about his socially critical dramas, which made itself felt through censorship. His position in the opposition raised his profile in progressive, intellectual circles, which appreciated these aspects of his work. After many naturalistic-influenced works, Hauptmann's style changed and he grew increasingly well-received among the educated and upper classes.

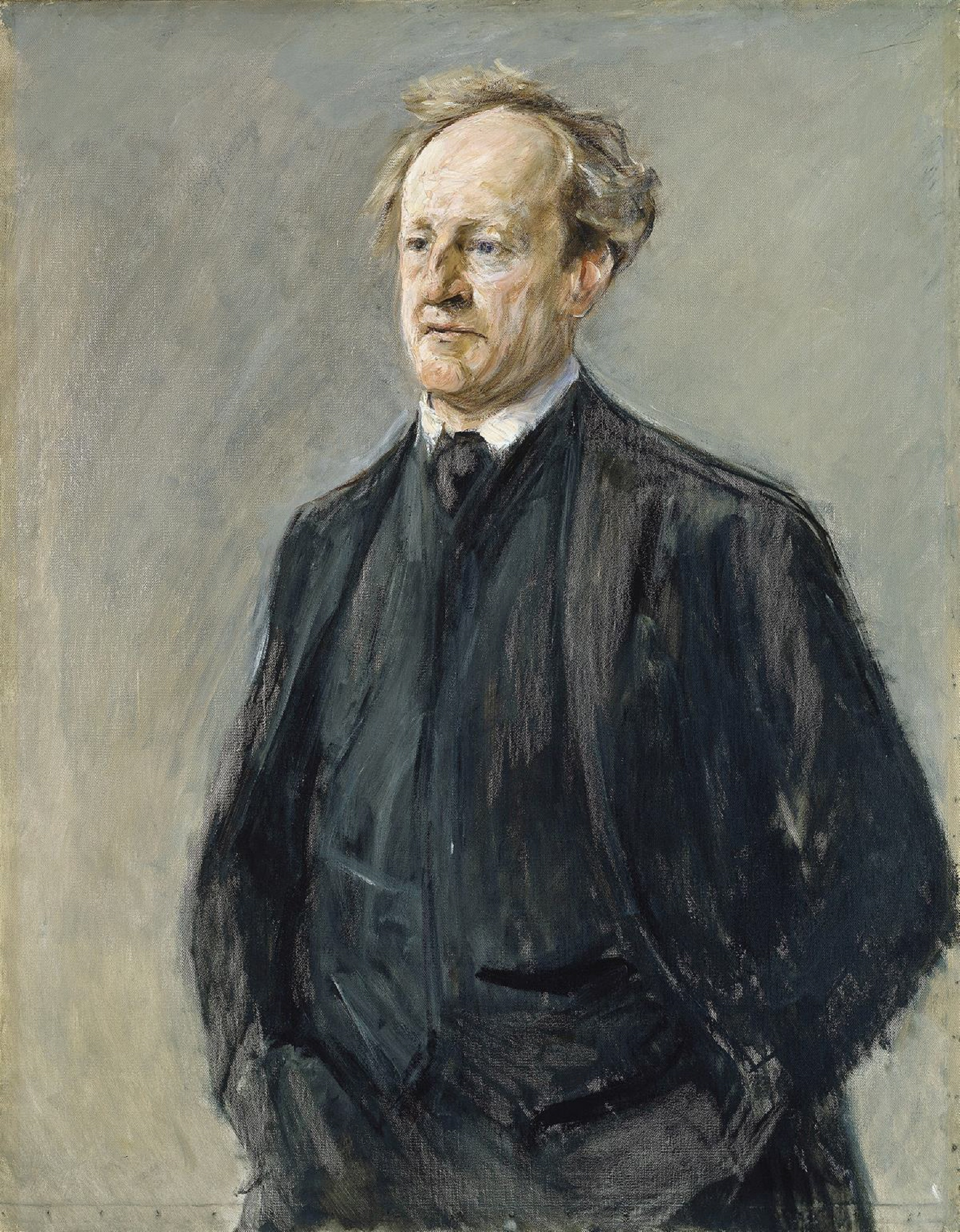
Hauptmann, by Max Liebermann, 1912.

Nevertheless, he was still in demand as a writer and was regarded abroad as the representative poet of Germany. The Hungarian philosopher and literature critic, Georg Lukacs later called Hauptmann the "representative poet of bourgeois Germany," by which he did not mean to underscore Hauptmann's prominent position. Rather, he expressed displeasure with Hauptmann's fickleness and lack of attachment to his "revolutionary beginnings." Despite his preeminence, the sale of his works steadily declined as other poets and playwrights took the spotlight.

Hauptmann had taken up a lavish lifestyle, lived in expensive hotels, often received guests, and took trips to Italy. He summered in his large house on the Hiddensee, that Günter Kunert called a "do-it-yourself Olympia." Thomas Mann referred to this lavish lifestyle when he called him in 1922 the "King of the Republic." Mann met Hauptmann at an Alpine resort and wrote to his brother, "I hobnob every evening with Hauptmann, who is a really good fellow." In addition Mann adapted some of Hauptmann's traits for his character Mynheer Peeperkorn in his book The Magic Mountain.

When Hauptmann continued to live in Germany after the Nazis came to power, they attempted to use Hauptmann for their own purposes. Various works that displeased the party leaders were banned but others continued to be performed. At his 80th birthday, in 1942 he was honored by the government with a festival and tributes, which he accepted. Hauptmann's ebb-and-flow character was highlighted in William L. Shirer's The Rise and Fall of the Third Reich. Shirer offered in a first-person account:

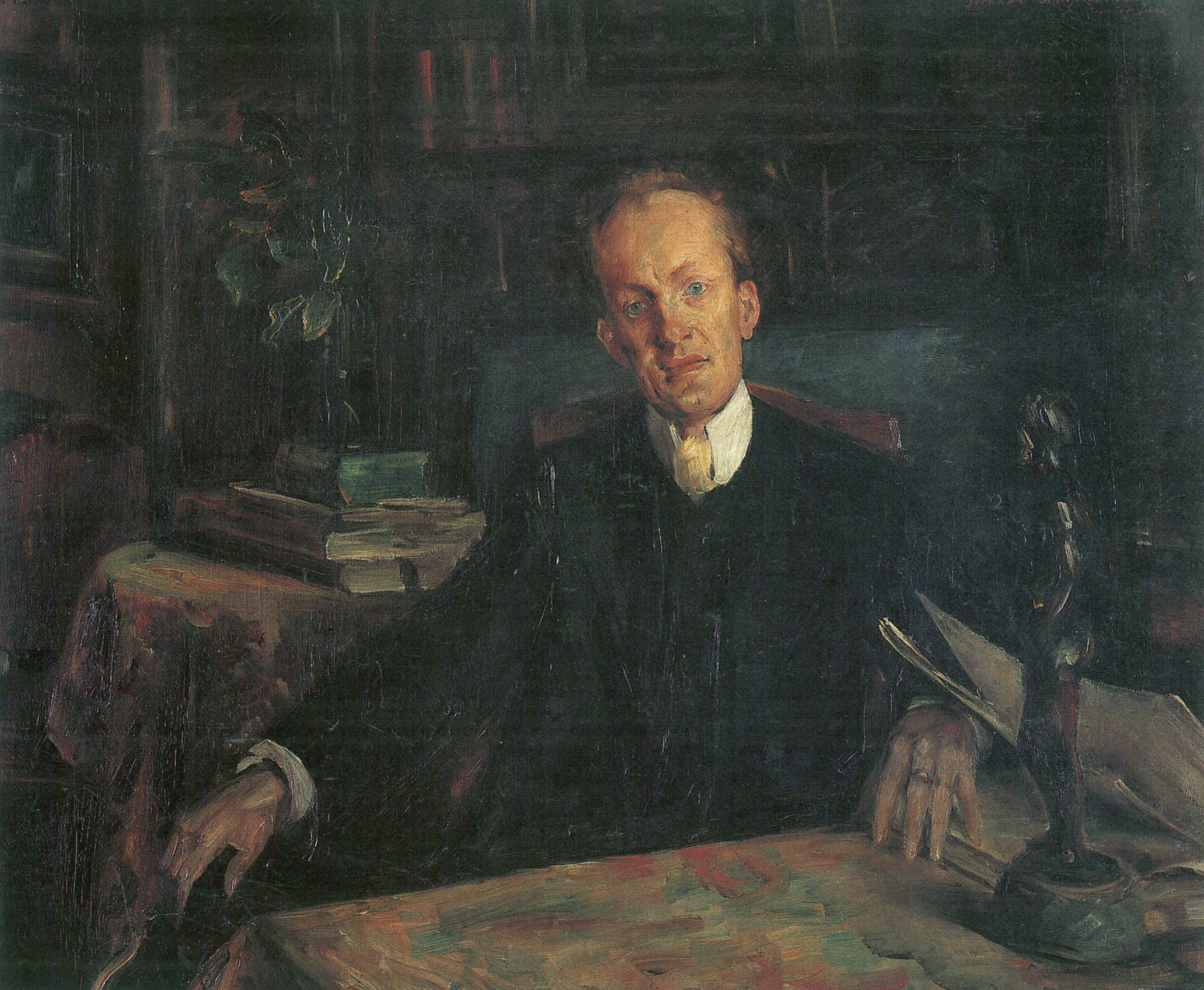
Portrait of Gerhart Hauptmann by Lovis Corinth (1900), oil on canvas, 87 x 106 cm., Kunsthalle Mannheim, Germany

Because he had been an ardent Socialist his plays had been banned from the imperial theaters during Kaiser Wilhelm II's time. During the Republic he had been the most popular playwright in Germany, and indeed he retained that position in the Third Reich. His plays continued to be produced. I shall never forget the scene at the close of the first night of his last play, The Daughter of the Cathedral, when Hauptmann, a venerable figure with his flowing white hair tumbling down over his black cape, strode out of the theater arm in arm with Dr. Goebbels and [Hans] Johst. He, like so many other eminent Germans, had made his peace with Hitler, and Goebbels, a shrewd man, had made much effective propaganda out of it, tirelessly reminding the German people and the outside world that Germany's greatest living playwright, a former Socialist and the champion of the common man, had not only remained in the Third Reich but had continued to write and have his plays produced. How sincere or opportunistic or merely changeable this aging playwright was may be gathered from what happened after the war. The American authorities, believing that Hauptmann had served the Nazis too well, banned his plays from the theaters in their sector in West Berlin. Whereupon the Russians invited him to Berlin, welcomed him as a hero and staged a gala cycle of his plays in East Berlin. And on 6 October 1945, Hauptmann sent a message to the Communist-dominated "Kulturbund for the Democratic Revival of Germany" wishing it well and expressing the hope that it would succeed in bringing about a "spiritual rebirth" of the German people.

After his death, the fame he had enjoyed in life began to fade. His reputation was further diminished by his uncritical attitude toward the Nazis. Nevertheless, centenary celebrations were held in many German cities in 1962, and his works continued to be performed on West German stages into the 1970s, especially Der Biberpelz and Die Ratten.

== Publications ==
Novels

- Der Narr in Christo Emanuel Quint (1910)
- Atlantis (1912)
- Wanda a.k.a. Der Dämon (1926)
- Die Insel der grossen Mutter (1928)
- Um Volk und Geist (1932)
- Im Wirbel der Berufung (1936)
- Das Abenteuer meiner Jugend (1937)

Short novels

- Fasching (1887)
- Bahnwärter Thiel (1888)
- Der Ketzer von Soana (1918)
- Phantom (1923)
- Marginalien (selected works, reports: 1887–1927)
- Das Meerwunder (1934)
- Sonnen (1938)
- Der Schuss im Park (1939)

Verse novels

- Promethidenlos (1885)
- Anna (1921)
- Die blaue Blume (1924)
- Till Eulenspiegel (1927)
- Der grosse Traum (1912–42)

Plays

- Before Sunrise (Vor Sonnenaufgang, 1889)
- The Reconciliation (Das Friedensfest, 1890)
- Lonely People (Einsame Menschen, 1891)
- The Weavers (Die Weber, 1892)
- Colleague Crampton (College Cramption, 1892)
- The Beaver Coat (Der Biberpelz, 1893)
- The Assumption of Hannele (Hanneles Himmelfahrt, 1893)
- Florian Geyer (1896)
- Elga (1896)
- Helios (1896) fragment
- The Sunken Bell (Die versunkene Glocke, 1896)
- Pastoral (Das Hirtenlied, 1898) fragment
- Drayman Henschel (Fuhrmann Henschel, 1898)
- Schluck and Jau (Schluck und Jau, 1900)
- Michael Kramer (1900)
- The Conflagration (Der rote Hahn, 1901)
- Henry of Auë (Der arme Heinrich, 1902)
- Rose Bernd (1903)
- And Pippa Dances (Und Pippa tanzt!, 1906)
- The Maidens of the Mount (Die Jungfern von Bischofsberg, 1907)
- Charlemagne's Hostage (Kaiser Karls Geisel, 1908)
- The White Savior or Montezuma (Der weiße Heiland, 1908)
- Griselda (1909)
- The Rats (Die Ratten, 1911)
- Gabriel Schilling's Flight (Gabriel Schillings Flucht, 1912)
- Peter Brauer (1912)
- Commemoration Masque (Festspiel in deutschen Reimen, 1913)
- The Bow of Odysseus (Der Bogen des Odysseus, 1914)
- Magnus Garbe (1914, second version: 1942)
- Indipohdi (1920)
- Veland (1925)
- Herbert Engelmann (1921–26)
- Spuk (two plays: Die schwarze Maske and Hexenritt, 1928)
- Die goldene Harfe (1933)
- Hamlet in Wittenberg (Hamlet im Wittenberg, 1935)
- Die Finsternisse (1937)
- Ulrich von Lichtenstein (1936–37)
- Die Tochter der Kathedrale (1935–38)
- Die Atriden-Tetralogie:
1. Iphigenie in Aulis (1944)
2. Agamemnons Tod (1948; written in 1942)
3. Elektra (1948; written in 1944)
4. Iphigenie in Delphi (1941)

In English translation

- Hannele. A Dream Poem (1894)
- Lonely Lives (1898)
- The Sunken Bell (1899).
- The Coming of Peace (1900)
- And Pippa Dances (1907)
- The Reconciliation (1910)
- The Fool in Christ, Emanuel Quint (1911)
- Atlantis (1912).
- Parsival (1915)
- The Dramatic Works:
  - Social Dramas (1912)
  - Social Dramas (1913)
  - Domestic Dramas (1914)
  - Symbolic and Legendary Dramas (1914)
  - Symbolic and Legendary Dramas (1915)
  - Later Dramas in Prose (1915)
  - Miscellaneous Dramas (1917)
- Phantom (1922)
- The Heretic of Soana (1923)
- Lineman Thiel and Other Tales (1989)

== See also ==
- 8381 Hauptmann, a minor planet discovered in 1992, named for Hauptmann
- Hauptmann (crater), a crater on Mercury, named for Hauptmann
