= Bahnwärter Thiel =

Bahnwärter Thiel may refer to:

- Bahnwärter Thiel (novella), a Naturalist novella by Gerhart Hauptmann
- Bahnwärter Thiel (club), a club in Munich, Germany
