= Femme fragile =

Portrayal of a woman as delicate, vulnerable and incapable

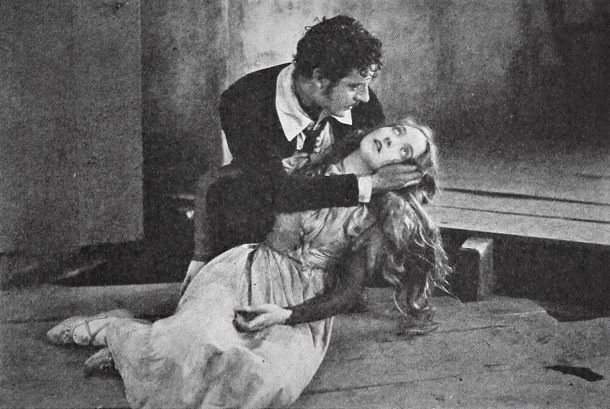
Still from the American drama film La Bohème (1926), starring Lillian Gish and John Gilbert. The frail Mimi dies from consumption.

Femme fragile (French: [fam fʁaʒil]; French for 'fragile woman') is a cultural and literary archetype that portrays women as delicate, vulnerable, and emotionally or psychologically fragile. Originating in literature, art, and social discourse, the concept often represents women as passive figures in need of protection, guidance, or rescue. She is a counterpart to the femme fatale; where the latter is self-assured and dangerous, the femme fragile is innocent, dependent, and susceptible to collapse under the weight of societal or personal pressures.

== Historical context and examples ==
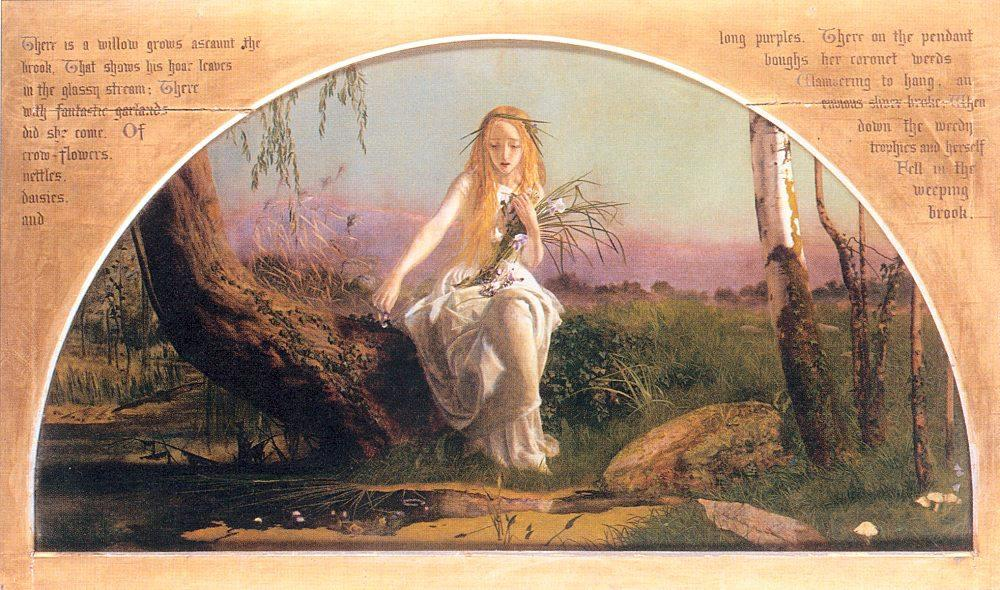
Ophelia (c. 1851-1853), Arthur Hughes. A childlike representation of a femme fragile

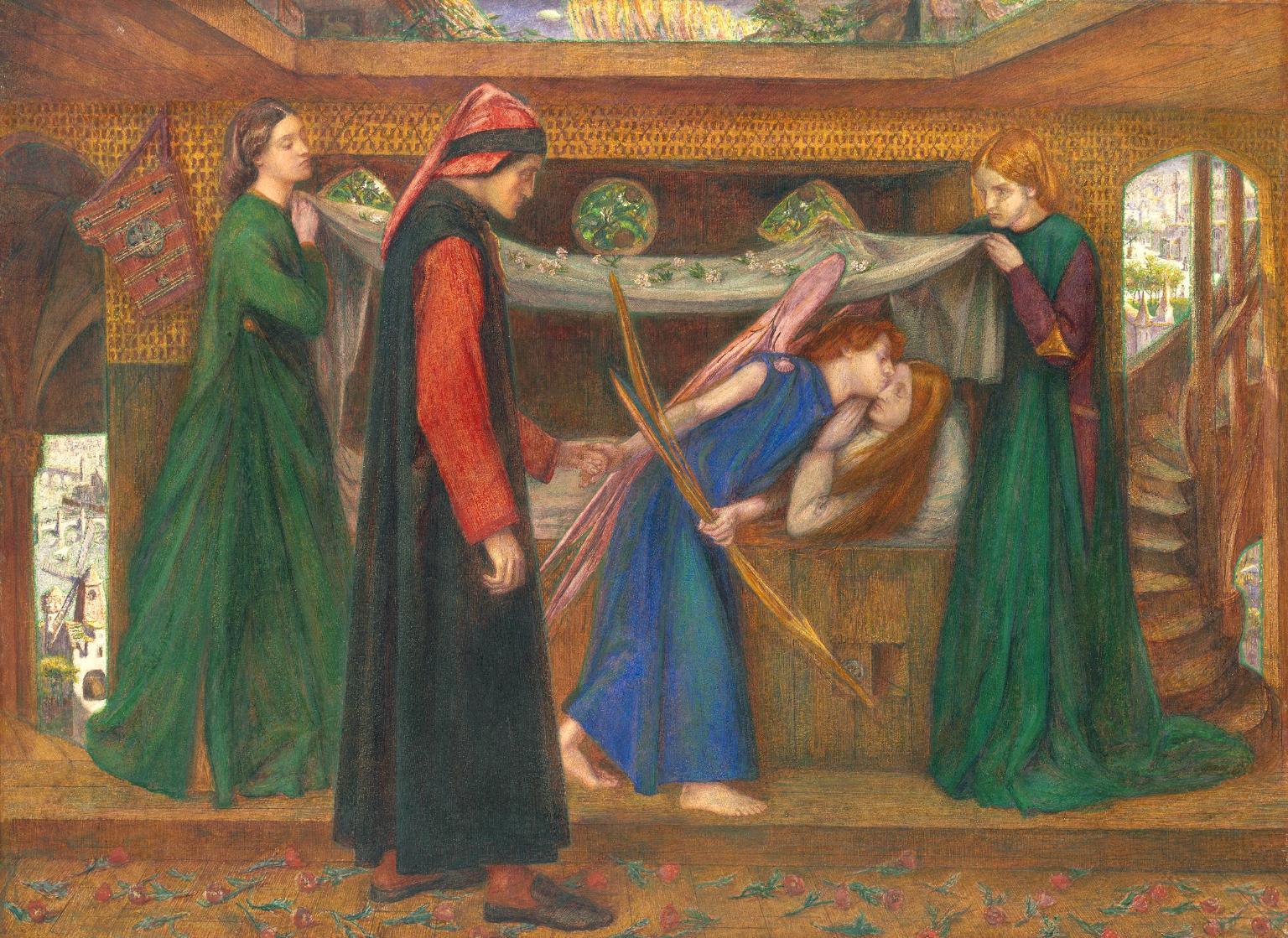
Dante's Dream at the Time of the Death of Beatrice (1856), Dante Gabriel Rossetti. Beatrice was a favourite virtuous woman for the Pre-Raphaelites.

The origins of the femme fragile can be traced back to the Romantic era, particularly in 19th-century European literature and art. During this period, women were frequently depicted as ethereal, sensitive beings, prone to illness, emotional breakdowns, and even death due to their fragile dispositions. These portrayals explored themes of femininity, virtue, and the limits of endurance in the face of a harsh world. The trope often involved self-sacrifice, with women driven to madness or despair by circumstances beyond their control. Femmes fragiles were also embodiments of virtue and grace.

Prominent literary examples include Ophelia from Shakespeare's Hamlet (c. 1600), whose emotional vulnerability ultimately leads to her tragic demise.

In Matthew Gregory Lewis's Gothic novel The Monk: A Romance (1796), Antonia—portrayed as innocent and timid—is contrasted with the seductive and manipulative femme fatale Matilda. Antonia is so virtuous that some have found her "deadly dull".

Edgar Allan Poe's Madeline Usher in "The Fall of the House of Usher" (1839) exemplifies the physical and mental fragility associated with the femme fragile model. Her "body had grown thin and weak" and she falls into cataleptic, deathlike trances, eventually appearing to die.

French literature also contributed significantly to the development of the form. Gustave Flaubert's Madame Bovary (1856) and Marcel Proust's writings portray women navigating emotional fragility within restrictive societal norms.

The Pre-Raphaelite painters frequently revisited the theme through figures such as Dante's Beatrice, idealised for her purity and early death. Operatic heroines like Violetta in Verdi's La Traviata (1853) and Mimi in Puccini's La bohème (1896) echo this tradition—fragile, self-sacrificing, and ultimately doomed.

In fin de siècle Germany and Austria, Ariane Thomalla attributes the representation of the femme fragile as the result of sexual repression, and a male reaction to the growing public voice, economic autonomy and political strength of women, perceived as a threat to the male ego. Authors of Viennese Modernism, such as Arthur Schnitzler, often employed the femme fragile in their works. In his play Professor Bernhardi (1912), a young woman is portrayed as emotionally sensitive and vulnerable to outside influence, while Fräulein Else (1924) features a naive protagonist struggling with societal and familial pressures. Similarly, Gerhart Hauptmann's Bahnwärter Thiel and Élémir Bourges's Le Crépuscule des dieux (1884) include women marked by physical weakness and psychological sensitivity.

By the late 19th and early 20th centuries, the archetype was deeply entwined with prevailing attitudes toward gender roles. Women were often depicted as inherently weaker, requiring protection from the harshness of the world. Their emotional fragility was portrayed as a natural extension of their biological and social roles as mothers and wives.

== Characteristics and representation ==
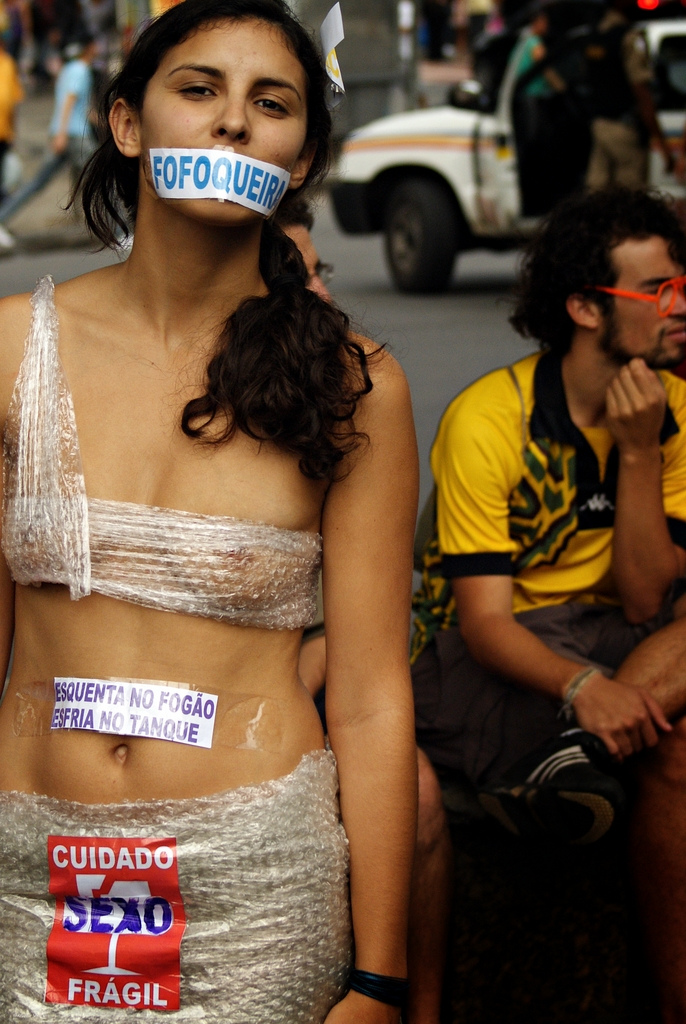
A woman protests at Marcha das Vadias (Slutwalk) in Brazil, 2012. She is wrapped in bubble wrap, and wears stickers that read: Cuidado, sexo frágil (Careful, fragile sex); esquenta no fogão, esfria no tanque (heat on the stove, cool tank); fofoqueira (gossip).

Physically, the femme fragile is often described as "delicately limbed," "tired," and "almost childlike" in appearance, with a complexion that suggests morbidity or sickness. Emotionally, she is passive, prone to breakdowns, and psychologically unstable, and frequently depicted suffering from anxiety, depression, or hysteria. She is dependent on male characters for guidance and emotional support, and often portrayed as incapable of making independent decisions. Her narratives centre on victimhood, self-sacrifice, and frequently, an early or tragic death.

Unlike the assertive, sexually empowered and often dangerous femme fatale, the femme fragile is seen as pure, morally upright, and helpless. While sometimes eliciting sympathy or compassion, her fragility can also provoke pity or even contempt, reinforcing the stereotype of women as inherently weak and in need of male protection. This can later turn to her becoming "an object of vicarious [male] visual and imagined pleasures".

== Modern interpretations and criticism of the concept ==
As views on gender evolved throughout the 20th and 21st centuries, feminist movements challenged the trope, calling attention to its limitations and the way it reinforced regressive stereotypes. Representations of women in literature and media gradually shifted toward complexity, strength, and independence, diminishing the dominance of the femme fragile as a default female model.

However, the femme fragile continues to appear in contemporary media, albeit in more nuanced and self-aware forms. Modern portrayals often use the archetype to explore mental health, trauma, and the pressures placed on women by society. Rather than celebrating fragility as inherent, contemporary narratives tend to frame it as the result of external expectations and inner conflict, often highlighting resilience and growth rather than helplessness. Despite its evolution, the femme fragile remains a subject of critique. Critics argue that it perpetuates harmful assumptions about women's emotional capacities and reinforces a cultural tendency to equate female vulnerability with weakness. Such portrayals can limit the representation of women by denying them agency and complexity, and by reducing their struggles to a simplistic stylistic device.

== See also ==
- Femme fatale
- Romanticism in literature
- Feminist literary criticism
- Gender role
