= Różana =

Różana may refer to the following places:

Poland

- Różana, Gmina Udanin, Środa County, Lower Silesian Voivodeship
- Różana, Wałbrzych County, Lower Silesian Voivodeship
- Różana, Ząbkowice County, Lower Silesian Voivodeship

Belarus

- Ruzhany (Polish: Różana), Brest Region
  - Ruzhany Palace
