= Jarosław, Lower Silesian Voivodeship =

Jarosław
- Village
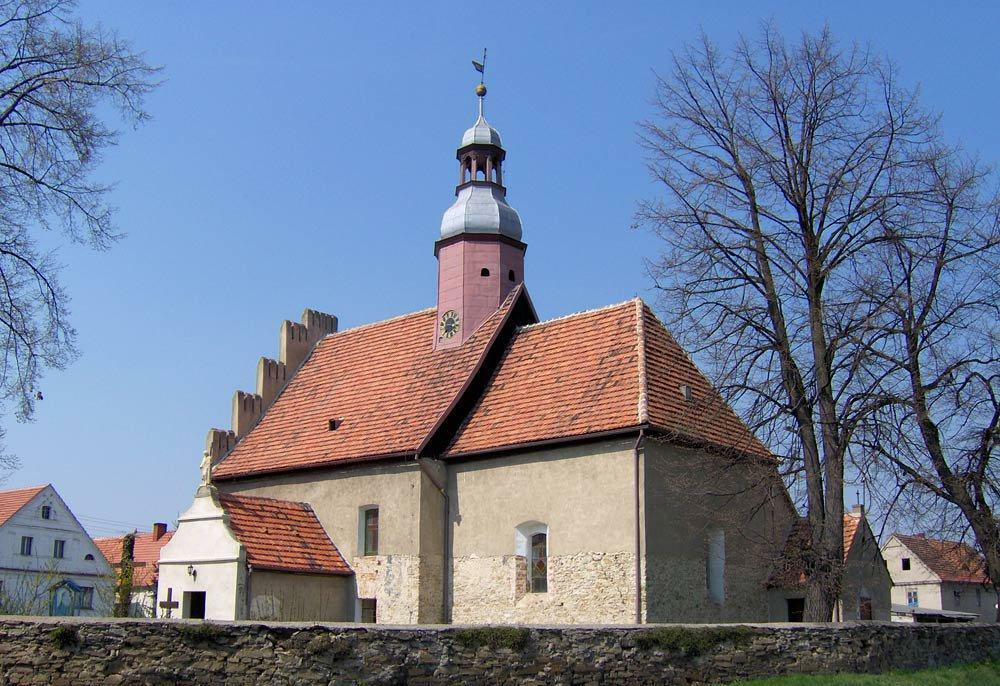
- Jarosław, Kościół Matki Boskiej Częstochowskiej - fotopolska.eu

- Location within Poland
- Coordinates: 51°04′13″N 16°31′38″E
- Country: Poland
- Voivodeship: Lower Silesian
- County: Środa
- Gmina: Udanin

Jarosław (Polish: [jaˈrɔswaf], German: Jerschendorf) is a village in the administrative district of Gmina Udanin, within Środa County, Lower Silesian Voivodeship, in south-western Poland.
