= Lusina, Lower Silesian Voivodeship =

Lusina
- Village
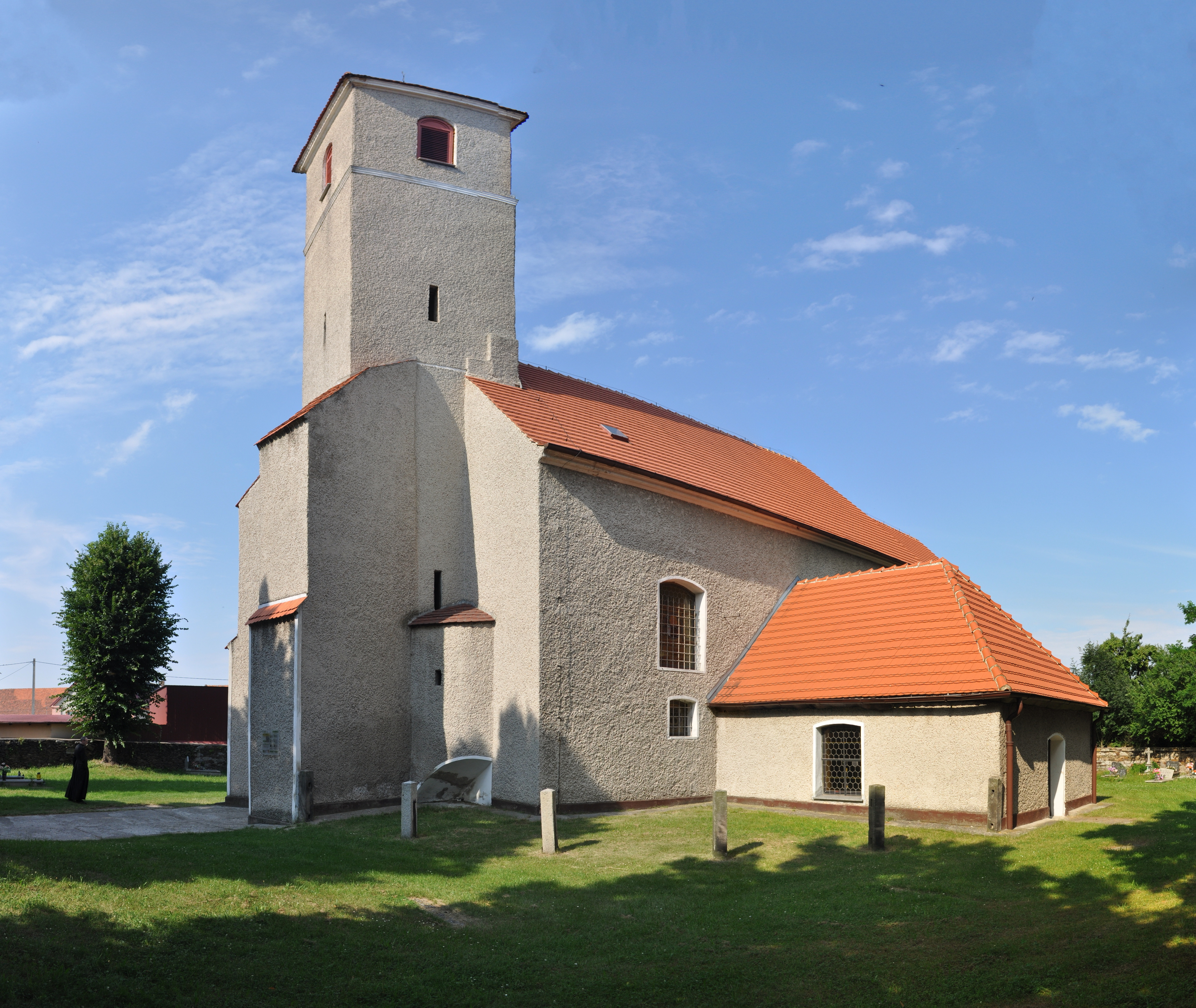
- Church in Lusina

- Location within Poland
- Coordinates: 51°01′03″N 16°23′57″E
- Country: Poland
- Voivodeship: Lower Silesian
- County: Środa
- Gmina: Udanin

Lusina [luˈɕina] (German: Lüssen) is a village in the administrative district of Gmina Udanin, within Środa County, Lower Silesian Voivodeship, in south-western Poland.
