= Karnice, Gmina Udanin =

Karnice
- Village
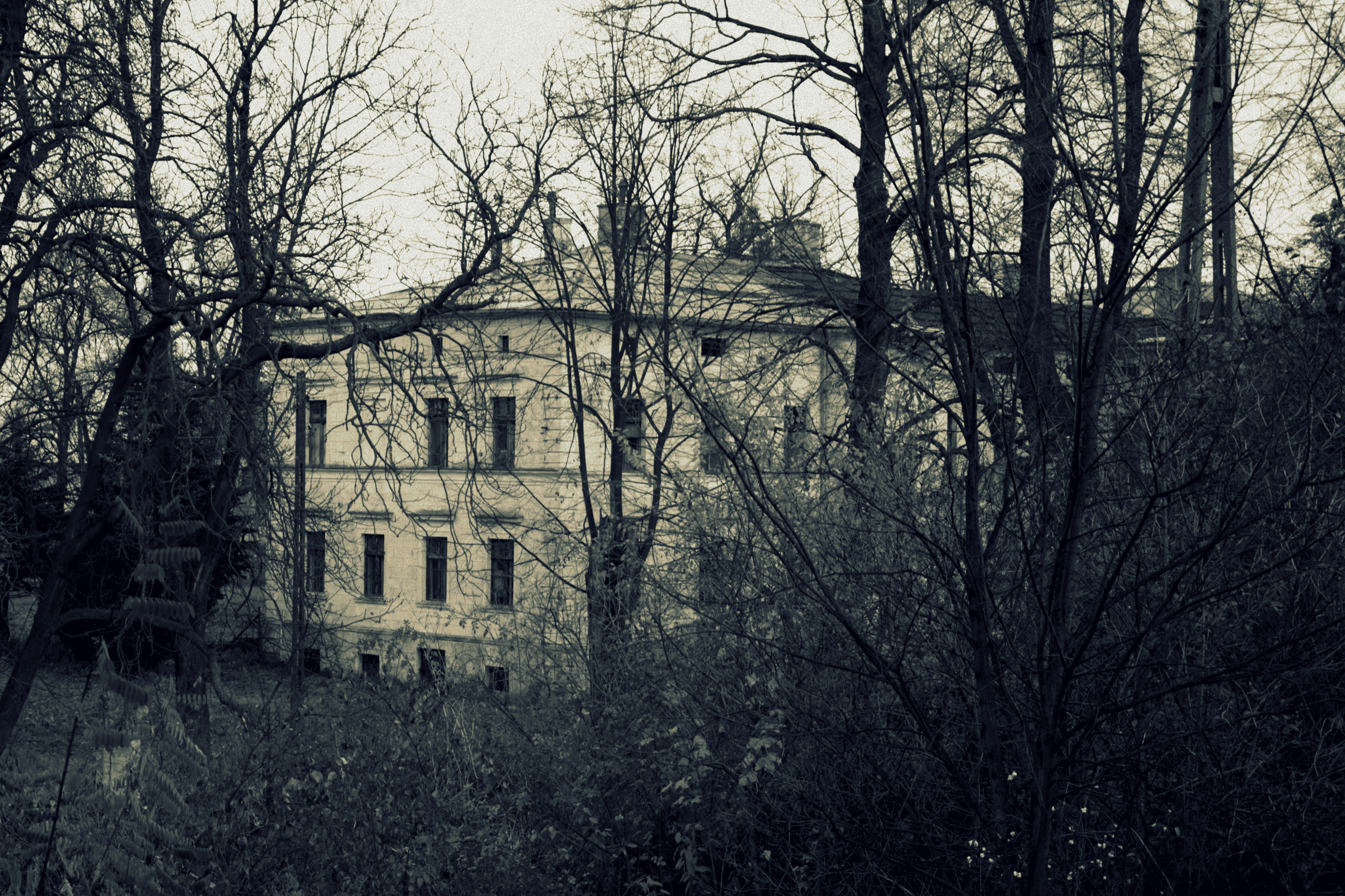
- Palace

- Location within Poland
- Coordinates: 51°05′54″N 16°28′50″E
- Country: Poland
- Voivodeship: Lower Silesian
- County: Środa
- Gmina: Udanin

Karnice [karˈnit͡sɛ] (German: Körnitz) is a village in the administrative district of Gmina Udanin, within Środa County, Lower Silesian Voivodeship, in south-western Poland.
