= Sokolniki, Gmina Udanin =

Sokolniki
- Village
- Location within Poland
- Coordinates: 51°03′03″N 16°32′12″E
- Country: Poland
- Voivodeship: Lower Silesian
- County: Środa
- Gmina: Udanin
- Time zone: UTC+1 (CET)
  - Summer (DST): UTC+2 (CEST)
- Vehicle registration: DSR

Sokolniki [sɔkɔlˈɲikʲi] (German: Zuckelnick) is a village in the administrative district of Gmina Udanin, within Środa County, Lower Silesian Voivodeship, in south-western Poland.

The village's name is of Polish origin and comes from the word sokół, which means "falcon".
