= Pielaszkowice =

- Village
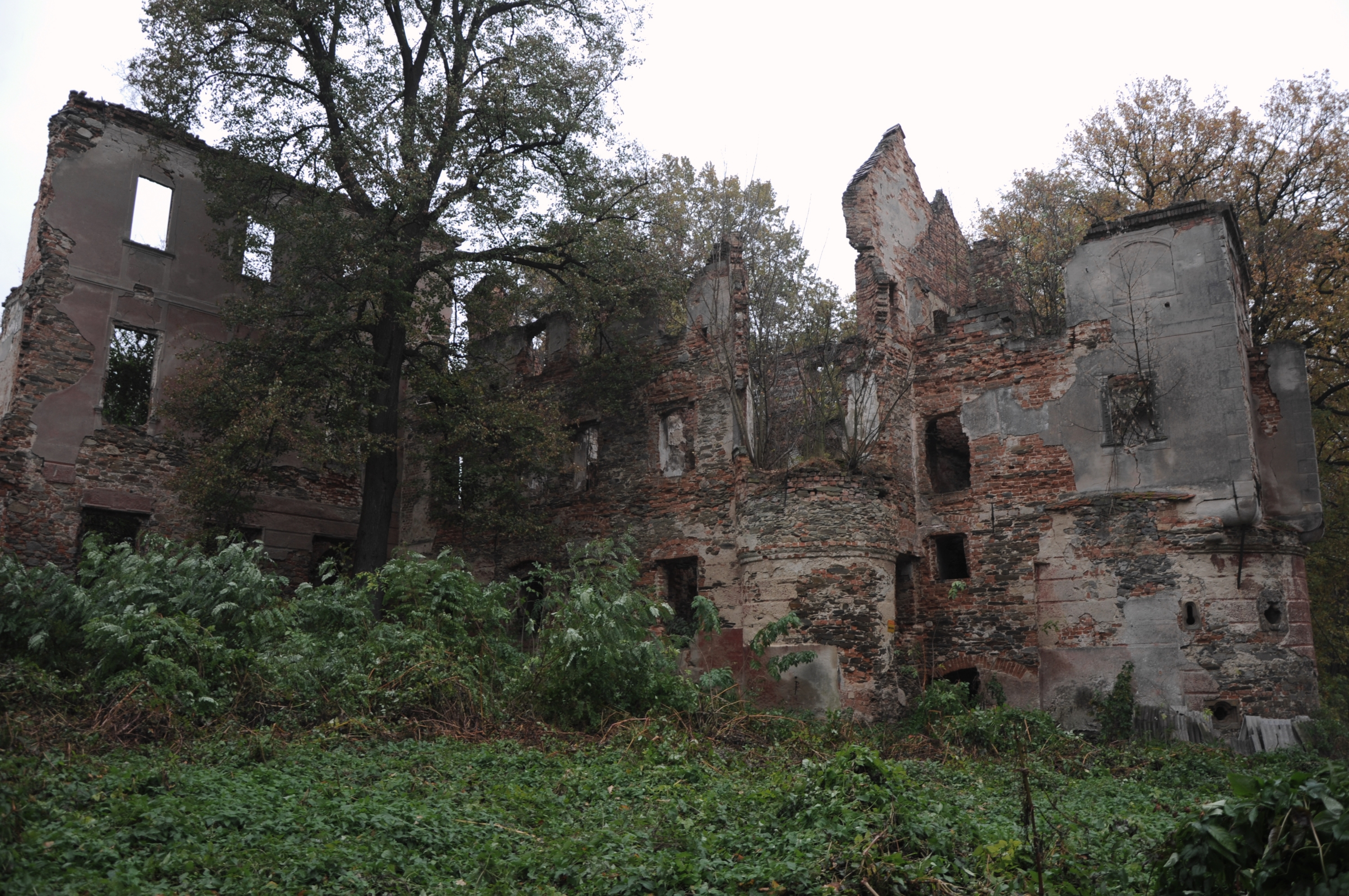

- Location within Poland
- Coordinates: 51°02′39″N 16°30′38″E
- Country: Poland
- Voivodeship: Lower Silesian
- County: Środa
- Gmina: Udanin

Pielaszkowice [pjɛlaʂkɔˈvit͡sɛ] (German: Pläswitz) is a village in the administrative district of Gmina Udanin, within Środa County, Lower Silesian Voivodeship, in south-western Poland.
