= Konary, Gmina Udanin =

Konary
- Village
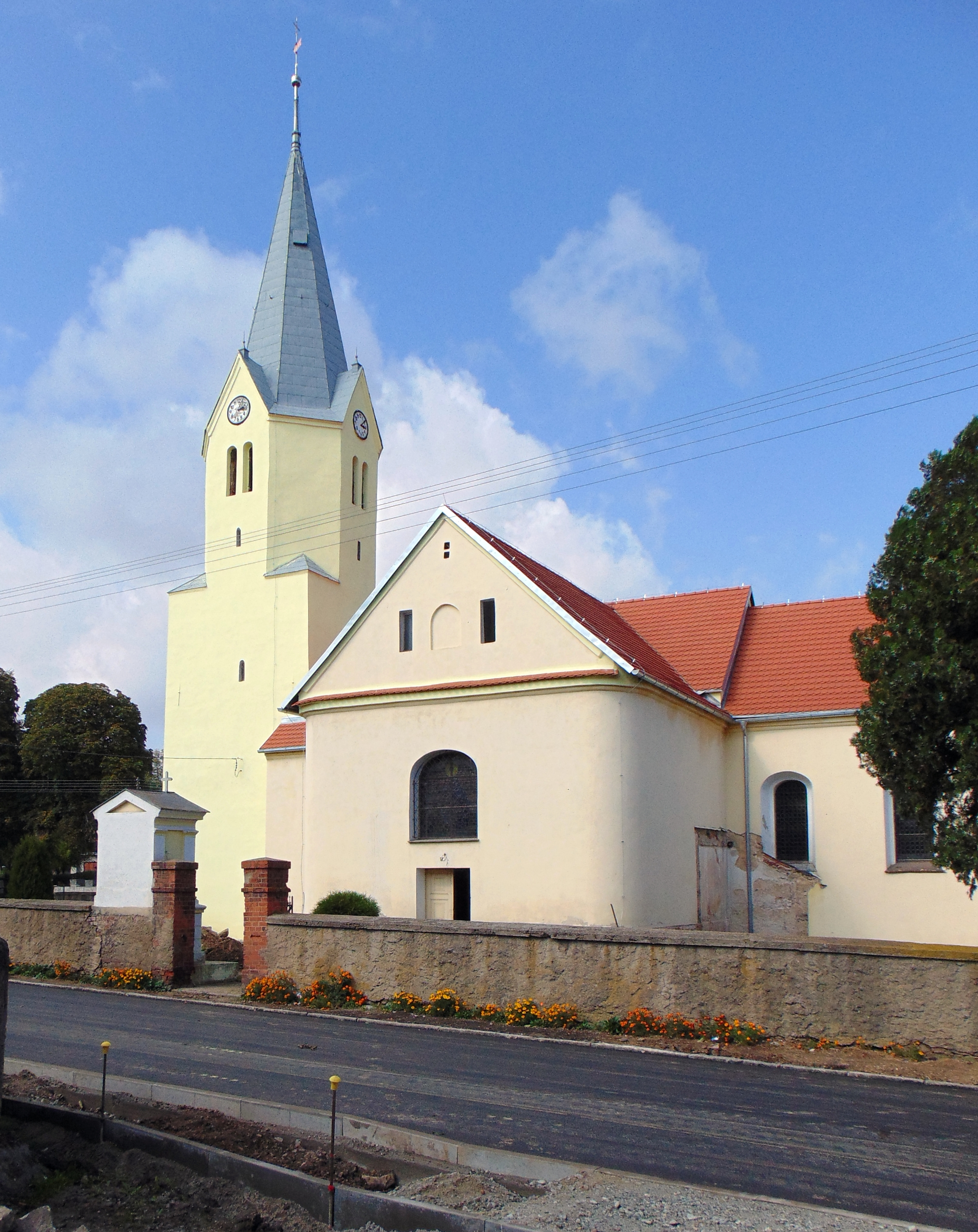
- Catholic church

- Location within Poland
- Coordinates: 51°02′28″N 16°23′30″E
- Country: Poland
- Voivodeship: Lower Silesian
- County: Środa
- Gmina: Udanin
- Population: 410

Konary [kɔˈnarɨ] (German: Kuhnern) is a village in the administrative district of Gmina Udanin, within Środa County, Lower Silesian Voivodeship, in south-western Poland.
