= Piekary, Gmina Udanin =

Piekary
- Village
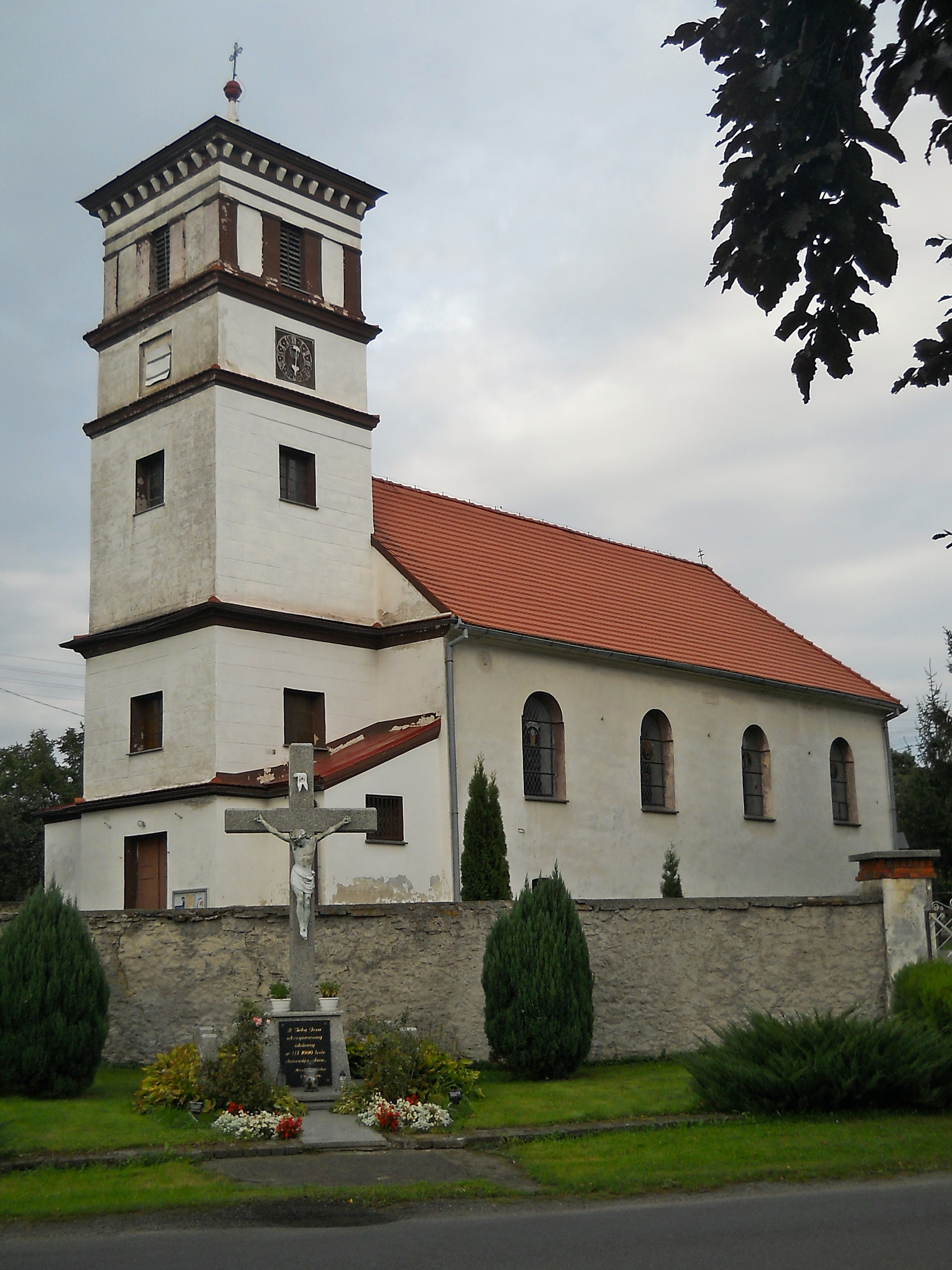
- Catholic church

- Location within Poland
- Coordinates: 51°02′08″N 16°25′35″E
- Country: Poland
- Voivodeship: Lower Silesian
- County: Środa
- Gmina: Udanin

Piekary [pjɛˈkarɨ] (German: Beckern) is a village in the administrative district of Gmina Udanin, within Środa County, Lower Silesian Voivodeship, in south-western Poland.
