= Lasek, Lower Silesian Voivodeship =

Lasek
- Village
- Location within Poland
- Coordinates: 51°00′51″N 16°27′59″E
- Country: Poland
- Voivodeship: Lower Silesian
- County: Środa
- Gmina: Udanin

Lasek [ˈlasɛk] is a village in the administrative district of Gmina Udanin, within Środa County, Lower Silesian Voivodeship, in south-western Poland.
