= Ujazd Górny =

- Village
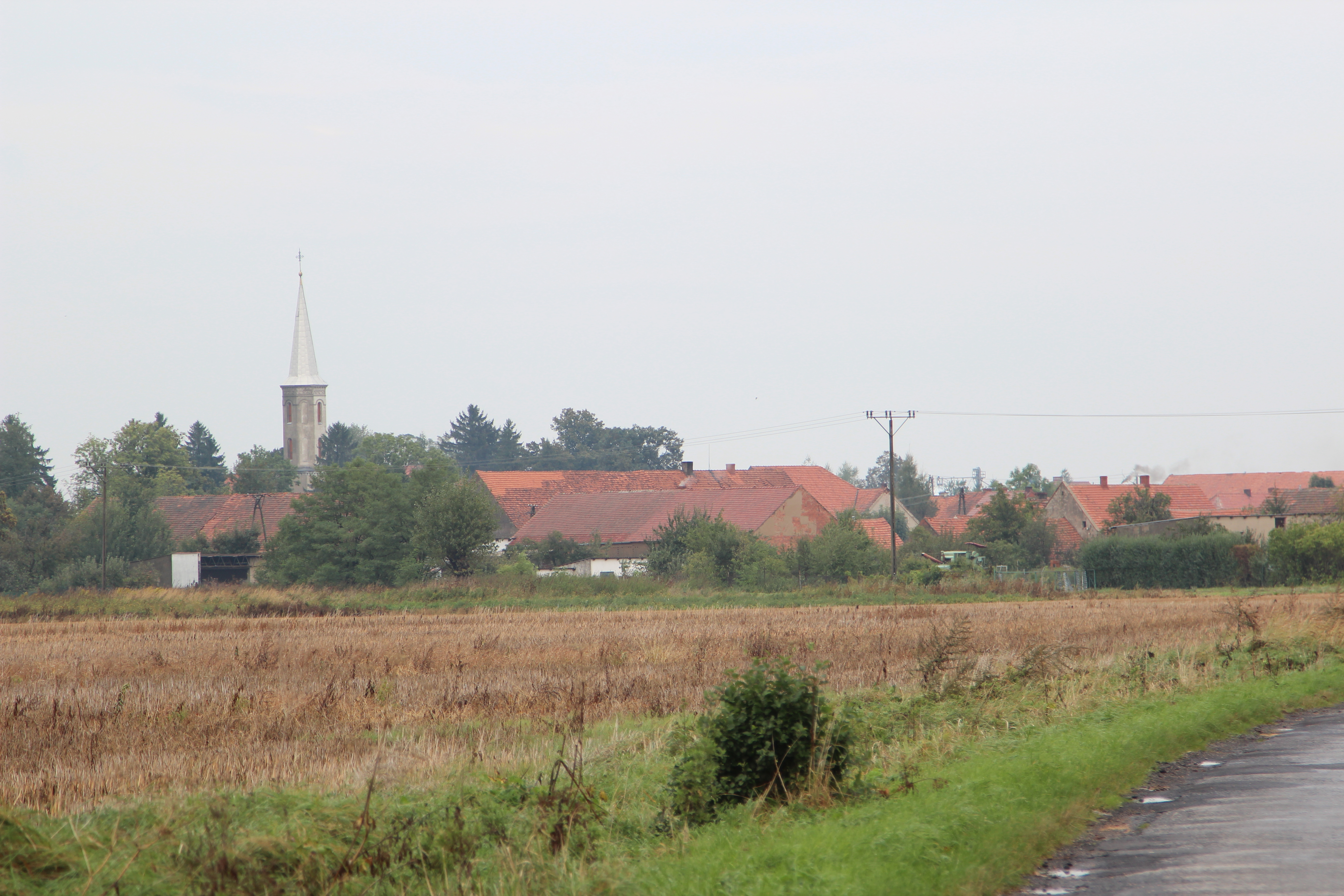

- Location within Poland
- Coordinates: 51°05′02″N 16°30′04″E
- Country: Poland
- Voivodeship: Lower Silesian
- County: Środa
- Gmina: Udanin
- Population: 590

Ujazd Górny [ˈujast ˈɡurnɨ] (German: Ober Mois) is a village in the administrative district of Gmina Udanin, within Środa County, Lower Silesian Voivodeship, in south-western Poland.
