= Drogomiłowice =

- Village
- Location within Poland
- Coordinates: 51°04′16″N 16°25′45″E
- Country: Poland
- Voivodeship: Lower Silesian
- County: Środa
- Gmina: Udanin

Drogomiłowice [drɔɡɔmiwɔˈvit͡sɛ] (German: Dromsdorf-Lohnig) is a village in the administrative district of Gmina Udanin, within Środa County, Lower Silesian Voivodeship, in south-western Poland.
