= Gościsław, Lower Silesian Voivodeship =

Gościsław
- Village
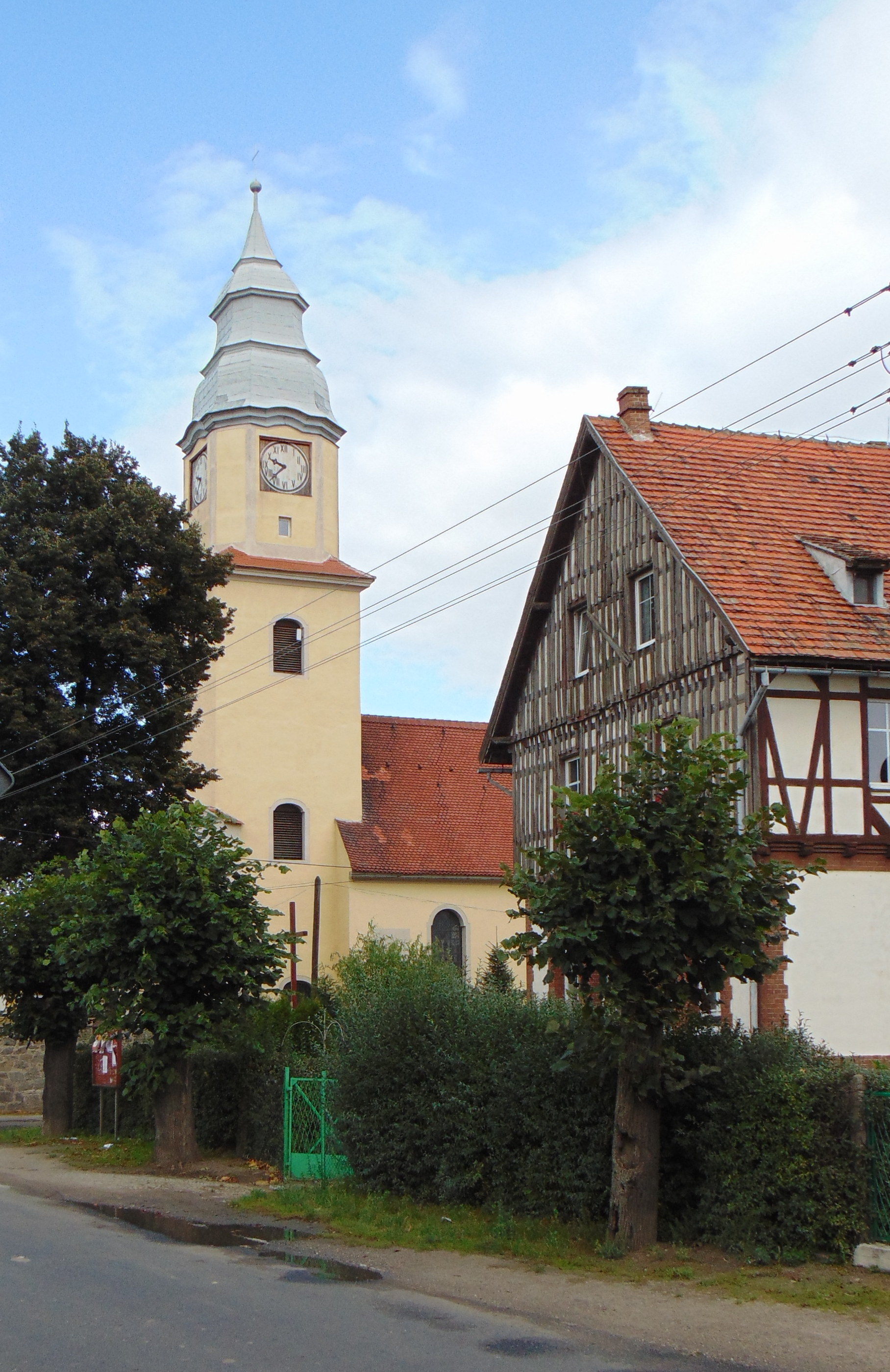
- GOŚCISŁAW -kościół par. p.w. śś.Szymona i Tadeusza Judy

- Location within Poland
- Coordinates: 51°00′56″N 16°30′10″E
- Country: Poland
- Voivodeship: Lower Silesian
- County: Środa
- Gmina: Udanin
- Elevation: 190 m (620 ft)
- Population (approx.): 350

Gościsław (Polish: [ɡɔɕˈt͡ɕiswaf], German: Bertholdsdorf) is a village in the administrative district of Gmina Udanin, within Środa County, Lower Silesian Voivodeship, in south-western Poland.
