= Jarostów =

- Village
- Location within Poland
- Coordinates: 51°04′29″N 16°28′21″E
- Country: Poland
- Voivodeship: Lower Silesian
- County: Środa
- Gmina: Udanin

Jarostów [jaˈrɔstuf] (German: Eisendorf) is a village in the administrative district of Gmina Udanin, within Środa County, Lower Silesian Voivodeship, in south-western Poland.
