= Pichorowice =

- Village
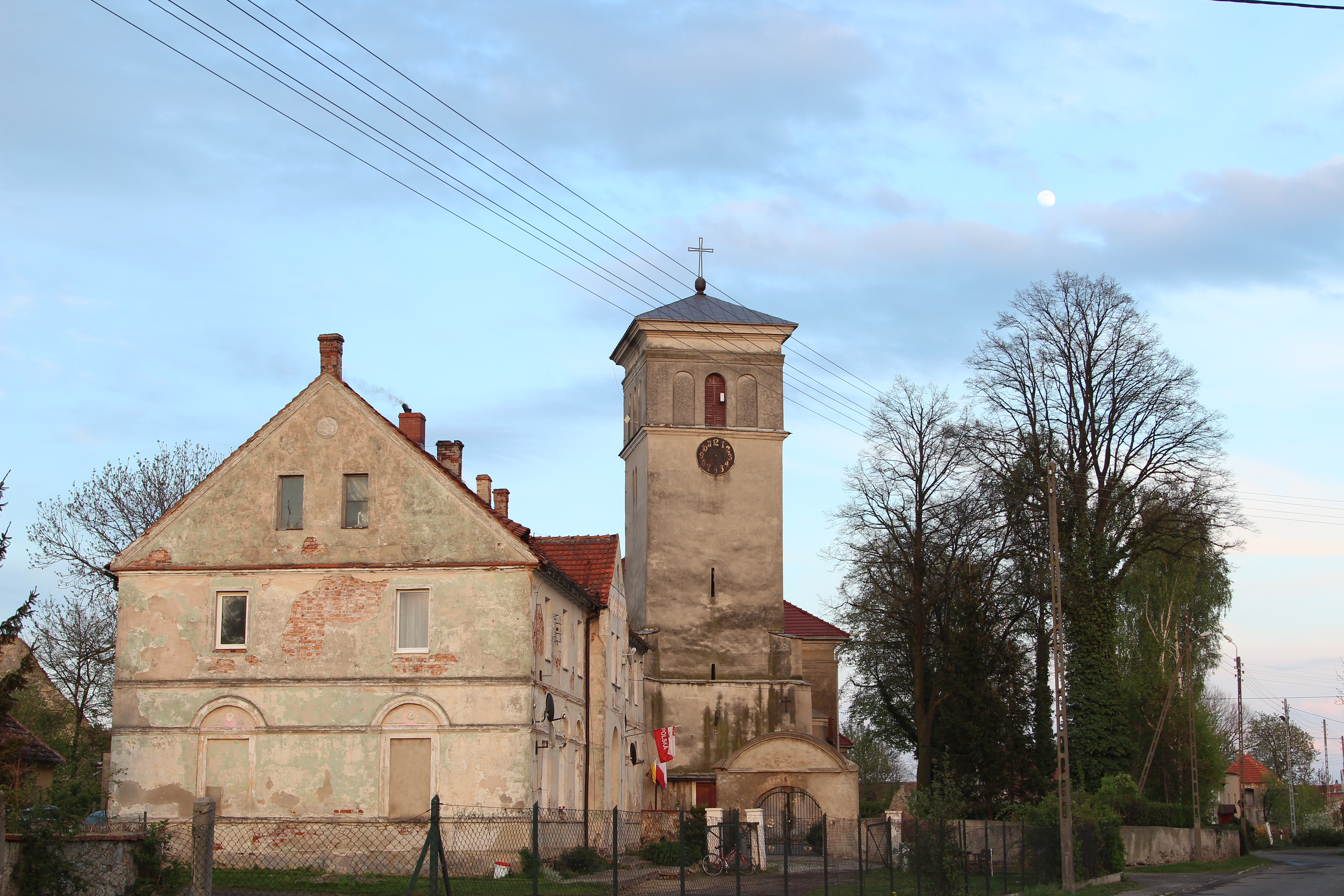
- Catholic church

- Location within Poland
- Coordinates: 51°3′N 16°29′E
- Country: Poland
- Voivodeship: Lower Silesian
- County: Środa
- Gmina: Udanin
- Time zone: UTC+1 (CET)
  - Summer (DST): UTC+2 (CEST)
- Vehicle registration: DSR

Pichorowice [pixɔrɔˈvit͡sɛ] (German: Peicherwitz) is a village in the administrative district of Gmina Udanin, within Środa County, Lower Silesian Voivodeship, in south-western Poland.
