= Dziwigórz =

- Village
- Location within Poland
- Coordinates: 51°01′24″N 16°26′18″E
- Country: Poland
- Voivodeship: Lower Silesian
- County: Środa
- Gmina: Udanin

Dziwigórz [d͡ʑiˈviɡuʂ] (German: Diesdorf) is a village in the administrative district of Gmina Udanin, within Środa County, Lower Silesian Voivodeship, in south-western Poland.
