= Różana, Gmina Udanin =

Różana
- Village
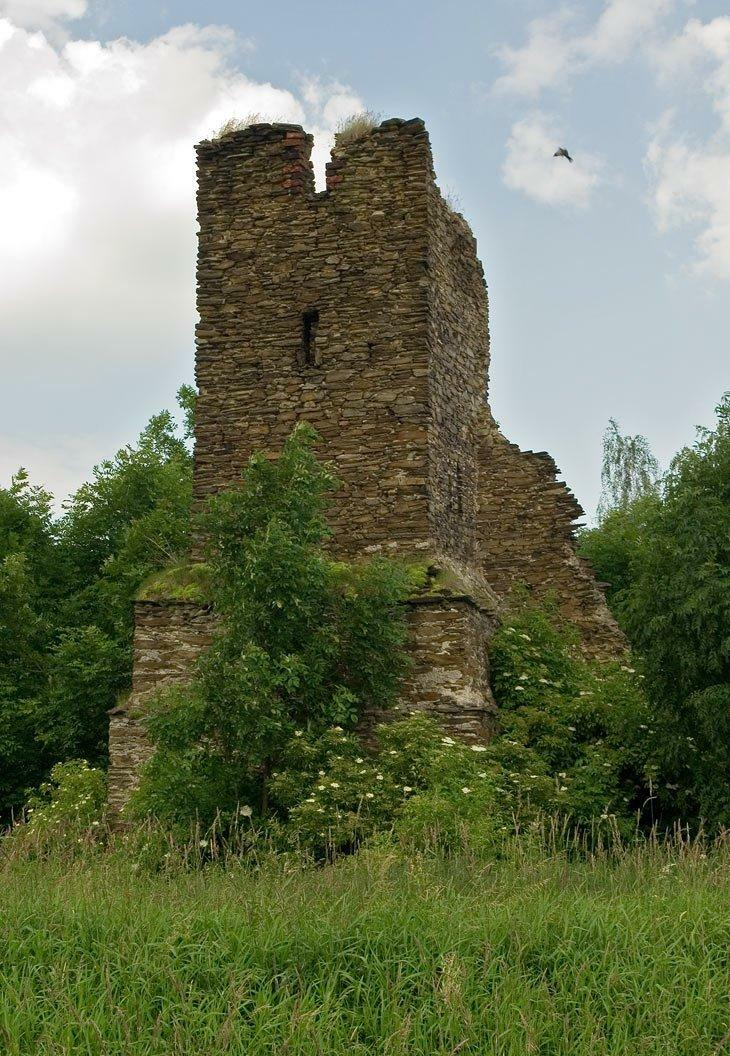
- Ruined church in Różana, Środa Śląska County

- Location within Poland
- Coordinates: 51°03′34″N 16°25′42″E
- Country: Poland
- Voivodeship: Lower Silesian
- County: Środa
- Gmina: Udanin

Różana [ruˈʐana] (German: Lederose) is a village in the administrative district of Gmina Udanin, within Środa County, Lower Silesian Voivodeship, in south-western Poland.

== Notable people ==
- Hans Erasmus Aßmann, lord of Lederose from 1669.
