= Damianowo =

- Village
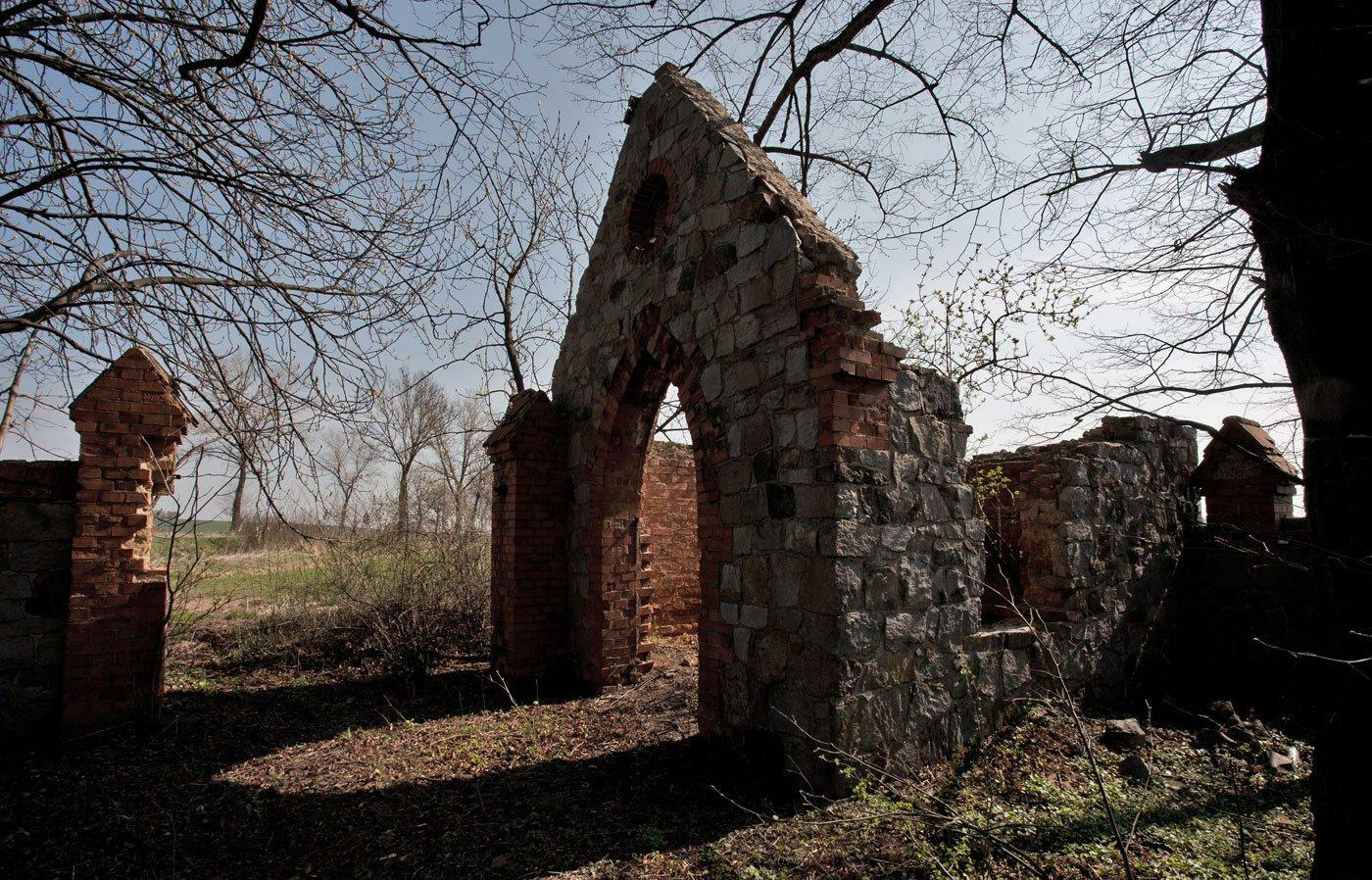
- Księżyce, Cmentarz - fotopolska

- Location within Poland
- Coordinates: 51°03′09″N 16°21′59″E
- Country: Poland
- Voivodeship: Lower Silesian
- County: Środa
- Gmina: Udanin

Damianowo [damjaˈnɔvɔ] (German: Damsdorf) is a village in the administrative district of Gmina Udanin, within Środa County, Lower Silesian Voivodeship, in south-western Poland. The village was once an estate of the Richthofen family.
