= Bahnwärter Thiel (novella) =

German novella

- Author: Gerhart Hauptmann
- Translator: Stanley Radcliffe (1989)
- Language: German
- Genre: Naturalism
- Publisher: Die Gesellschaft
- Publication date: 1888
- Publication place: Germany
- English publication date: 1905, 1989
- Media type: Print

Bahnwärter Thiel, translated as Lineman Thiel and Trackwalker Thiel, is a German Naturalist novella by writer Gerhart Hauptmann first published in 1888.

== Plot ==
Thiel, a man of "Herculean" stature and a diligent churchgoer, is working as a lineman near Erkner, Brandenburg, Germany. He marries a slender and sickly-looking woman, Minna, who dies after giving birth to their son Tobias. One year later, Thiel marries again, this time to former maid Lene, a big and strong, but also domineering and quarrelsome woman, and has a second child with her. Thiel notices signs of abuse on Tobias, who is overtly disliked by his stepmother, but he pretends not to see them despite his love to his son. He has repeated visions of his dead first wife; in one of these, she stumbles along the rail tracks, carrying something wrapped in bloodied cloths with her.

One day, Lene accompanies Thiel with Tobias and their second child to his workplace, as Thiel has been given a small piece of land nearby which Lene intends to use as a potato field. Due to Lene's inattentiveness, Tobias is run over by a train and later dies. Thiel succumbs to madness and promises Minna to avenge Tobias' death. When a group of workers carrying the dead Tobias arrives at his home, they discover the bodies of Lene and her child, both brutally murdered. Thiel is arrested at the site of the accident and, due to his state of frenzy, is interned in a mental institution, all the while holding his son's bobble hat.

== Background ==
Bahnwärter Thiel was written by Hauptmann in 1887 while he was living in Erkner and still relatively unknown. In his novella, Hauptmann made use of the "Sekundenstil" ("seconds-style"), a literary device typical of the Naturalist movement, in which the durations of the description of an event and the described event are identical. The subtitle Novellistische Studie ("novellistic study") accentuated the distance between Naturalism and bourgeois literature, between the fragmentary and aesthetic perfection, and referred to the direct observation of the object in Impressionist art.

Bahnwärter Thiel was published in the literary magazine Die Gesellschaft ("Society") in 1888. At the time, Die Gesellschaft was one of the leading German magazines of the Naturalist movement. An English translation under the title Lineman Thiel was provided by Stanley Radcliffe in 1989. An earlier translation titled Trackwalker Thiel had appeared in the magazine Transatlantic Tales in 1905.

== Bibliography ==
- Hauptmann, Gerhart (1989). Lineman Thiel and Other Tales. Translated by Radcliffe, Stanley. London: Angel Books.
