= Łagiewniki Średzkie =

- Village
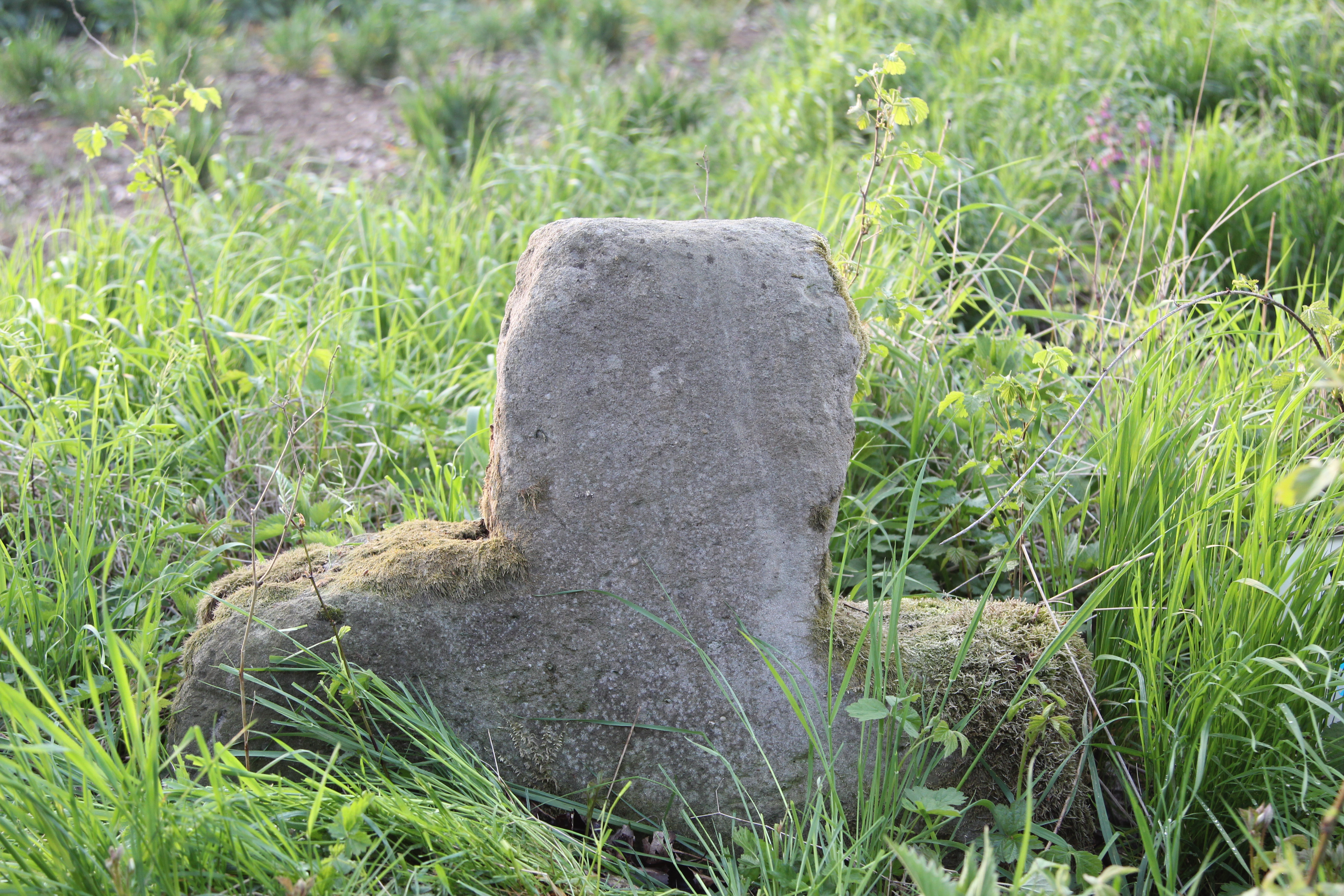
- Stone cross

- Location within Poland
- Coordinates: 51°04′00″N 16°27′09″E
- Country: Poland
- Voivodeship: Lower Silesian
- County: Środa
- Gmina: Udanin

Łagiewniki Średzkie [waɡʲɛvˈniki ˈɕrɛt͡skʲɛ] is a village in the administrative district of Gmina Udanin, within Środa County, Lower Silesian Voivodeship, in south-western Poland.
