= Gmina Udanin =

Gmina Udanin Udanin Commune
- Gmina
- Coat of arms
- Interactive map of Gmina Udanin
- Coordinates (Udanin): 51°2′N 16°27′E
- Country: Poland
- Voivodeship: Lower Silesian
- County: Środa
- Seat: Udanin
- Sołectwos: Damianowo, Drogomiłowice, Dziwigórz, Gościsław, Jarosław, Jarostów, Karnice, Konary, Łagiewniki Średzkie, Lasek, Lusina, Pichorowice, Piekary, Pielaszkowice, Różana, Sokolniki, Udanin, Ujazd Dolny, Ujazd Górny

Area
  - Total: 110.71 km^{2} (42.75 sq mi)

Population (2019-06-30)
  - Total: 5,082
  - Density: 45.90/km^{2} (118.9/sq mi)
- Website: http://www.udanin.pl

Gmina Udanin is a rural gmina (administrative district) in Środa County, Lower Silesian Voivodeship, in south-western Poland. Its seat is the village of Udanin, which lies approximately 16 kilometres (10 mi) south-west of Środa Śląska, and 43 kilometres (27 mi) west of the regional capital Wrocław.

The gmina covers an area of 110.71 square kilometres (42.7 sq mi), and as of 2019 its total population was 5,082. It is part of the larger Wrocław metropolitan area.

== Neighbouring gminas ==
Gmina Udanin is bordered by the gminas of Kostomłoty, Mściwojów, Środa Śląska, Strzegom, Wądroże Wielkie and Żarów.

== Villages ==
The gmina contains the villages of Damianowo, Dębki, Dębnica, Drogomiłowice, Dziwigórz, Gościsław, Jańczów, Jarosław, Jarostów, Karnice, Konary, Księżyce, Łagiewniki Średzkie, Lasek, Lusina, Pichorowice, Piekary, Pielaszkowice, Różana, Sokolniki, Udanin, Ujazd Dolny and Ujazd Górny.

== Twin towns – sister cities ==
Gmina Udanin is twinned with:

- Oderwitz, Germany
