= Brzezinka Średzka =

- Village
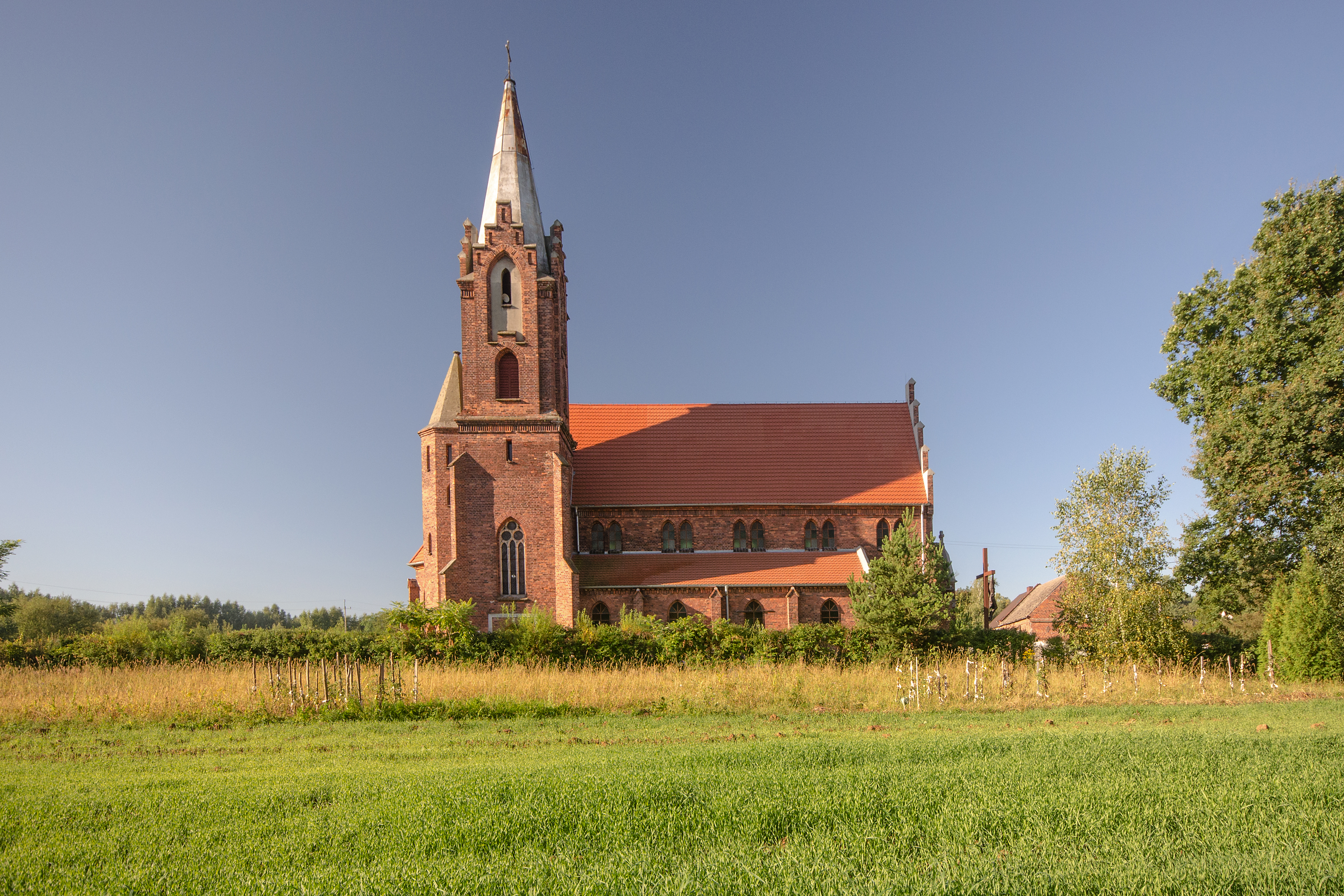
- Our Lady Queen of Poland church in Brzezinka Średzka

- Location within Poland
- Coordinates: 51°13′N 16°50′E
- Country: Poland
- Voivodeship: Lower Silesian
- County: Środa
- Gmina: Miękinia
- Time zone: UTC+1 (CET)
  - Summer (DST): UTC+2 (CEST)
- Vehicle registration: DSR

Brzezinka Średzka (Polish: [bʐɛˈʑiŋka ˈɕrɛt͡ska]; German: Klein Bresa) is a village in the administrative district of Gmina Miękinia, within Środa County, Lower Silesian Voivodeship, in south-western Poland.

The village is connected by rail to Wrocław through the PKP. The village also contains the 19th-century Church of Our Lady Queen of Poland. Alongside this is the remnants of former aristocratic land holdings in the village, such as a manor and the tombs located in the forest near the Church. Also, in the center of the village one can find the remnants of the PGR.

== History ==
The area became part of the emerging Polish state in the 10th century. Centuries later it passed to Bohemia (Czechia), Prussia and Germany. It became again part of Poland following Germany's defeat in World War II in 1945.
