= Gosławice, Lower Silesian Voivodeship =

Gosławice
- Village
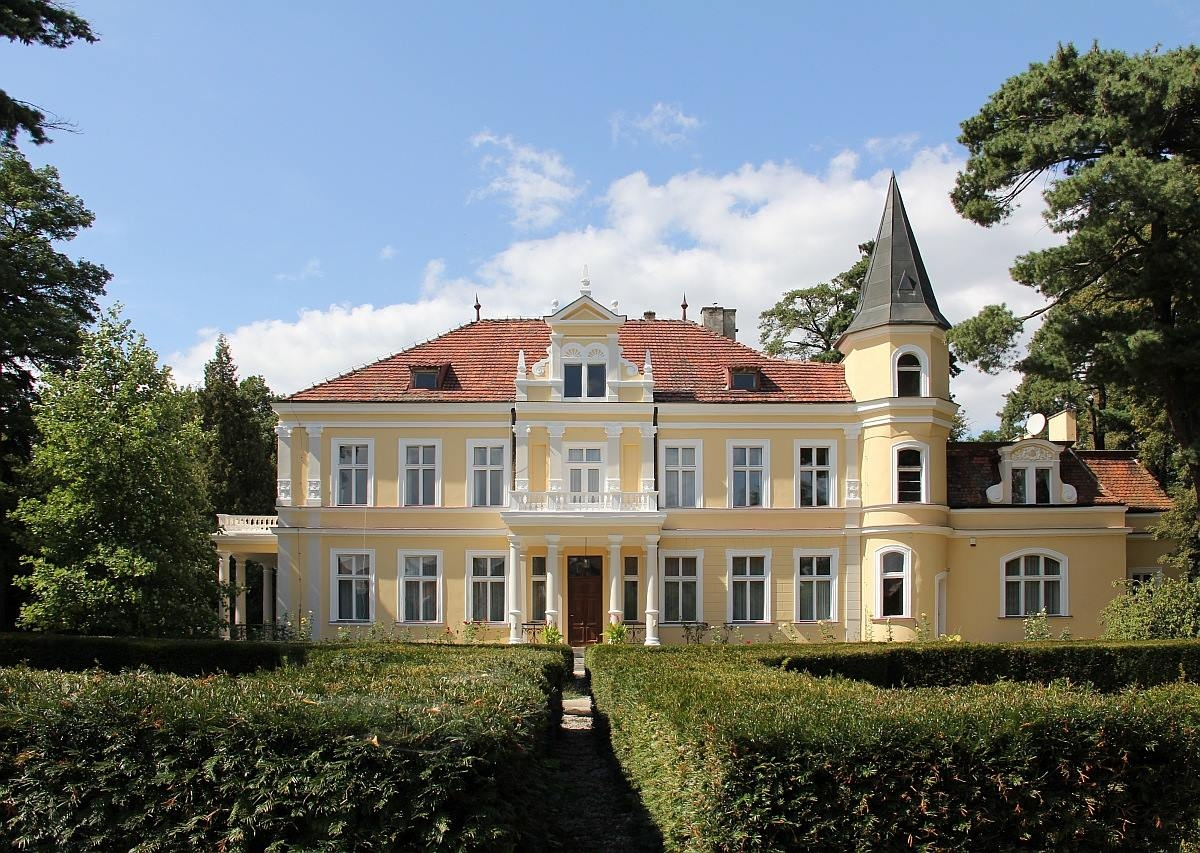
- Palace in Gosławice

- Location within Poland
- Coordinates: 51°13′32″N 16°49′44″E
- Country: Poland
- Voivodeship: Lower Silesian
- County: Środa
- Gmina: Miękinia
- Time zone: UTC+1 (CET)
  - Summer (DST): UTC+2 (CEST)
- Vehicle registration: DSR

Gosławice [ɡɔswaˈvit͡sɛ] (German: Gniefgau) is a village in the administrative district of Gmina Miękinia, within Środa County, Lower Silesian Voivodeship, in south-western Poland.
