= Saint-Aubin-lès-Elbeuf =

Commune in Normandy, France

- Commune
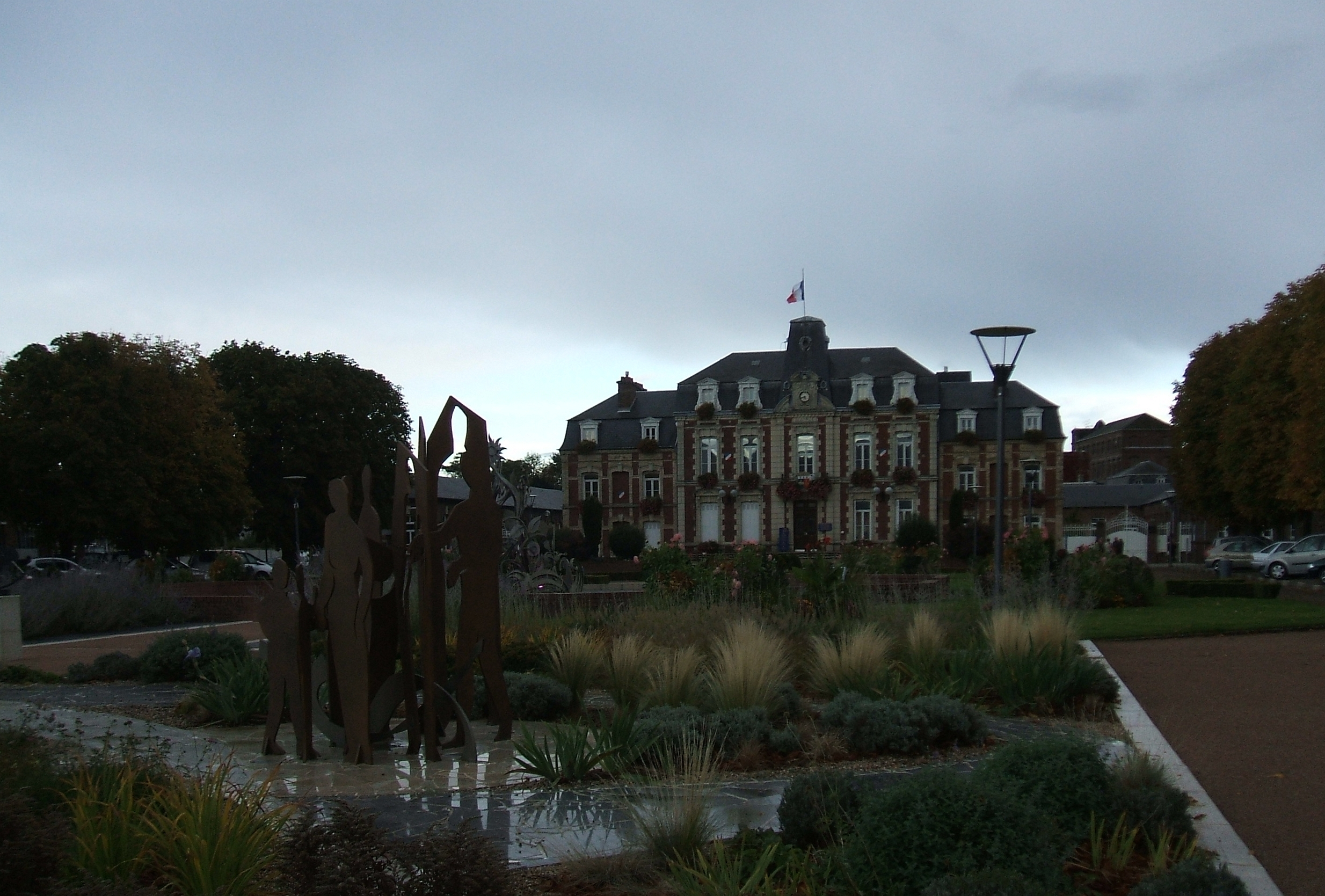
- The town hall in Saint-Aubin-lès-Elbeuf

- Coat of arms
- Location of Saint-Aubin-lès-Elbeuf
- Location within France Location within Normandy
- Coordinates: 49°17′57″N 1°00′46″E
- Country: France
- Region: Normandy
- Department: Seine-Maritime
- Arrondissement: Rouen
- Canton: Caudebec-lès-Elbeuf
- Intercommunality: Métropole Rouen Normandie

Government
  - Mayor (2026–32): Gérard Soucasse
- Area^{1}: 5.79 km^{2} (2.24 sq mi)
- Elevation: 13 m (43 ft)
- Highest elevation: 49 m (161 ft)
- Lowest elevation: 2 m (6.6 ft)
- Population (2023): 8,443
  - Density: 1,460/km^{2} (3,780/sq mi)
- Time zone: UTC+01:00 (CET)
  - Summer (DST): UTC+02:00 (CEST)
- INSEE/Postal code: 76561 /76410
- ^{1} French Land Register data, which excludes lakes, ponds, glaciers > 1 km^{2} (0.386 sq mi or 247 acres) and river estuaries.

Saint-Aubin-lès-Elbeuf (French pronunciation: [sɛ̃.t‿obɛ̃ lɛ.z‿ɛlbœf], literally Saint-Aubin near Elbeuf) is a commune in the Seine-Maritime department in the Normandy region in northern France.

== Geography ==
A light industrial town situated in a meander of the river Seine, some 12 miles (19 km) south of Rouen near the junction of the D7, D92 and the D144 roads. SNCF operates a TER railway service here.

== Heraldry ==
Arms of Saint-Aubin-lès-Elbeuf

== Population ==
Historical population
Year	Pop.	±% p.a.
1968	8,305	—
1975	8,869	+0.94%
1982	9,424	+0.87%
1990	8,671	−1.04%
1999	8,296	−0.49%
2007	8,097	−0.30%
2012	8,101	+0.01%
2017	8,309	+0.51%
2023	8,443	+0.27%
Source: INSEE

== Places of interest ==
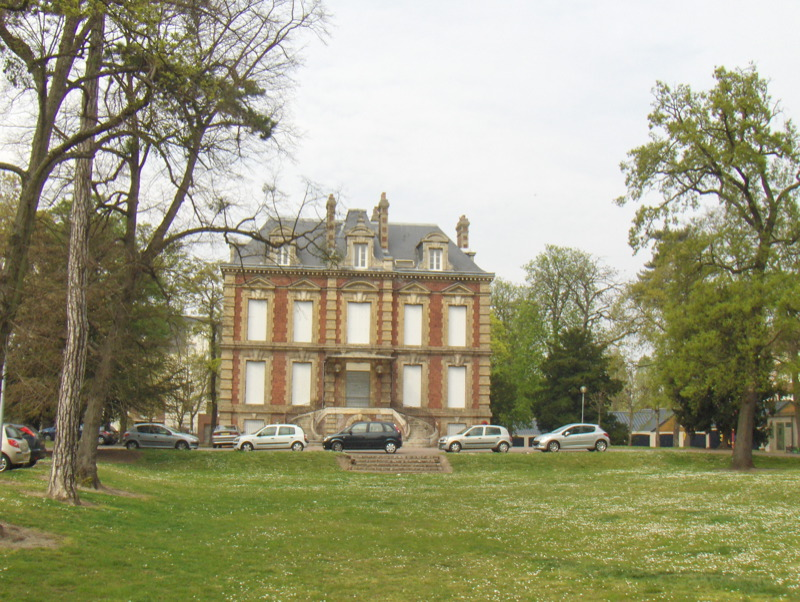
bibliothèque municipale et en logements sociaux Municipal library

- The church of St. Aubin, dating from the fourteenth century.
- The seventeenth-century château of Mathonville.
- The ancient priory of Saint-Gilles.
- Several old houses.

== Twin towns ==
Saint-Aubin-lès-Elbeuf is twinned with

Karpniki, Poland
Pattensen, Germany
Wilkszyn, Poland

== See also ==
- Communes of the Seine-Maritime department
