= Kadłub =

Kadłub may refer to the following places in Poland:

- Kadłub, Lower Silesian Voivodeship (south-west Poland)
- Kadłub, Podlaskie Voivodeship (north-east Poland)
- Kadłub, Łódź Voivodeship (central Poland)
- Kadłub, Opole Voivodeship (south-west Poland)
