= Białków, Gmina Miękinia =

Białków
- Village
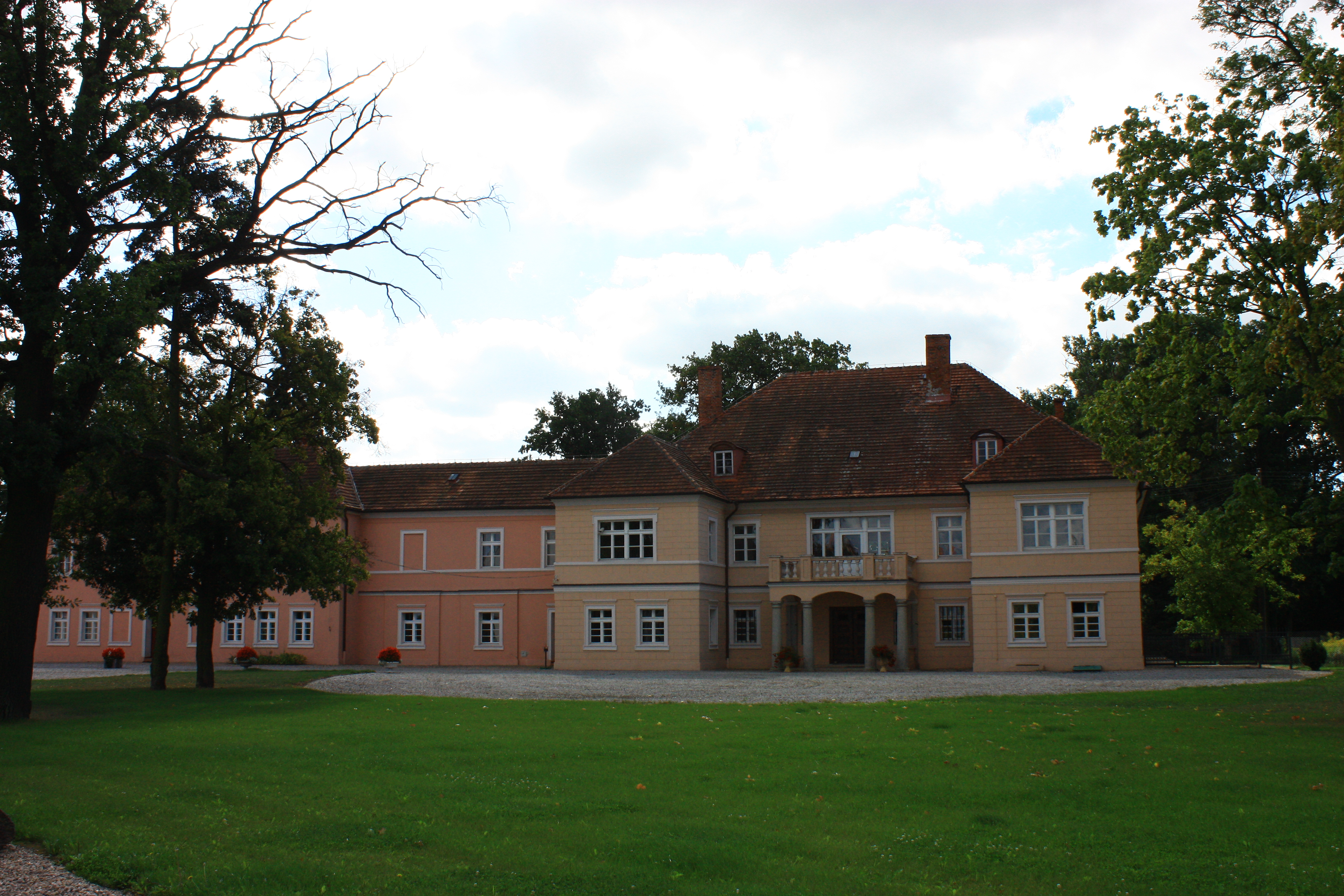
- Mansion in Białków

- Location within Poland
- Coordinates: 51°12′57″N 16°45′55″E
- Country: Poland
- Voivodeship: Lower Silesian
- County: Środa
- Gmina: Miękinia
- Population: 300
- Time zone: UTC+1 (CET)
  - Summer (DST): UTC+2 (CEST)
- Vehicle registration: DSR

Białków [ˈbjau̯kuf] (German: Belkau) is a village in the administrative district of Gmina Miękinia, within Środa County, Lower Silesian Voivodeship, in south-western Poland.
