= Gloska =

Gloska may refer to:

- Głoska, Lower Silesian Voivodeship, a village in Poland
- Gloška planina, a mountain in Serbia

== See also ==
- Zecharia Glosca (died 1960), Yemenite Jew and Israeli politician
