= Żurawiniec =

Żurawiniec may refer to the following places in Poland:

- Żurawiniec, Lower Silesian Voivodeship (south-west Poland)
- Żurawiniec, Lublin Voivodeship (east Poland)
- Żurawiniec, Greater Poland Voivodeship (west-central Poland)
