= Wróblowice, Lower Silesian Voivodeship =

Wróblowice
- Village
- Location within Poland
- Coordinates: 51°09′19″N 16°47′04″E
- Country: Poland
- Voivodeship: Lower Silesian
- County: Środa
- Gmina: Miękinia
- Time zone: UTC+1 (CET)
  - Summer (DST): UTC+2 (CEST)
- Vehicle registration: DSR

Wróblowice [vrublɔˈvit͡sɛ] (German: Frobelwitz) is a village in the administrative district of Gmina Miękinia, within Środa County, Lower Silesian Voivodeship, in south-western Poland.
