= Krępice, Lower Silesian Voivodeship =

Krępice
- Village
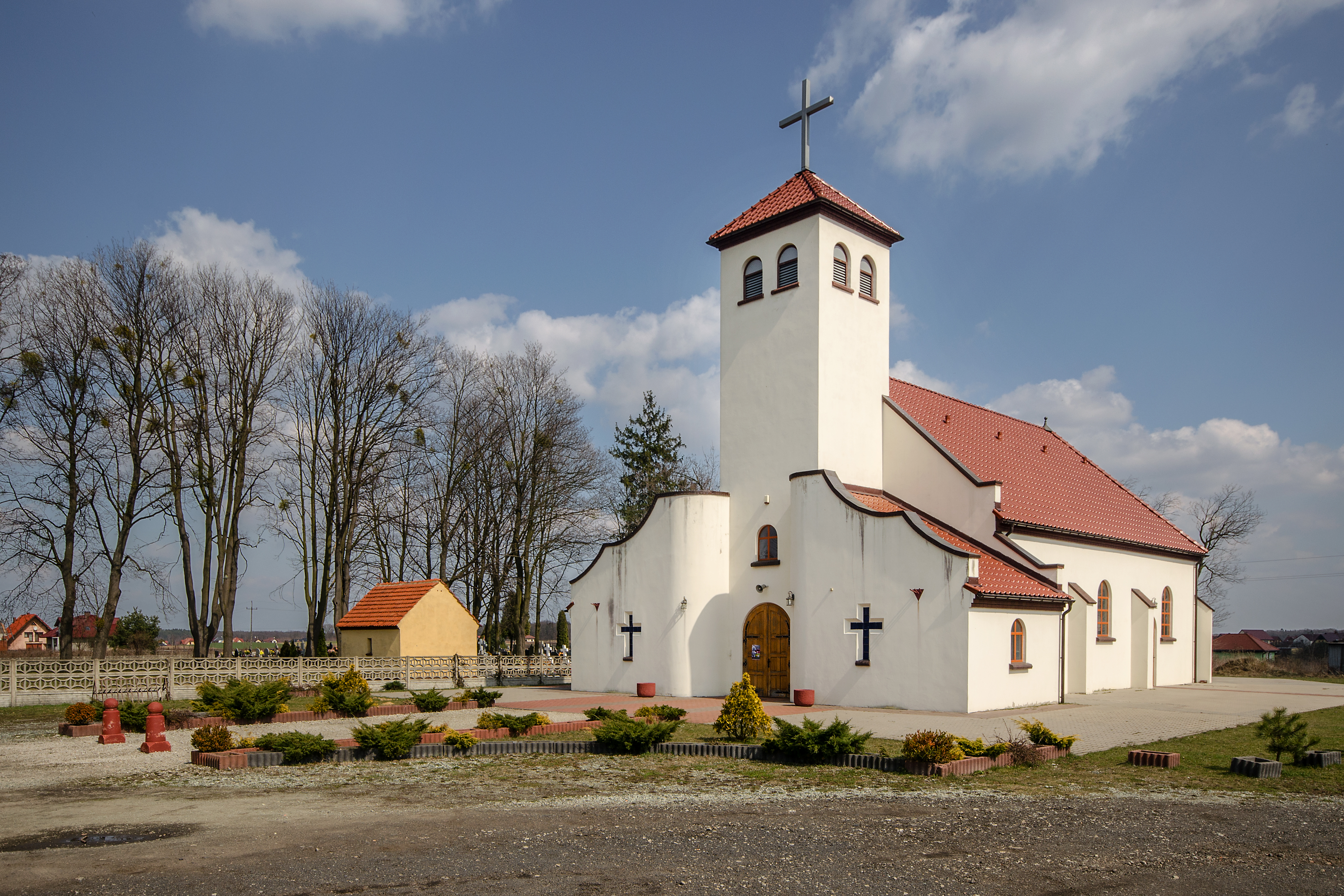
- Chapel in Krępice

- Location within Poland
- Coordinates: 51°09′48″N 16°48′38″E
- Country: Poland
- Voivodeship: Lower Silesian
- County: Środa
- Gmina: Miękinia
- Time zone: UTC+1 (CET)
  - Summer (DST): UTC+2 (CEST)
- Vehicle registration: DSR

Krępice [krɛmˈpit͡sɛ] (German: Krampitz) is a village in the administrative district of Gmina Miękinia, within Środa County, Lower Silesian Voivodeship, in south-western Poland.
