= Księginice =

Księginice may refer to the following places in Lower Silesian Voivodeship, southwestern Poland:

- Księginice, Legnica County
- Księginice, Lubin County
- Księginice, Gmina Miękinia in Środa County
- Księginice, Trzebnica County
- Księginice, Wrocław County
