= Pattensen =

- Town
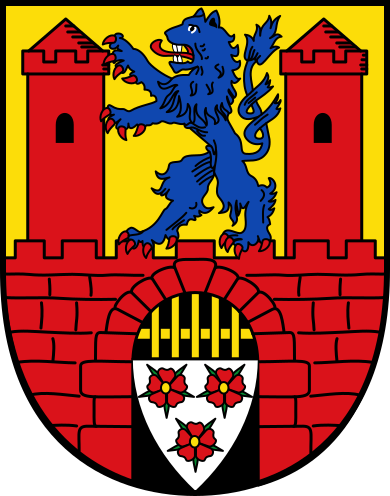
- Coat of arms

- Location of Pattensen within Hanover district
- Interactive map of Pattensen
- Location within Germany Location within Lower Saxony
- Coordinates: 52°16′N 9°46′E
- Country: Germany
- State: Lower Saxony
- District: Hanover

Government
  - Mayor (2021–26): Ramona Schumann (SPD)

Area
  - Total: 67.13 km^{2} (25.92 sq mi)
- Elevation: 63 m (207 ft)

Population (2025-12-31)
  - Total: 14,699
  - Density: 219.0/km^{2} (567.1/sq mi)
- Time zone: UTC+01:00 (CET)
  - Summer (DST): UTC+02:00 (CEST)
- Postal codes: 30982
- Dialling codes: 05066, 05069, 05101, 05102
- Vehicle registration: H
- Website: www.pattensen.de

Pattensen (German: [ˈpatn̩zn̩]) is a town in the district of Hanover, in Lower Saxony, Germany. It is situated approximately 12 km (7 mi) south of Hanover.

== Geography ==
Pattensen is located in the historic landscape Calenberg Land between the Leine and the Deister hills. The area is dominated by agriculture, many residents commute to work in Hanover or Hildesheim.

The town of Pattensen has the following 8 boroughs (or Stadtteile), some of which were previously independent villages: Hüpede, Jeinsen, Koldingen, Oerie, Pattensen-Mitte, Reden, Schulenburg and Vardegötzen as well as the two hamlets Thiedenwiese und Lauenstadt.

== History ==
Pattensen was first mentioned in a document in 986, nevertheless, the first people probably settled in the old town between the 6th and 8th century.

In the 13th century, Graf Ludolf II. von Hallermund built the Pattensen Castle to monitor the important trade routes that crossed the city in north–south and west–east directions. From the middle of the 13th century, the city belonged to the Principality of Lüneburg. The city was of strategic military importance, so that it was heavily fortified and enlarged as a result. In the area of the present town of Pattensen, also the Calenberg Castle and the Koldingen Castle were built in these times. In 1433, Pattensen became part of the Principality of Calenberg. During the Reformation the city was the seat of an archdeacon under the leadership of the superintendent Antonius Corvinus. At that time the city was often the venue for church synods and state parliament meetings.

During the centuries, Pattensen was repeatedly destroyed and plundered as a result of armed conflicts like the War of the Lüneburg Succession (end of 14th century), the Hildesheim Diocesan Feud (1519-1523) or the Thirty Years' War (1618-1648). The city was also destroyed multiple times in several devastating fires, the largest ones in 1655 and 1733. From 1806 to 1813 the city was under French rule and belonged to the Kingdom of Westphalia. In 1866, the Prussian army occupied the region.

In 1974 the surrounding villages were incorporated and today's town of Pattensen was founded.

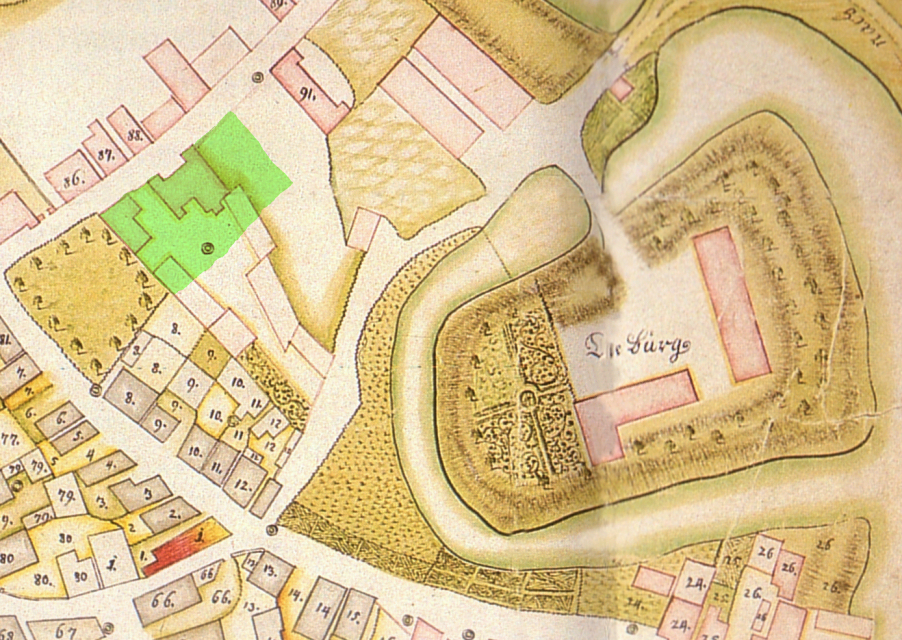
Pattensen castle (on a city map before 1733)

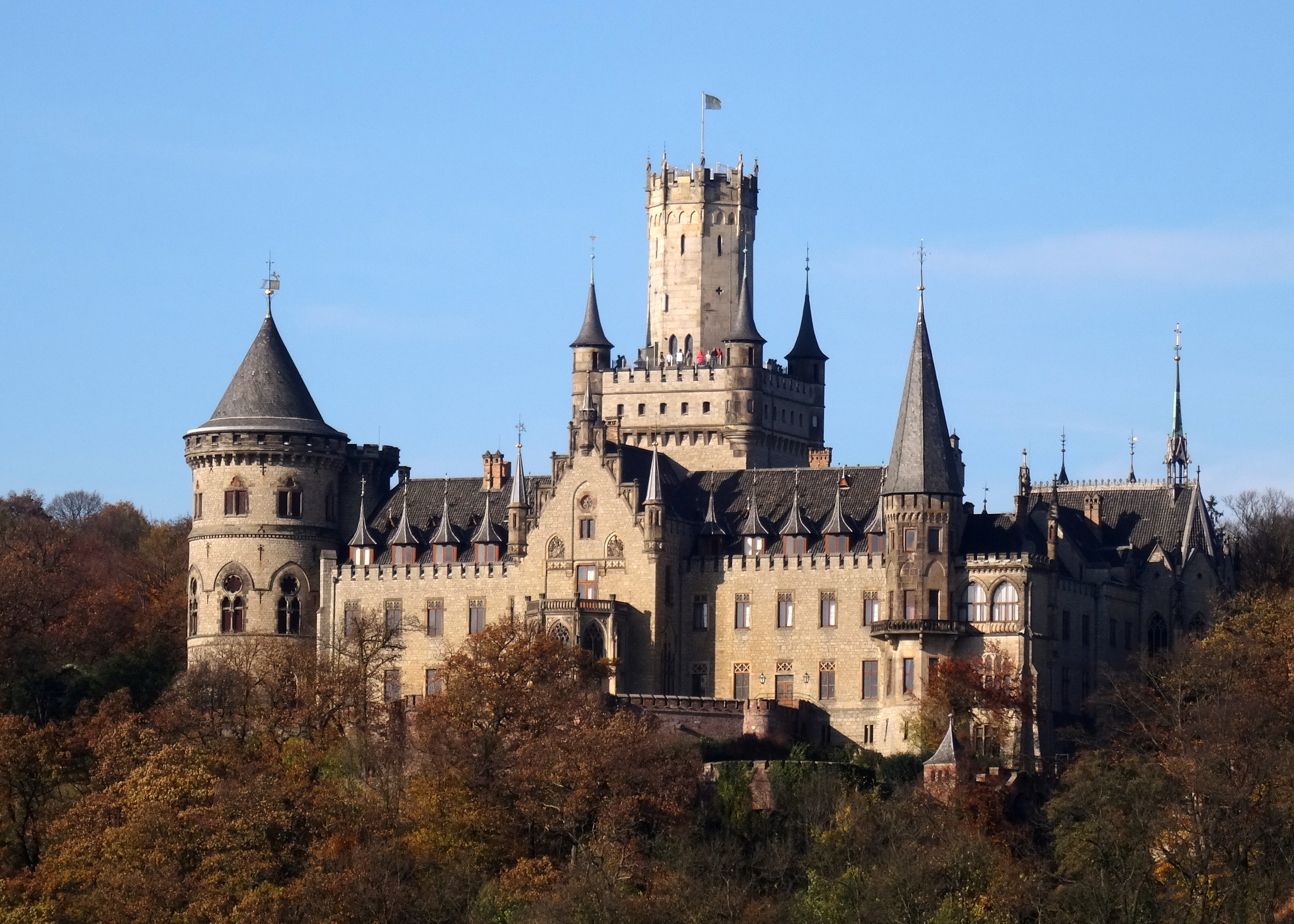
Marienburg Castle (built 1858–1867)

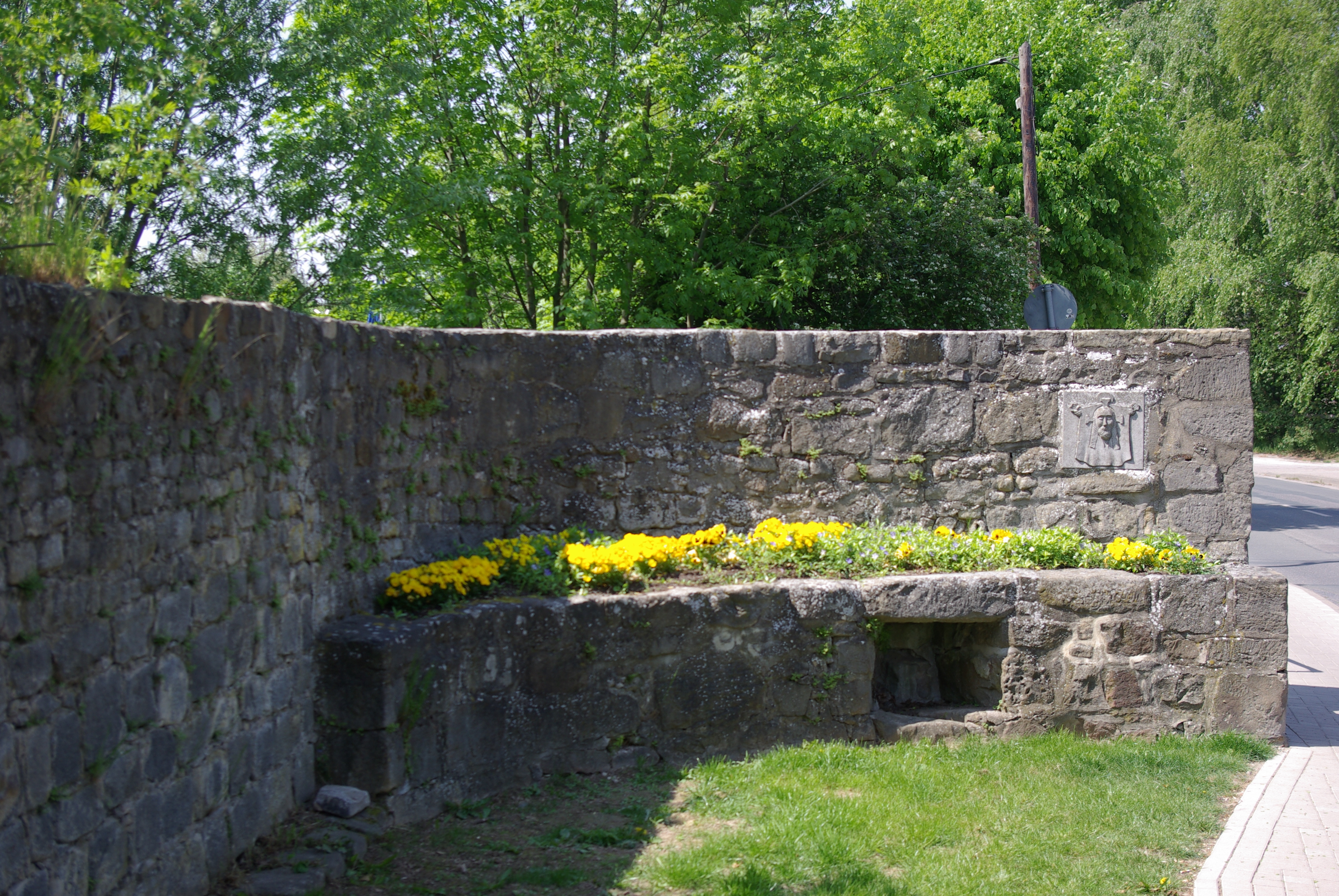
Remains of the city wall

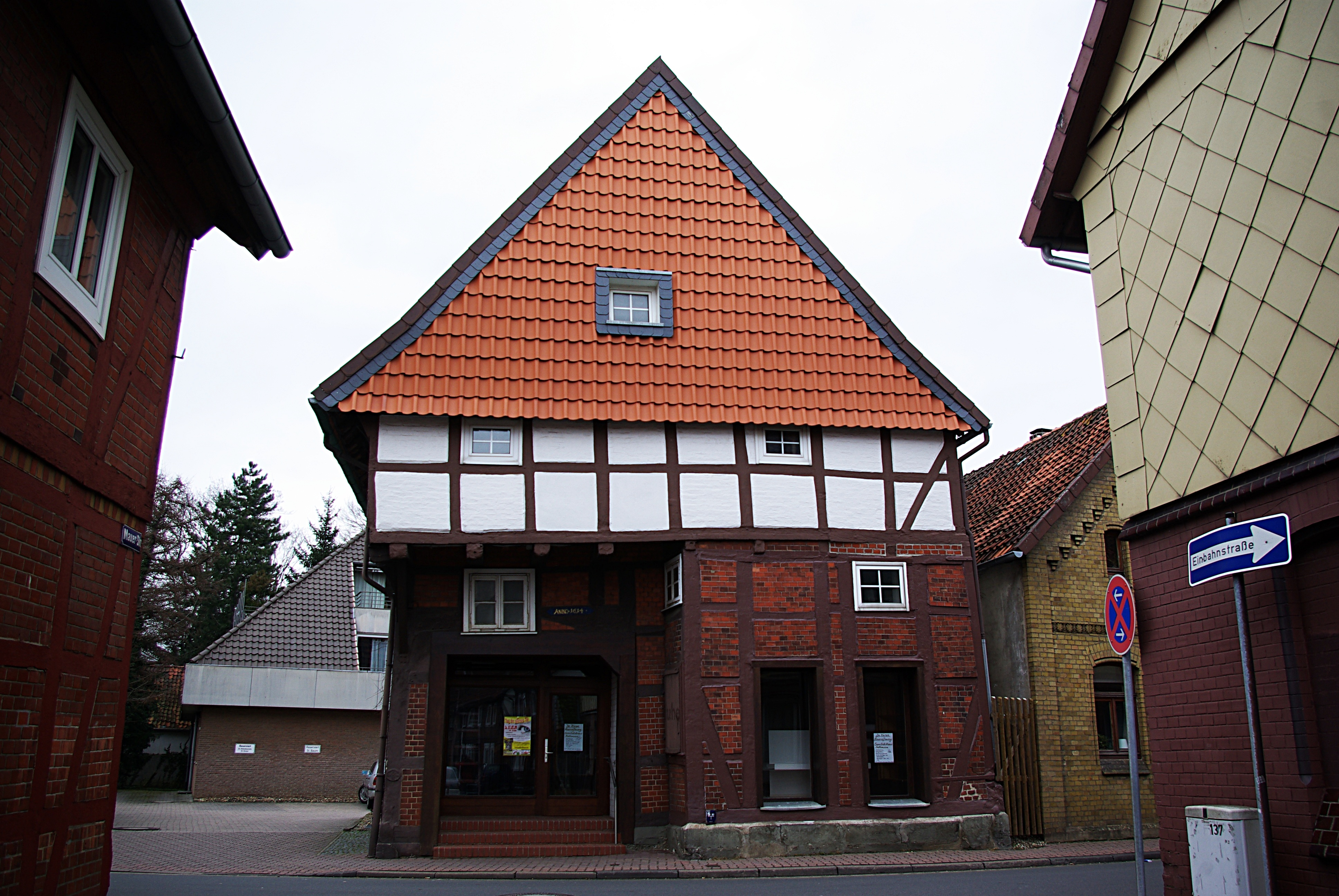
Oldest house of Pattensen, built 1614

== Economy ==
The letter processing center for the greater Hanover area is located in Pattensen. The town is home to numerous small and medium-sized companies.

== Twin towns ==
Pattensen is twinned with:

Ahrensfelde, Germany
Karpniki, Poland
Saint-Aubin-lès-Elbeuf, France
Wilkszyn, Poland

== Gallery ==
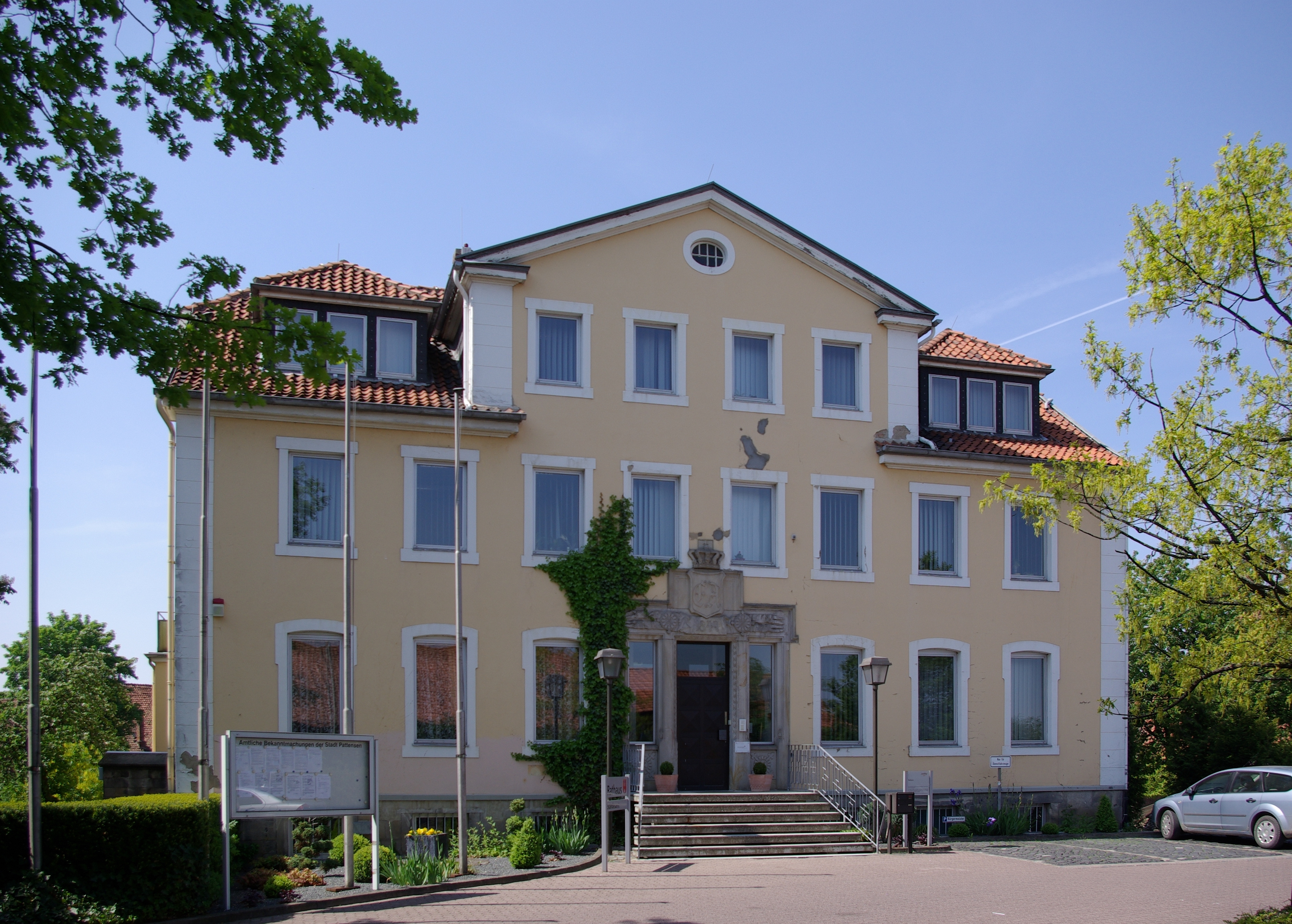
Old town hall (built 1849)

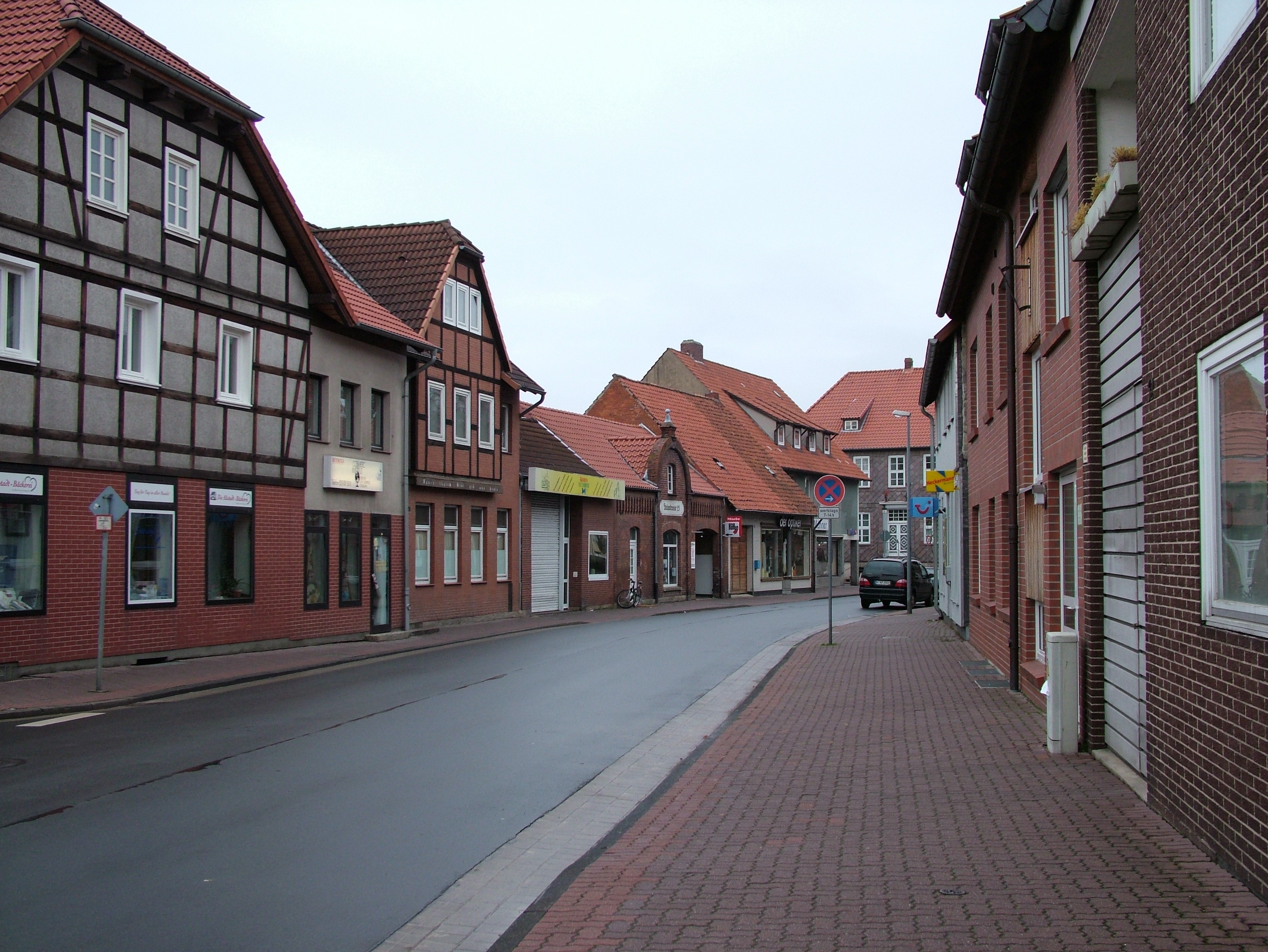
Steinstraße

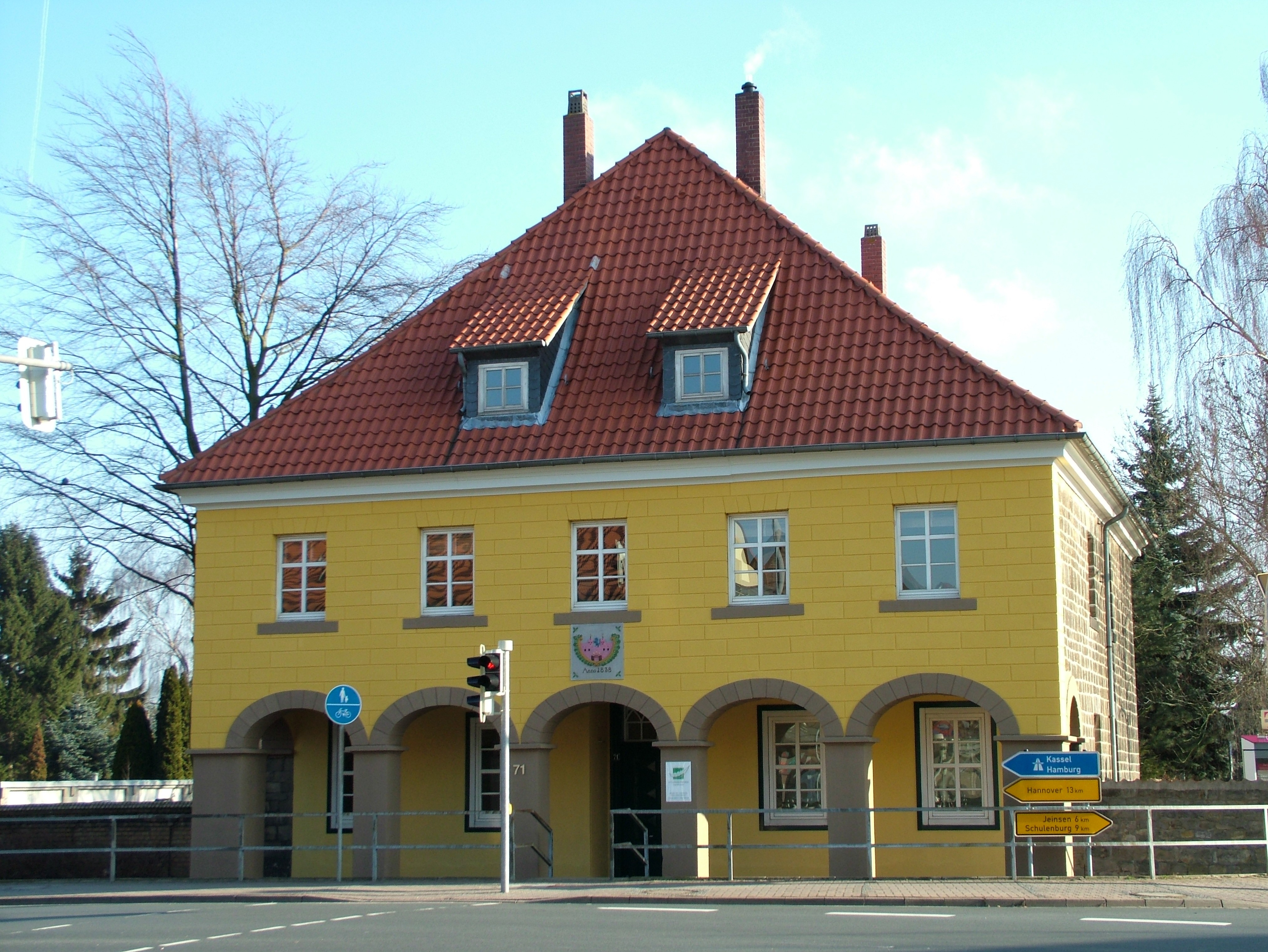
Alte Wache (built 1838)

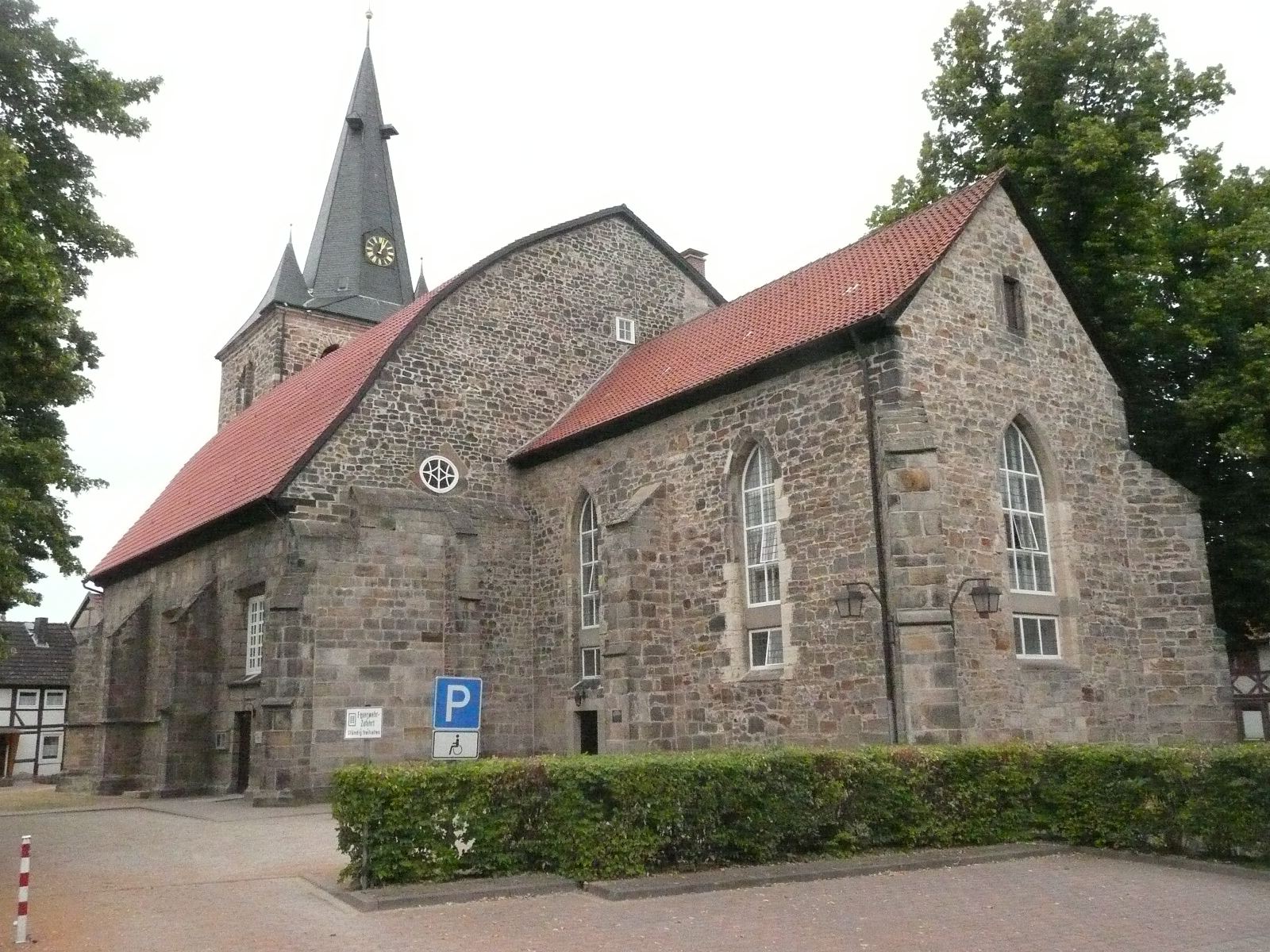
St. Lucas church (built 1150–1180)

== Notable people ==
- Prince Ernest Augustus of Hanover (1914-1987)
- Prince Ernst August of Hanover (born 1954)
- Annalena Baerbock, (born 1980) Foreign Minister and co-chair of the Alliance 90/The Greens
- Per Mertesacker, (born 1984) football coach and retired player, member of the 2014 FIFA World Cup-winning squad

== See also ==
- Metropolitan region Hannover-Braunschweig-Göttingen-Wolfsburg
