= Powiat średzki =

Powiat średzki may refer to either of two counties (powiats) in Poland:

- Środa County, Lower Silesian Voivodeship (formerly Środa Śląska County), in SW Poland
- Środa County, Greater Poland Voivodeship (formerly Środa Wielkopolska County), in west-central Poland
