= Pisarzowice, Gmina Miękinia =

Pisarzowice
- Village
- Location within Poland
- Coordinates: 51°12′33.4″N 16°51′04.4″E
- Country: Poland
- Voivodeship: Lower Silesian
- County: Środa
- Gmina: Miękinia
- Time zone: UTC+1 (CET)
  - Summer (DST): UTC+2 (CEST)
- Vehicle registration: DSR
- Website: http://www.miekinia.pl/portal/04_tresc_pis.php

Pisarzowice [pisaʐɔˈvit͡sɛ] is a village in the administrative district of Gmina Miękinia, within Środa County, Lower Silesian Voivodeship, in southwestern Poland.
