= Zabór Wielki =

- Village
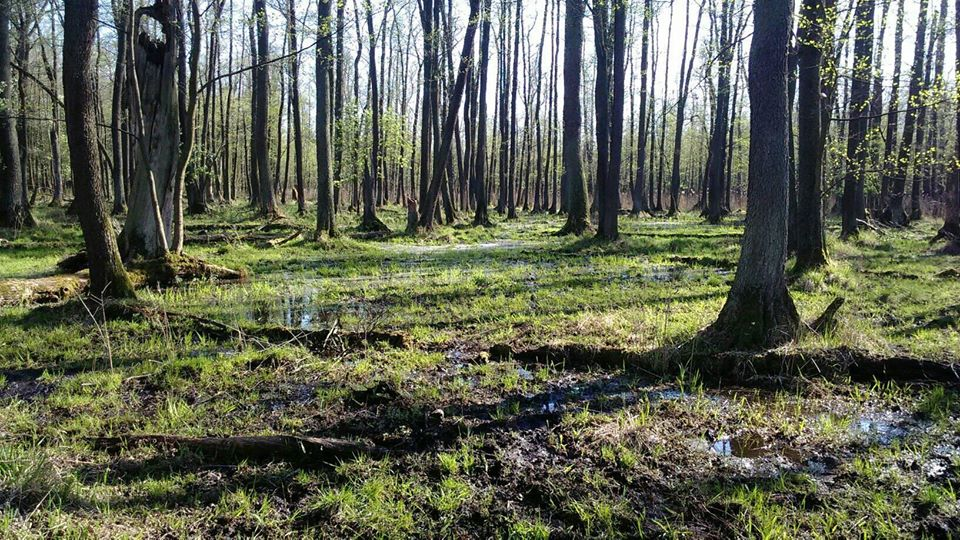
- Nature reserve Zabór

- Location within Poland
- Coordinates: 51°13′N 16°44′E
- Country: Poland
- Voivodeship: Lower Silesian
- County: Środa
- Gmina: Miękinia
- Time zone: UTC+1 (CET)
  - Summer (DST): UTC+2 (CEST)
- Vehicle registration: DSR

Zabór Wielki (Polish pronunciation: [ˈzabur ˈvjɛlkʲi]) is a village in the administrative district of Gmina Miękinia, within Środa County, Lower Silesian Voivodeship, in south-western Poland.

The name of the village is of Polish origin and comes from the words za and bór, meaning "behind a coniferous forest".

In 1842, the village had a population of 244.

The Nature reserve Zabór is located near Zabór Wielki.
