= Mrozów =

- Village
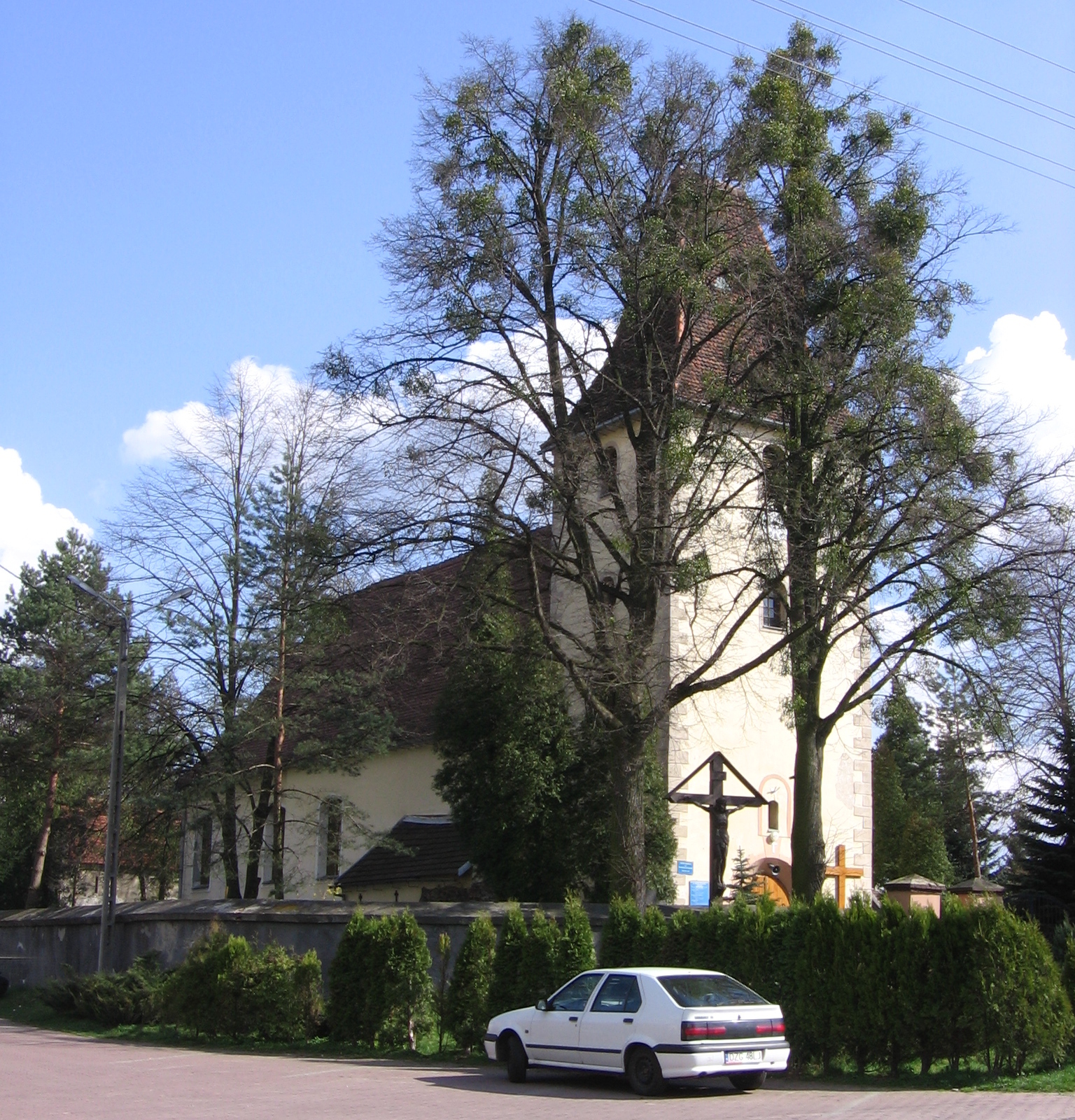
- Our Victorious Lady Church

- Location within Poland
- Coordinates: 51°11′16″N 16°47′16″E
- Country: Poland
- Voivodeship: Lower Silesian
- County: Środa
- Gmina: Miękinia
- Population: 1,100
- Time zone: UTC+1 (CET)
  - Summer (DST): UTC+2 (CEST)
- Vehicle registration: DSR

Mrozów [ˈmrɔzuf] is a village in the administrative district of Gmina Miękinia, within Środa County, Lower Silesian Voivodeship, in south-western Poland.
