= Wojnowice, Gmina Miękinia =

Wojnowice
- Village
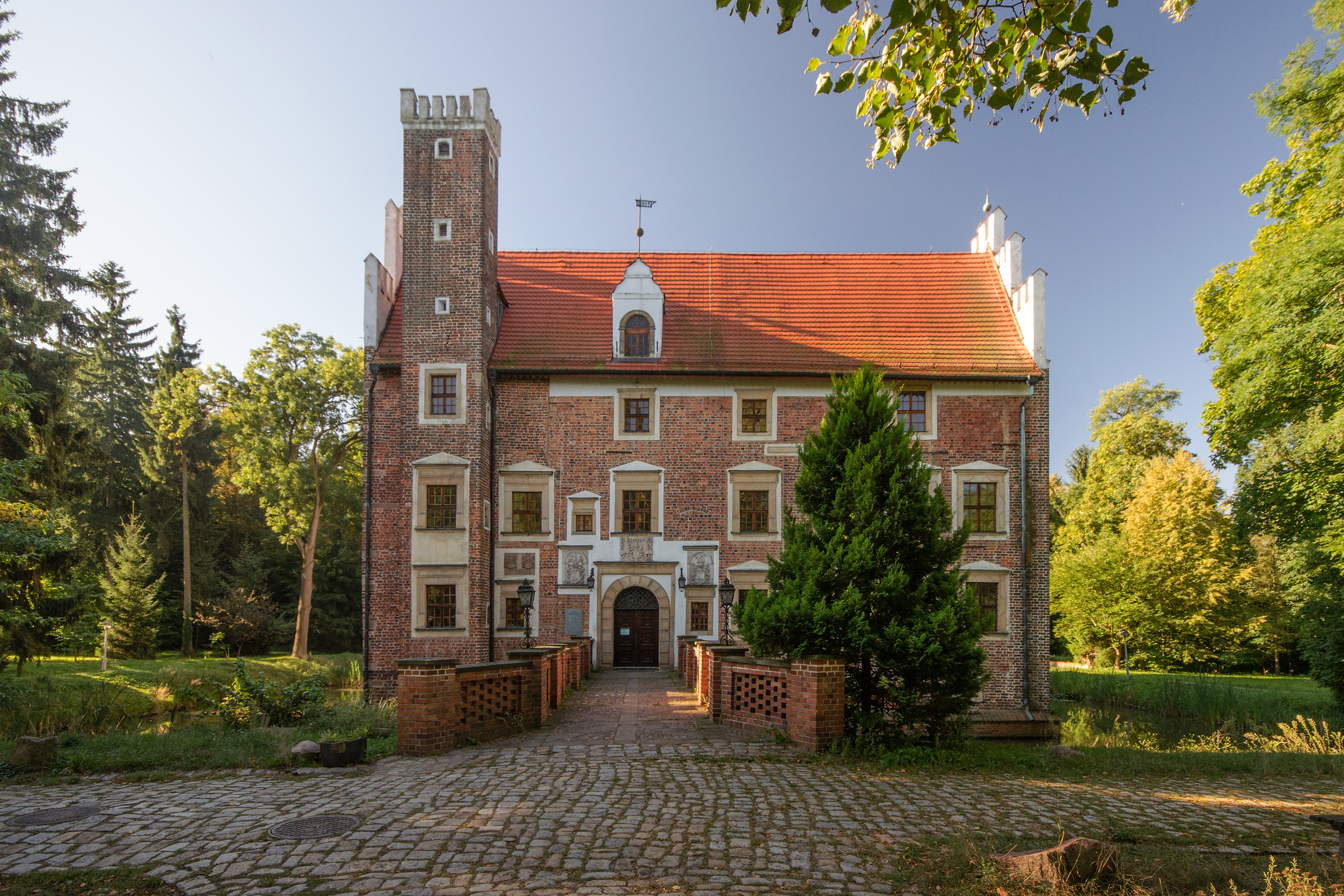
- Castle

- Location within Poland
- Coordinates: 51°12′07″N 16°47′45″E
- Country: Poland
- Voivodeship: Lower Silesian
- County: Środa
- Gmina: Miękinia
- Population: 333
- Time zone: UTC+1 (CET)
  - Summer (DST): UTC+2 (CEST)
- Vehicle registration: DSR

Wojnowice [vɔi̯nɔˈvit͡sɛ] is a village in the administrative district of Gmina Miękinia, within Środa County, Lower Silesian Voivodeship, in south-western Poland.
