= Środa County =

Two counties (powiats) in Poland may be referred to in English by this name, as in Polish they are both named powiat średzki (which means "powiat of Środa").

- Środa County, Lower Silesian Voivodeship (formerly Środa Śląska County; SW Poland)
- Środa County, Greater Poland Voivodeship (formerly Środa Wielkopolska County; west-central Poland)
