= Kadłub, Lower Silesian Voivodeship =

Kadłub
- Village
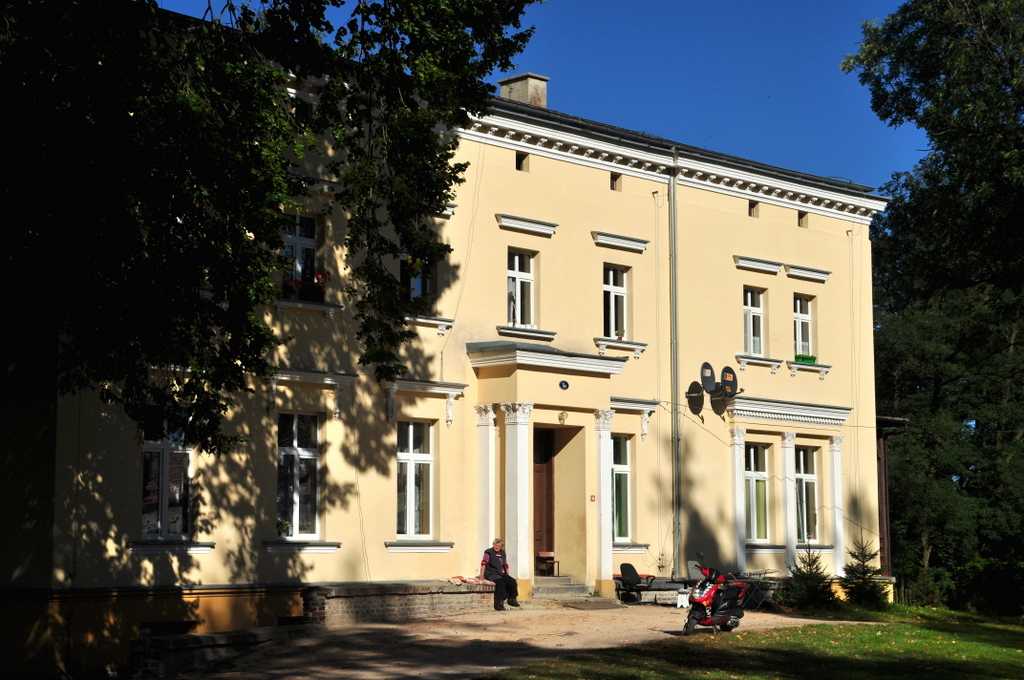

- Location within Poland
- Coordinates: 51°10′27″N 16°41′46″E
- Country: Poland
- Voivodeship: Lower Silesian
- County: Środa
- Gmina: Miękinia
- Time zone: UTC+1 (CET)
  - Summer (DST): UTC+2 (CEST)
- Vehicle registration: DSR

Kadłub [ˈkadwup] (German: Kadlau) is a village in the administrative district of Gmina Miękinia, within Środa County, Lower Silesian Voivodeship, in south-western Poland.
