= Miękinia, Lower Silesian Voivodeship =

Miękinia
- Town
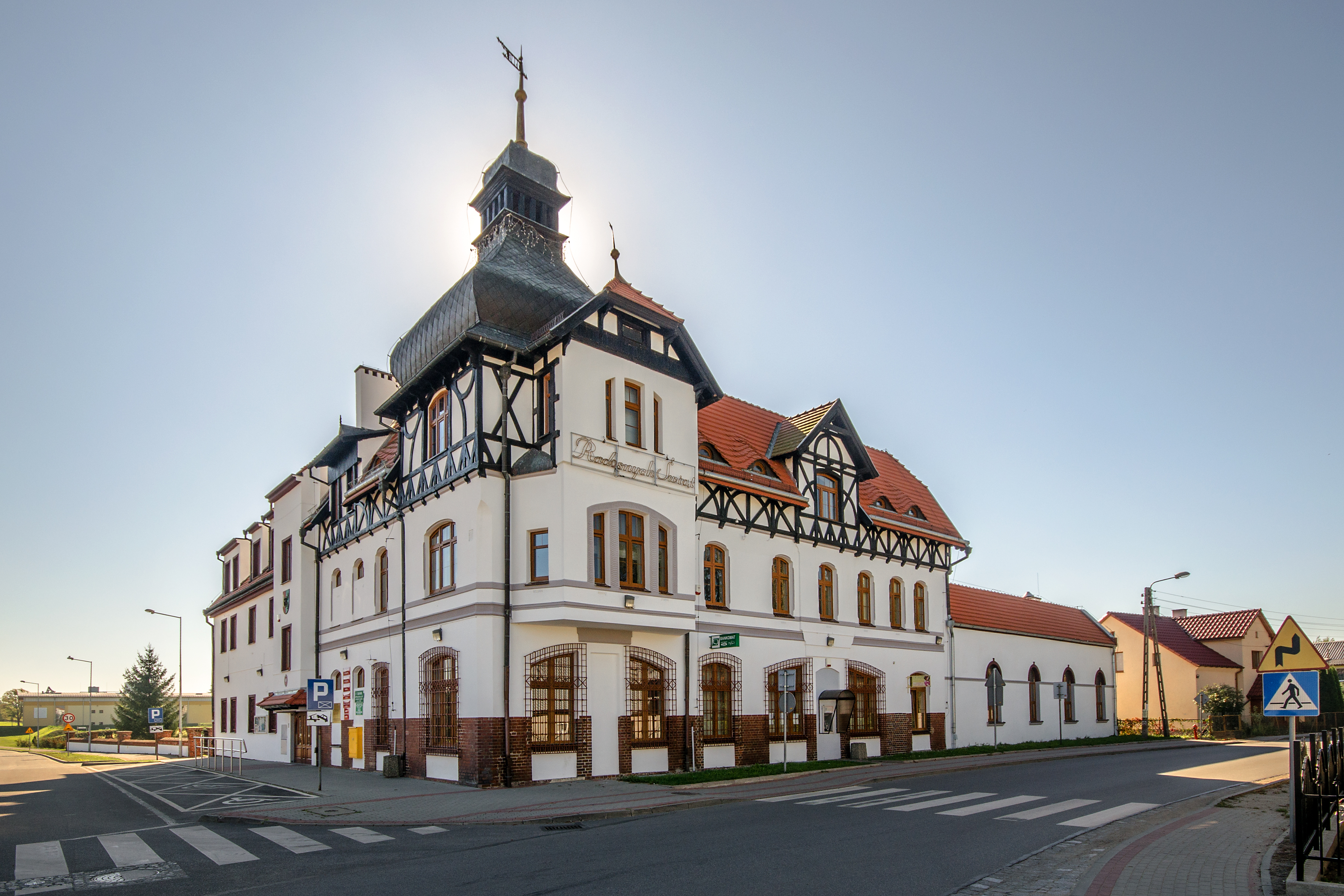
- Municipal office building

- Coat of arms

- Location within Poland
- Coordinates: 51°10′N 16°46′E
- Country: Poland
- Voivodeship: Lower Silesian
- County: Środa
- Gmina: Miękinia
- Town rights: January 1, 2023

Government
  - Mayor: Jan Grzegorczyn

Population
  - Total: 2,078
- Time zone: UTC+1 (CET)
  - Summer (DST): UTC+2 (CEST)
- Vehicle registration: DSR

Miękinia ([mjɛnˈkiɲa]) (German: Nimkau) is a town in Środa County, Lower Silesian Voivodeship, in south-western Poland. It is the seat of the administrative district (gmina) called Gmina Miękinia.

The town has a population of 2078.

Miękinia is one of the places of winemaking in Poland.

== History ==
It was also formerly known in Polish as Niemkini. Until 1787 it was a possession of the Jesuits from Wrocław. In 1843, it had a population of 826.

== Transport ==
National road 94 bypasses Miękinia to the south.

Voivodeship road 341 bypasses Miękinia to the east.

Miękinia has a station on the Legnica-Wrocław railway line.

== Sports ==
The local football club is Pogoń Miękinia. It competes in the lower leagues.

== Notable people ==
- Robert Hermann Raudner (1854–1915), German landscape and genre painter, and etcher.
