= Robert Hermann Raudner =

German painter

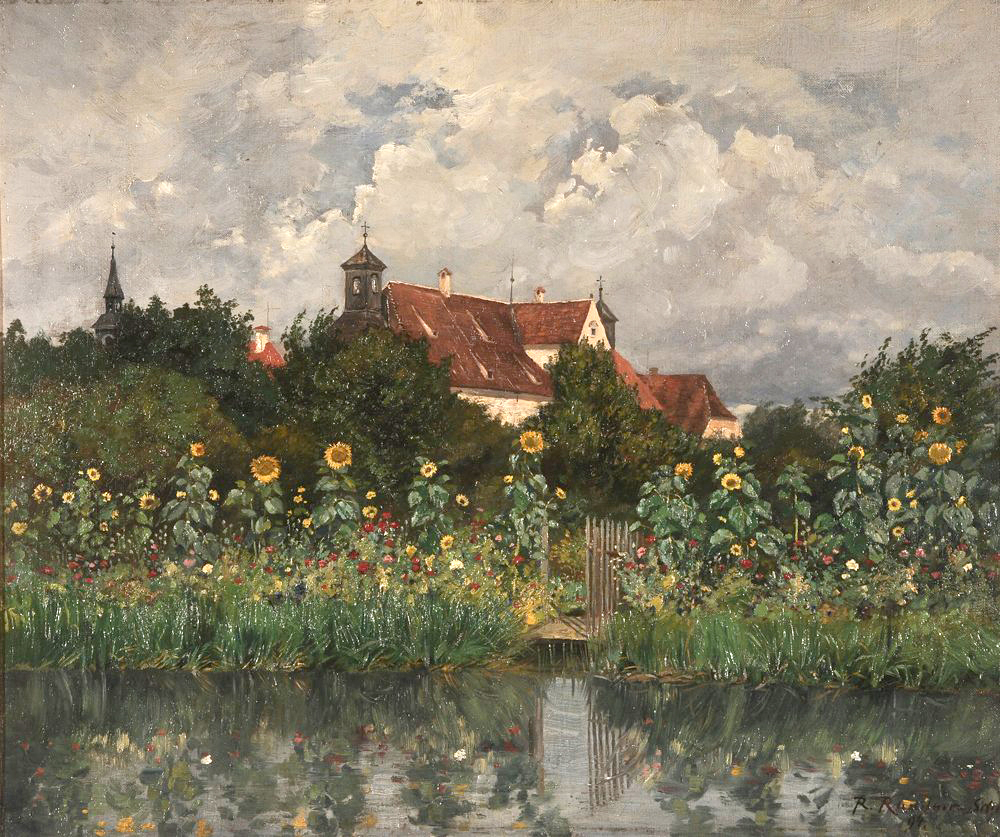
Town and Garden with Sunflowers by a Pond, Robert Raudner (1894)

Robert Hermann Raudner (1854–1915) was a German landscape and genre painter, and etcher.

Raudner was born on 21 January 1854 in Nimkau, Silesia, the son of a telegraphist. He studied painting from October 1878 in the antique class—drawing after the antique—of the Royal Academy of Fine Arts in Munich; at his matriculation Raudner gave Benau near Sorau as his birthplace. His fellow Academy students were Gyula Benczúr, Alexander Strähuber, Johann Leonhard Raab and Ludwig von Löfftz. After study Raudner worked in the Munich municipality of Schleißheim, mainly on landscape painting and etching. He exhibited works in the Munich Glass Palace in 1897 and 1899.

Raudner died aged 60 on 14 January 1915 at Munich. A street at Schleißheim is named after him.

== Bibliography ==
Thieme, Ulrich; Becker, Felix; "Raudner, Robert" in Allgemeines Lexikon der Bildenden Künstler von der Antike bis zur Gegenwart, Hans Vollmer (ed.), Ramsden–Rosa. E. A. Seemann, Leipzig (1934), Volume 28, p. 41 (in German).
