= Gmina Miękinia =

Gmina Miękinia Miękinia Commune
- Gmina
- Coat of arms
- Interactive map of Gmina Miękinia
- Coordinates (Miękinia): 51°10′N 16°46′E
- Country: Poland
- Voivodeship: Lower Silesian
- County: Środa
- Seat: Miękinia
- Sołectwos: Białków, Błonie, Brzezina, Brzezinka Średzka, Czerna, Gałów, Głoska, Gosławice, Kadłub, Krępice, Księginice, Lenartowice, Łowęcice, Lubiatów, Lutynia, Miękinia, Mrozów, Pisarzowice, Prężyce, Radakowice, Wilkostów, Wilkszyn, Wojnowice, Wróblowice, Zabór Wielki, Zakrzyce, Źródła, Żurawiniec

Area
  - Total: 179.48 km^{2} (69.30 sq mi)

Population (2019-06-30)
  - Total: 16,603
  - Density: 92.506/km^{2} (239.59/sq mi)
- Website: https://www.miekinia.pl/

Gmina Miękinia is a rural gmina (administrative district) in Środa County, Lower Silesian Voivodeship, in south-western Poland. Its seat is in Miękinia, which lies approximately 13 kilometres (8 mi) east of Środa Śląska, and 20 kilometres (12 mi) west of the regional capital Wrocław.

The gmina covers an area of 179.48 square kilometres (69.3 sq mi), and as of 2019 its total population was 16,603. It is part of the larger Wrocław metropolitan area.

== Neighbouring gminas ==
Gmina Miękinia is bordered by the town of Wrocław and the gminas of Brzeg Dolny, Kąty Wrocławskie, Kostomłoty, Oborniki Śląskie and Środa Śląska.

== Villages ==
The gmina contains the villages of Białków, Błonie, Brzezina, Brzezinka Średzka, Czerna, Gałów, Głoska, Gosławice, Kadłub, Krępice, Księginice, Lenartowice, Łowęcice, Lubiatów, Lutynia, Miękinia, Mrozów, Pisarzowice, Prężyce, Radakowice, Wilkostów, Wilkszyn, Wojnowice, Wróblowice, Zabór Wielki, Zakrzyce, Źródła and Żurawiniec.

== Conservation of nature ==
Within the area of Miękinia, lies Nature Reserve "Zabór". The purpose of the reserve is to preserve the riparian forest for scientific and didactic reasons.

== Twin towns – sister cities ==
Gmina Miękinia is twinned with:

- Oria, Italy
- Schwarmstedt, Germany
