= Wilkszyn =

- Village
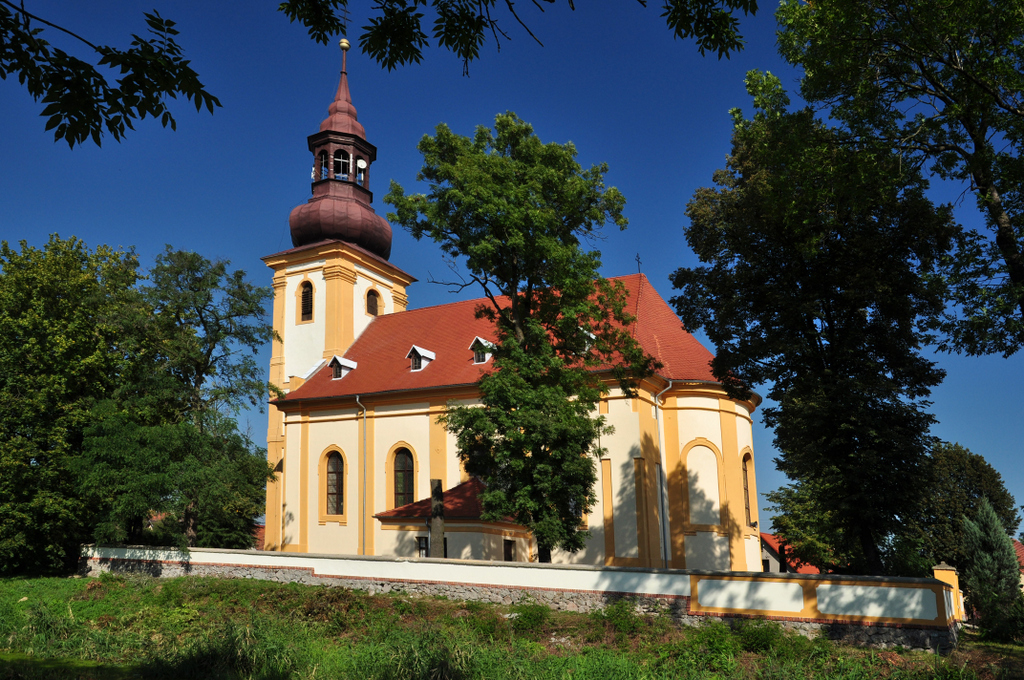
- Saint Lawrence church in Wilkszyn

- Location within Poland
- Coordinates: 51°11′30″N 16°51′45″E
- Country: Poland
- Voivodeship: Lower Silesian
- County: Środa
- Gmina: Miękinia
- Population: 1,188
- Time zone: UTC+1 (CET)
  - Summer (DST): UTC+2 (CEST)
- Vehicle registration: DSR
- Website: http://www.miekinia.pl/www/index.php?item=10352

Wilkszyn [ˈvilkʂɨn] is a village in the administrative district of Gmina Miękinia, within Środa County, Lower Silesian Voivodeship, in south-western Poland.
