= Środa County, Lower Silesian Voivodeship =

Coordinates: 51°09′N 16°35′E

Środa County Powiat średzki
- County
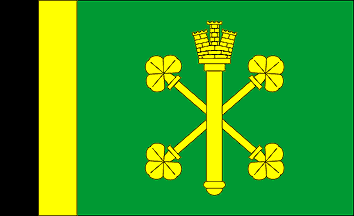
- Flag Coat of arms

- Location within the voivodeship
- Country: Poland
- Voivodeship: Lower Silesian
- Seat: Środa Śląska
- Gminas: Total 5: Gmina Kostomłoty; Gmina Malczyce; Gmina Miękinia; Gmina Środa Śląska; Gmina Udanin

Area
  - Total: 703.68 km^{2} (271.69 sq mi)

Population (2019-06-30)
  - Total: 54,646
  - Density: 77.657/km^{2} (201.13/sq mi)
  - Urban: 9,516
  - Rural: 45,130
- Car plates: DSR
- Website: www.powiat-sredzki.pl

Środa County (/ˈʃroʊdə ˈʃlɒ̃skə/; Polish: powiat średzki [ˈpɔvjat ˈɕrɛt͡skʲi], formerly Środa Śląska County) is a unit of territorial administration and local government (powiat) in Lower Silesian Voivodeship, south-western Poland. It came into being on January 1, 1999, as a result of the Polish local government reforms passed in 1998. The county covers an area of 703.7 square kilometres (271.7 sq mi). Its administrative seat and only town is Środa Śląska.

As of 2019 the total population of the county is 54,646, out of which the population of Środa Śląska accounts for 9,516, while the rural population is 45,130.

== Neighbouring counties ==
Środa County is bordered by Wołów County to the north, Trzebnica County to the north-east, the city of Wrocław and Wrocław County to the east, Świdnica County to the south, and Jawor County and Legnica County to the west.

== Administrative divisions ==
The county is subdivided into five gminas (one urban-rural and four rural). These are listed in the following table, in descending order of population.

Gmina	Type	Area (km²)	Population (2019)	Seat
Gmina Środa Śląska	urban-rural	214.9	19,862	Środa Śląska
Gmina Miękinia	rural	179.5	16,603	Miękinia
Gmina Kostomłoty	rural	146.3	7,142	Kostomłoty
Gmina Malczyce	rural	52.6	5,957	Malczyce
Gmina Udanin	rural	110.7	5,082	Udanin
