= Immerwahr =

Immerwahr (German pronunciation: [ˈɪmɐvaːɐ̯]) is a surname. Notable people with the surname include:

- Clara Immerwahr (1870–1915), German chemist
- Daniel Immerwahr, American historian
- Sara Anderson Immerwahr (1914–2008), American Classical archaeologist
- Stephen Immerwahr, American musician
