= Cesarzowice =

Cesarzowice may refer to the following villages in Poland:

- Cesarzowice, Gmina Środa Śląska in Środa County, Lower Silesian Voivodeship (SW Poland)
- Cesarzowice, Wrocław County in Wrocław County, Lower Silesian Voivodeship (SW Poland)
