= Słup =

Słup (pronounced swoop) may refer to the following places:

- In Lower Silesian Voivodeship in southwest Poland:
  - Słup, Jawor County in Gmina Męcinka
  - Słup, Gmina Środa Śląska, Środa County
  - Słup, Wołów County in Gmina Wińsko
  - Słup Lake, a reservoir
- Słup, Kuyavian-Pomeranian Voivodeship (north-central Poland)
- Słup, Garwolin County, Masovian Voivodeship (east-central Poland)
- Słup, Gostynin County, Masovian Voivodeship (east-central Poland)
- Słup, Braniewo County, Warmian-Masurian Voivodeship (north Poland)
- Słup, Działdowo County, Warmian-Masurian Voivodeship (north Poland)

== See also ==
- Slup (disambiguation)
