= Jastrzębce =

Jastrzębce may refer to the following places in Poland:

- Jastrzębce, Lower Silesian Voivodeship (south-west Poland)
- Jastrzębce, Pomeranian Voivodeship (north Poland)
