= Proszkow =

Proszkow may refer to either of the following places in Poland:

- Prószków, a town in Opole Voivodeship (southern Poland)
- Proszków, a village in Lower Silesian Voivodeship (south-western Poland)
