= Wrocisławice =

- Village
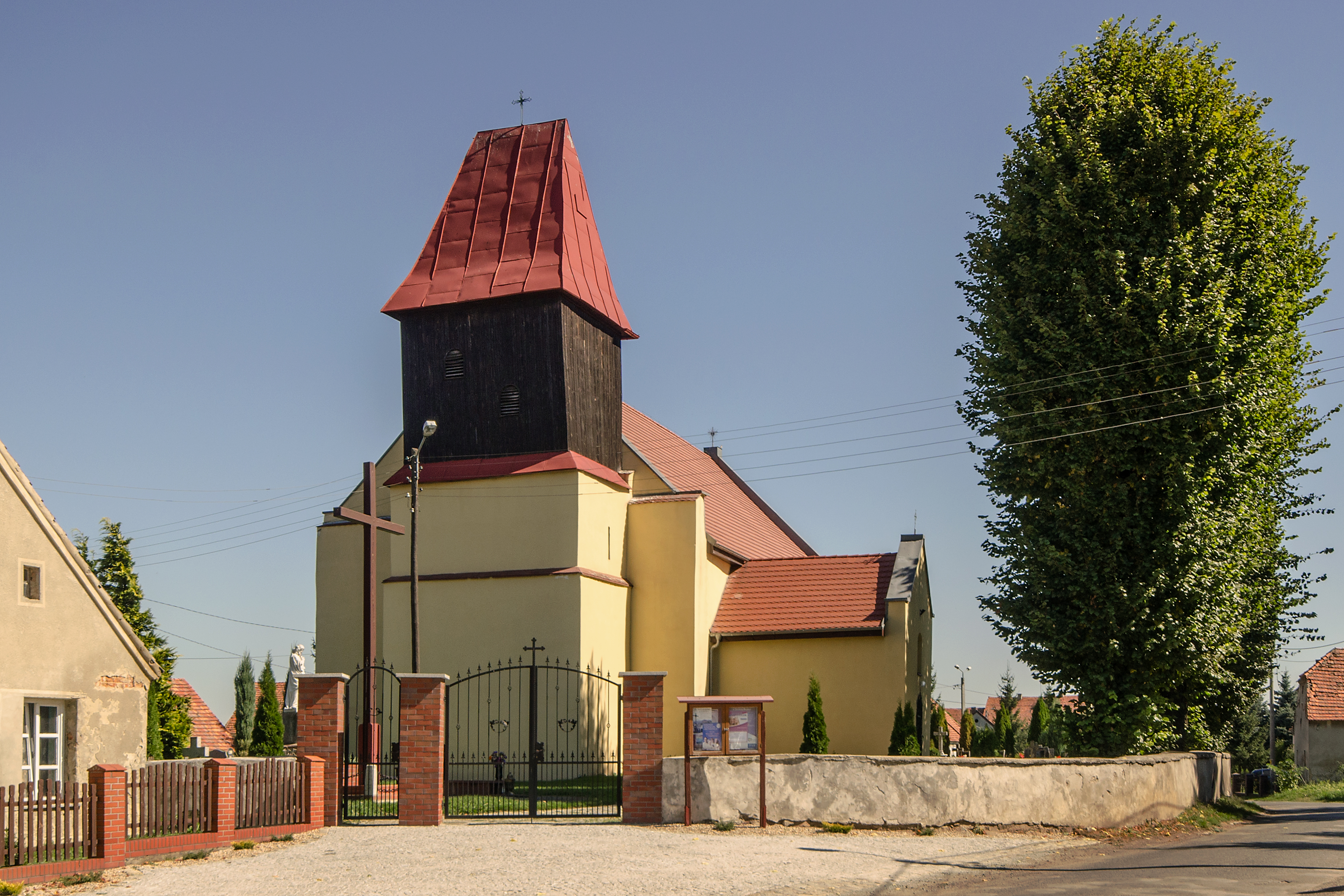
- Church of Saint Lawrence

- Location within Poland
- Coordinates: 51°07′46″N 16°29′33″E
- Country: Poland
- Voivodeship: Lower Silesian
- County: Środa
- Gmina: Środa Śląska

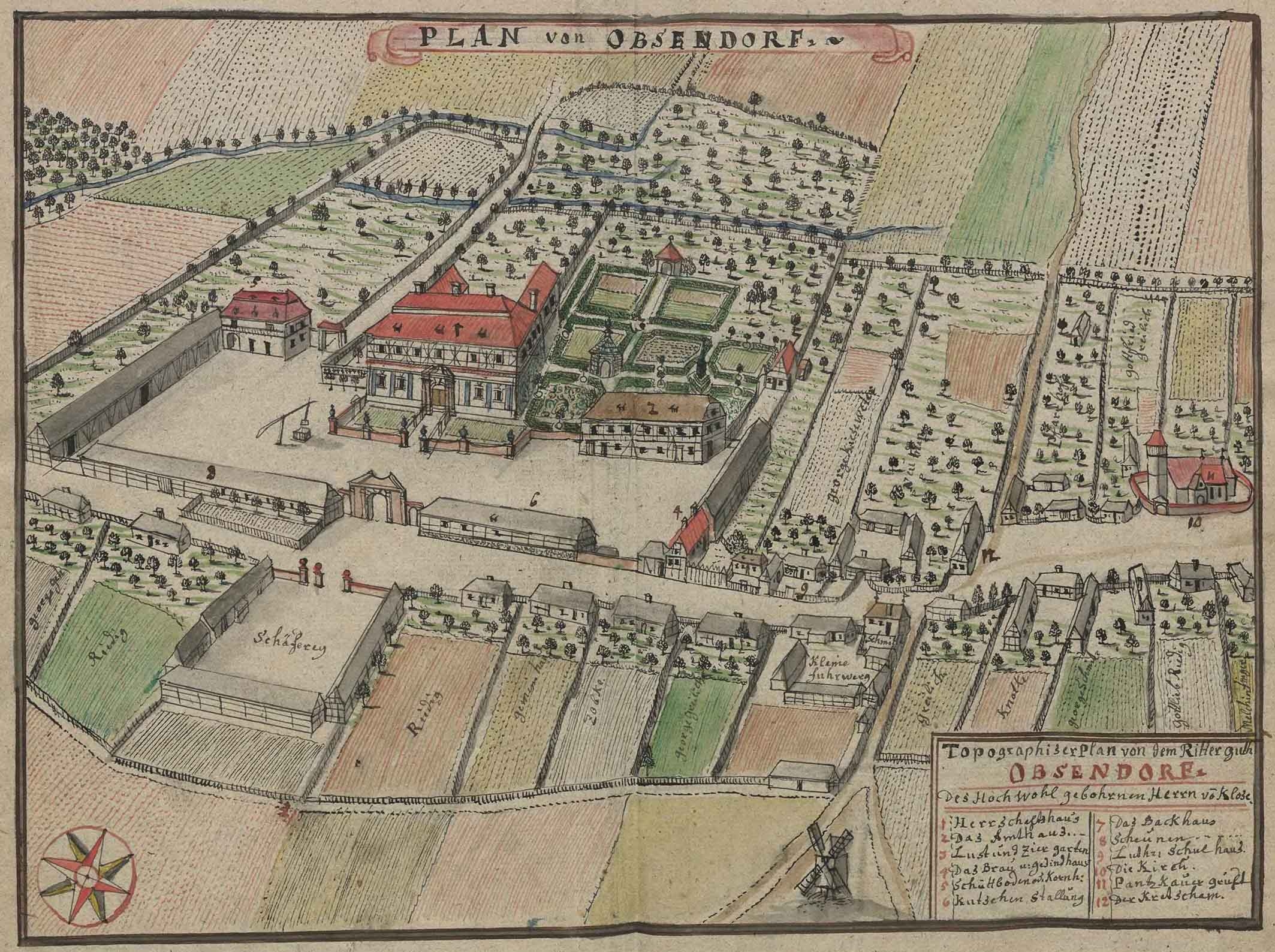
A map of the village by F.B. Wernher, 18th century

Wrocisławice [vrɔt͡ɕiswaˈvit͡sɛ] is a village in Lower Silesia, in the administrative district of Gmina Środa Śląska within Środa County, Lower Silesian Voivodeship, in south-western Poland.

The beginnings of the village probably go back to the Middle Ages (the neighboring village of Bukówek was founded in 1282). The present church of St Lawrence was built in the first half of the 17th century and features an 18th-century altar painting of St Lawrence with a splendid polychrome wooden frame and a baroque painting of St Nicolaus.
