= Slup =

Slup may refer to:

- Slup, Czech Republic, a municipality and village
- Slup, Kosovo, a village

== See also ==
- Słup (disambiguation)
