= Przedmoście =

Przedmoście may refer to:

- Przedmoście, Głogów County, in Lower Silesian Voivodeship (SW Poland)
- Przedmoście, Gmina Środa Śląska in Środa County, Lower Silesian Voivodeship (SW Poland)
