= Kryniczno =

Kryniczno may refer to the following places in Poland:

- Kryniczno, Gmina Środa Śląska in Środa County, Lower Silesian Voivodeship (SW Poland)
- Kryniczno, Trzebnica County in Trzebnica County, Lower Silesian Voivodeship (SW Poland)
