= Ciechów =

- Village
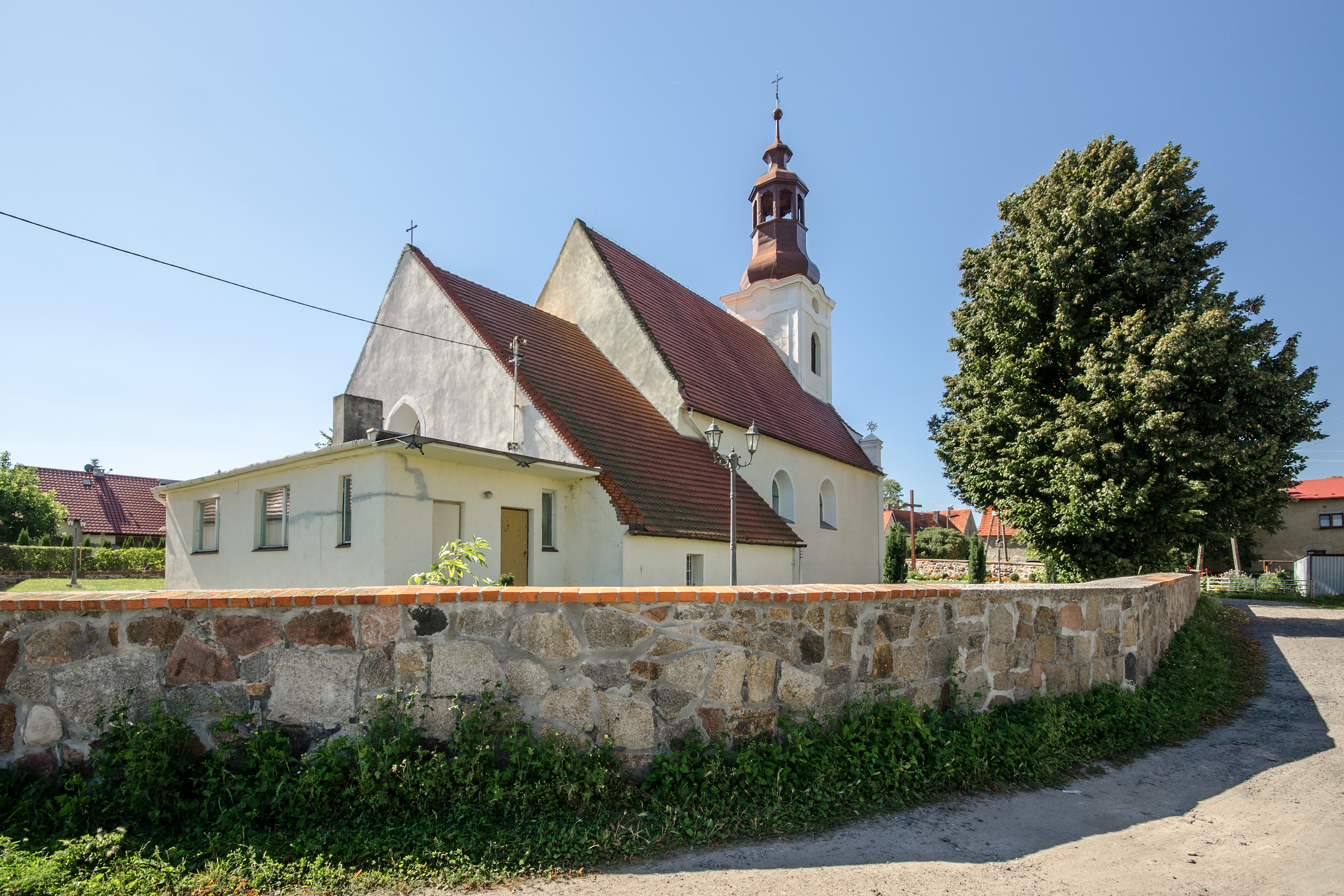
- Church of Our Lady of Help

- Location within Poland
- Coordinates: 51°8′N 16°34′E
- Country: Poland
- Voivodeship: Lower Silesian
- County: Środa
- Gmina: Środa Śląska

Population
  - Total: 1,500
- Time zone: UTC+1 (CET)
  - Summer (DST): UTC+2 (CEST)
- Vehicle registration: DSR

Ciechów [ˈt͡ɕɛxuf] (German: Dietzdorf) is a village in the administrative district of Gmina Środa Śląska, within Środa County, Lower Silesian Voivodeship, in south-western Poland.

== History ==
Since the Middle Ages, the area was part of Piast-ruled Poland, and later on, it was also part of Bohemia (Czechia), Prussia and Germany. During World War II, it was the location of a forced labour subcamp of the Nazi German prison for youth in Wołów. In 1945, following Germany's defeat in World War II, the village became again part of Poland.

== Sports ==
The local football team is Porcelana Ciechów. It competes in the lower leagues.

== See also ==
- Średzka Woda
