= Święte, Lower Silesian Voivodeship =

Święte
- Village
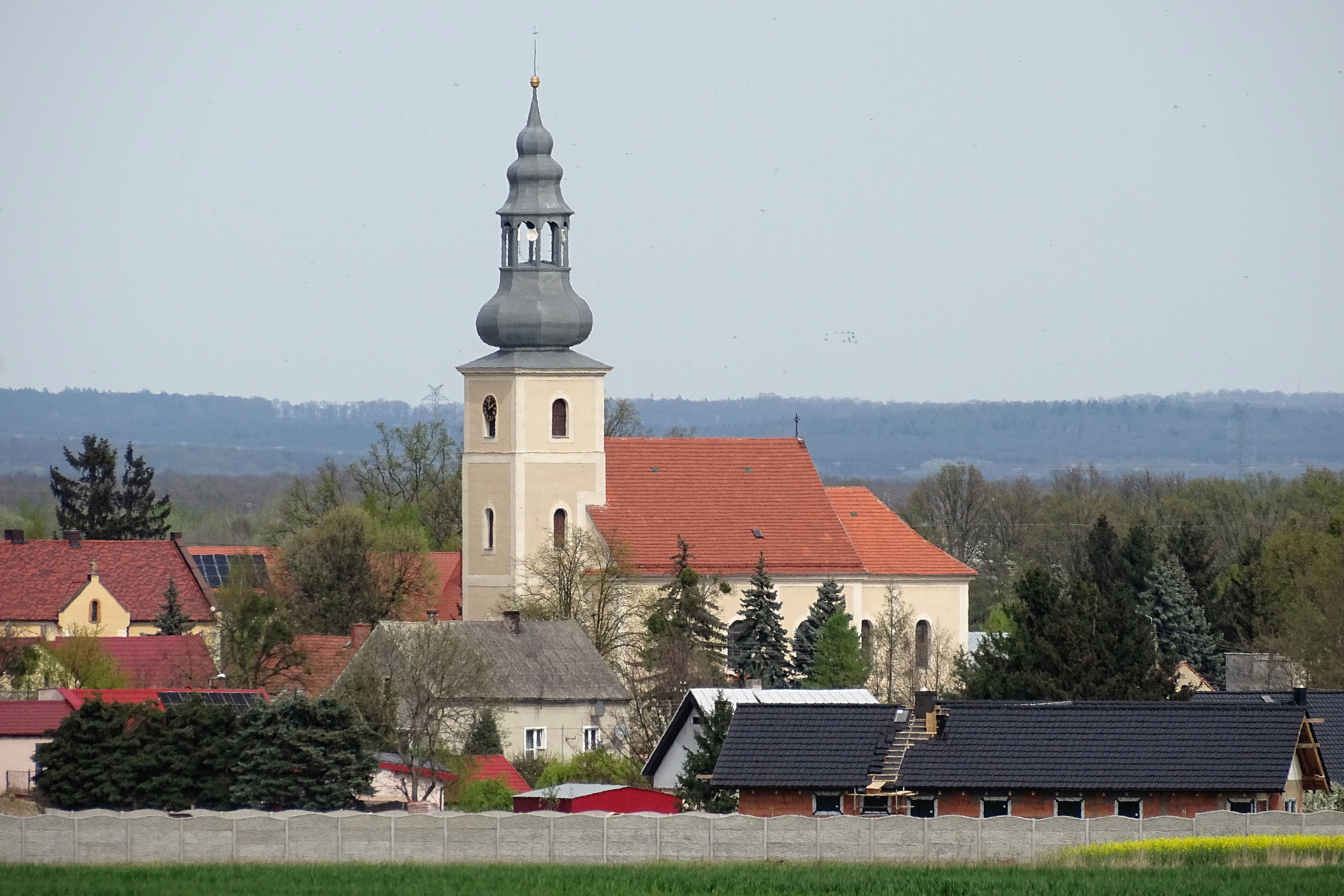

- Location within Poland
- Coordinates: 51°10′55″N 16°39′25″E
- Country: Poland
- Voivodeship: Lower Silesian
- County: Środa
- Gmina: Środa Śląska

Święte (Polish: [ˈɕfjɛntɛ]) is a village in the administrative district of Gmina Środa Śląska, within Środa County, Lower Silesian Voivodeship, in south-western Poland.
