= Rzeczyca, Gmina Środa Śląska =

Rzeczyca
- Village
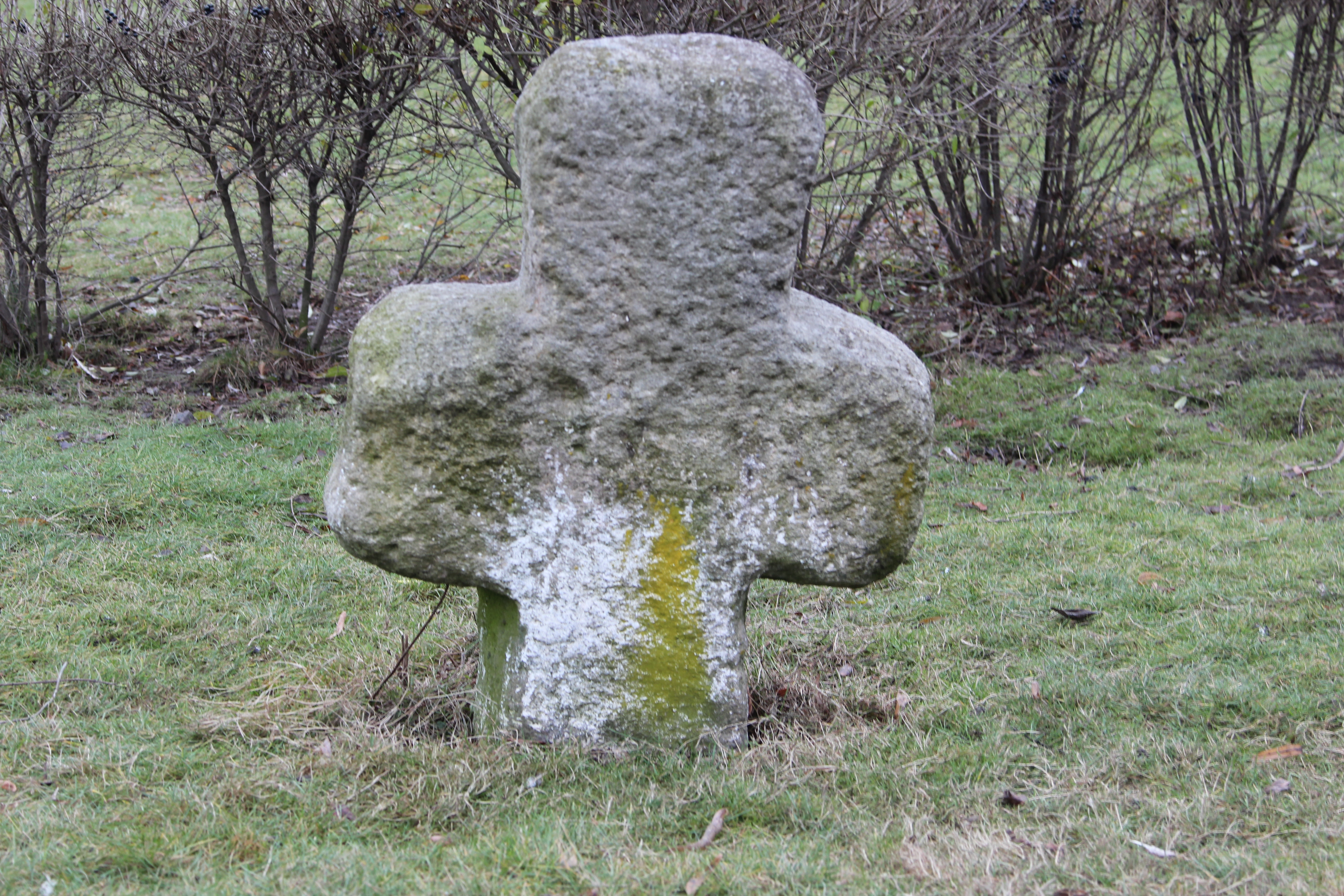
- Stone cross

- Location within Poland
- Coordinates: 51°14′32″N 16°33′14″E
- Country: Poland
- Voivodeship: Lower Silesian
- County: Środa
- Gmina: Środa Śląska

Rzeczyca ([ʐɛˈt͡ʂɨt͡sa]; German: Regnitz) is a village in the administrative district of Gmina Środa Śląska, within Środa County, Lower Silesian Voivodeship, in south-western Poland.
