= Szczepanów, Gmina Środa Śląska =

Szczepanów
- Village
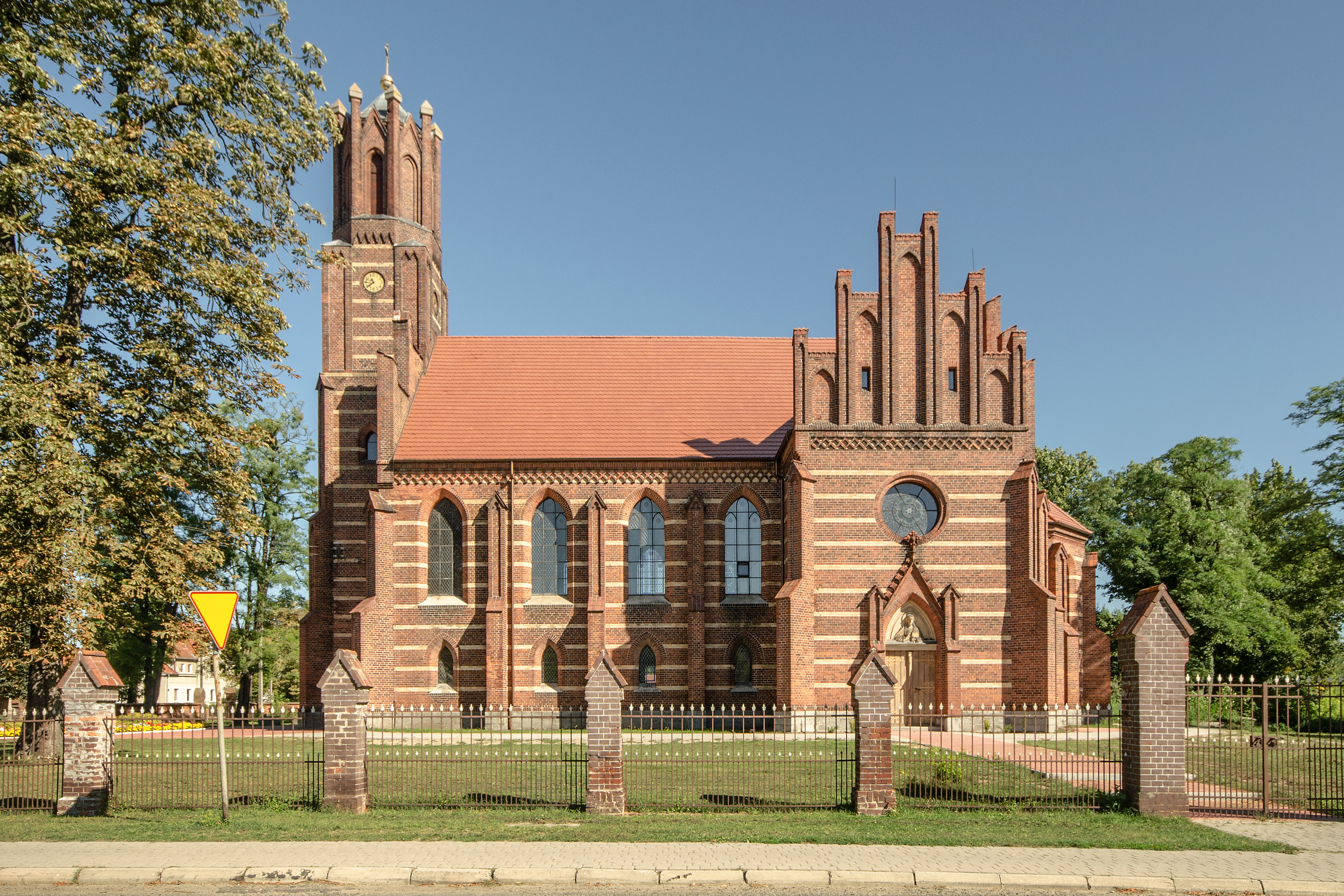
- Church of the Sacred Heart

- Location within Poland
- Coordinates: 51°12′N 16°37′E
- Country: Poland
- Voivodeship: Lower Silesian
- County: Środa
- Gmina: Środa Śląska

Szczepanów [ʂt͡ʂɛˈpanuf] is a village in the administrative district of Gmina Środa Śląska, within Środa County, Lower Silesian Voivodeship, in south-western Poland.

== See also ==
- Średzka Woda
