= Średzka Woda =

Polish river

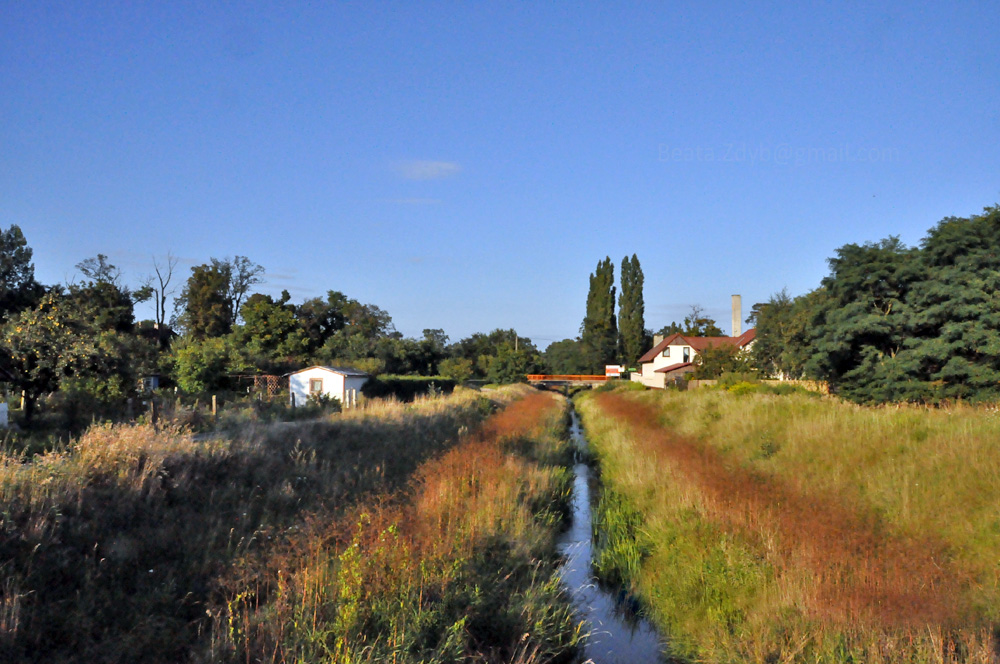
- Średzka Woda in Środa Śląska

Location
- Country: Poland

Physical characteristics
- Source
  - location: Piersno, Środa Śląska County
- Mouth: Oder
  - location: Malczyce
  - coordinates: 51°13′33″N 16°29′41″E
- Length: 32 km

Basin features
- Progression: Oder→ Baltic Sea

The Średzka Woda (Średzianka, German: Neumarkter Wasser) is a second-order river in the Lower Silesia province of Poland, a left-bank tributary of the Oder. It is 32.33 km long with a catchment area of 326.76 km^{2}.

The river flows out of Piersno, Środa Śląska County, on Sredzka Upland, at 158 m above the sea level. At first, it flows north, then turns east and from the south, it flows through Ciechów. Further on, it turns north again and bypasses Chwalimierz, then flows through Środa Śląska, where it crosses the national road no. 94. Below Środa Śląska, its bed splits into two channels. The right one flows through Szczepanów, which is a remnant of the actual watercourse. The left one bypasses Szczepanów from the west, which is the result of land reclamation currently taking over the major part of the flow of the Średzka Woda River. North of Szczepanów, the course of the river changes its orientation to the west. In this place the river leaves the vast Upland and, through the reclamation channel, it flows along the Oder Valley. There it takes over its largest, right-bank tributary, the Jeziówka, and in Malczyce, on the territory of the Malczyce Port, it flows into the Oder.

== See also ==
- List of rivers of Germany
- List of rivers of Poland
