= Komorniki, Gmina Środa Śląska =

Komorniki
- Village
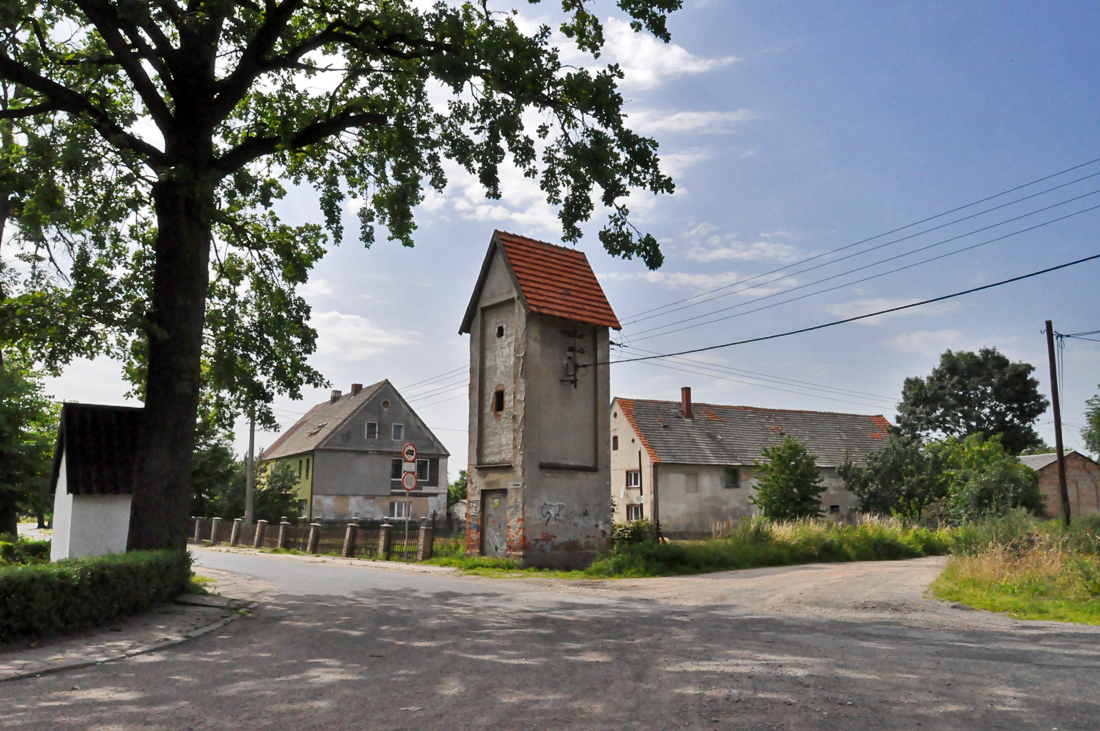
- View of the village

- Location within Poland
- Coordinates: 51°09′56″N 16°38′09″E
- Country: Poland
- Voivodeship: Lower Silesian
- County: Środa
- Gmina: Środa Śląska

Komorniki [kɔmɔrˈniki] (German: Kammendorf) is a village in the administrative district of Gmina Środa Śląska, within Środa County, Lower Silesian Voivodeship, in south-western Poland.
