= Chwalimierz =

- Village
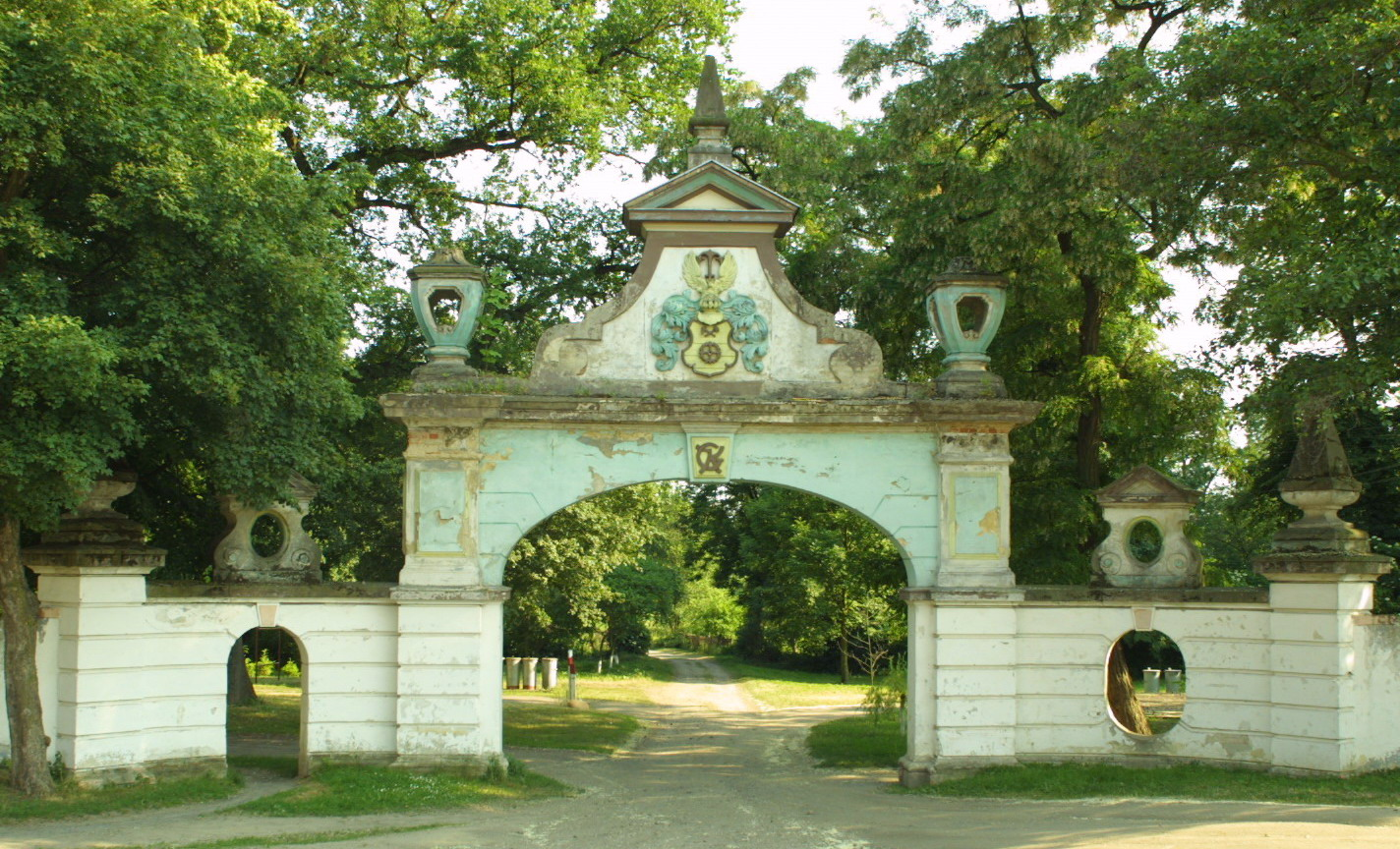
- Gates of Chwalimierz Palace

- Location within Poland
- Coordinates: 51°08′36″N 16°36′04″E
- Country: Poland
- Voivodeship: Lower Silesian
- County: Środa
- Gmina: Środa Śląska

Chwalimierz [xfaˈlimjɛʂ] (German: Frankenthal) is a village in the administrative district of Gmina Środa Śląska, within Środa County, Lower Silesian Voivodeship, in south-western Poland.

The merchant Georg von Kramsta had a Neo-Renaissance palace built here around the year 1885, that was destroyed during World War II.

== See also ==
- Średzka Woda
