= Piersno, Gmina Kostomłoty =

Piersno
- Village
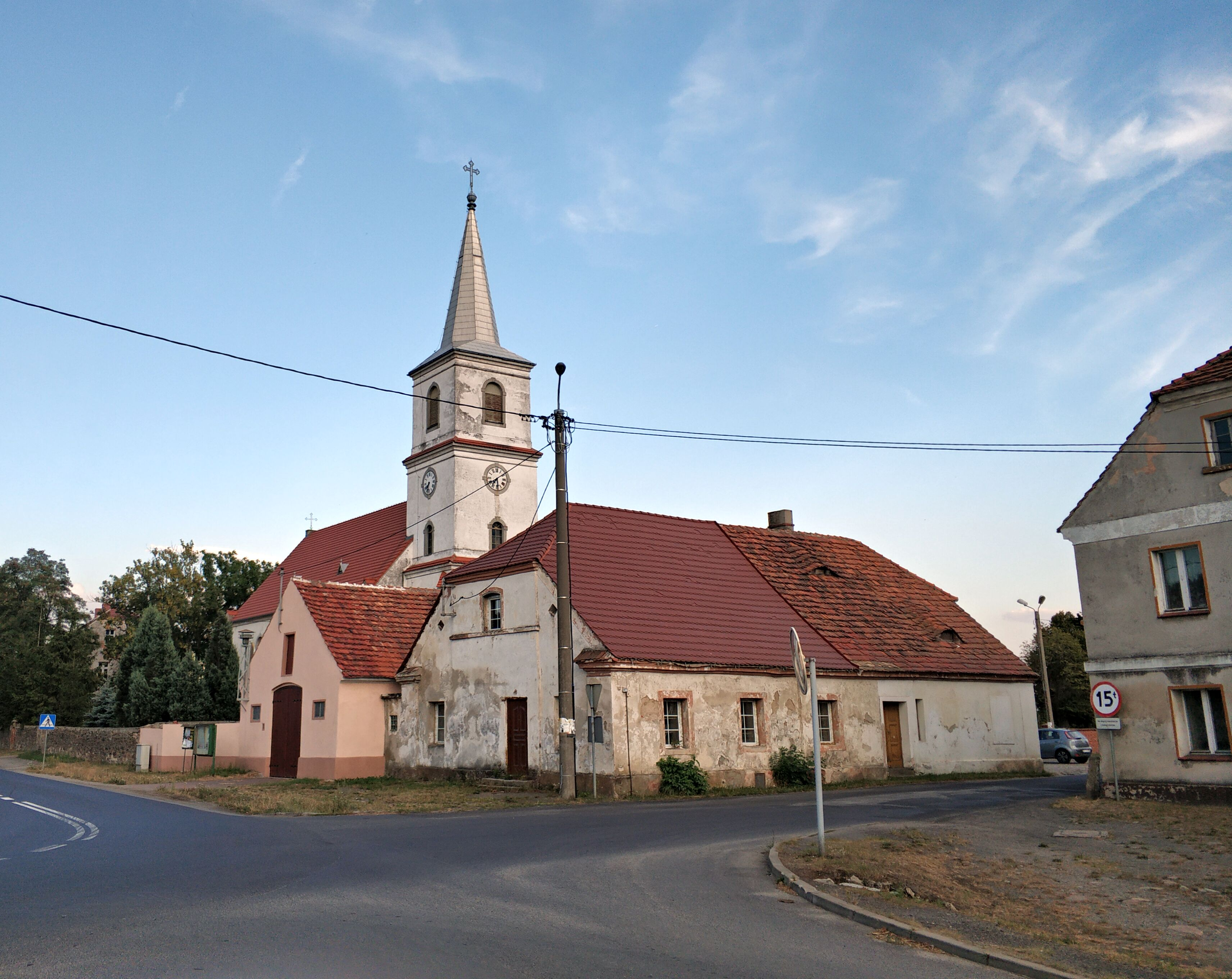
- Church of Saint Archangel Michael

- Location within Poland
- Coordinates: 51°5′N 16°35′E
- Country: Poland
- Voivodeship: Lower Silesian
- County: Środa
- Gmina: Kostomłoty

Population
  - Total: 500

Piersno (Polish pronunciation: [ˈpjɛrsnɔ]) is a village in the administrative district of Gmina Kostomłoty, within Środa County, Lower Silesian Voivodeship, in south-western Poland.

== See also ==
- Średzka Woda
