= Michałów, Gmina Środa Śląska =

Michałów
- Village
- Location within Poland
- Coordinates: 51°06′26″N 16°32′14″E
- Country: Poland
- Voivodeship: Lower Silesian
- County: Środa
- Gmina: Środa Śląska
- Population: 110

Michałów [miˈxawuf] is a village in the administrative district of Gmina Środa Śląska, within Środa County, Lower Silesian Voivodeship, in south-western Poland.
