= Kobylniki, Gmina Środa Śląska =

Kobylniki
- Village
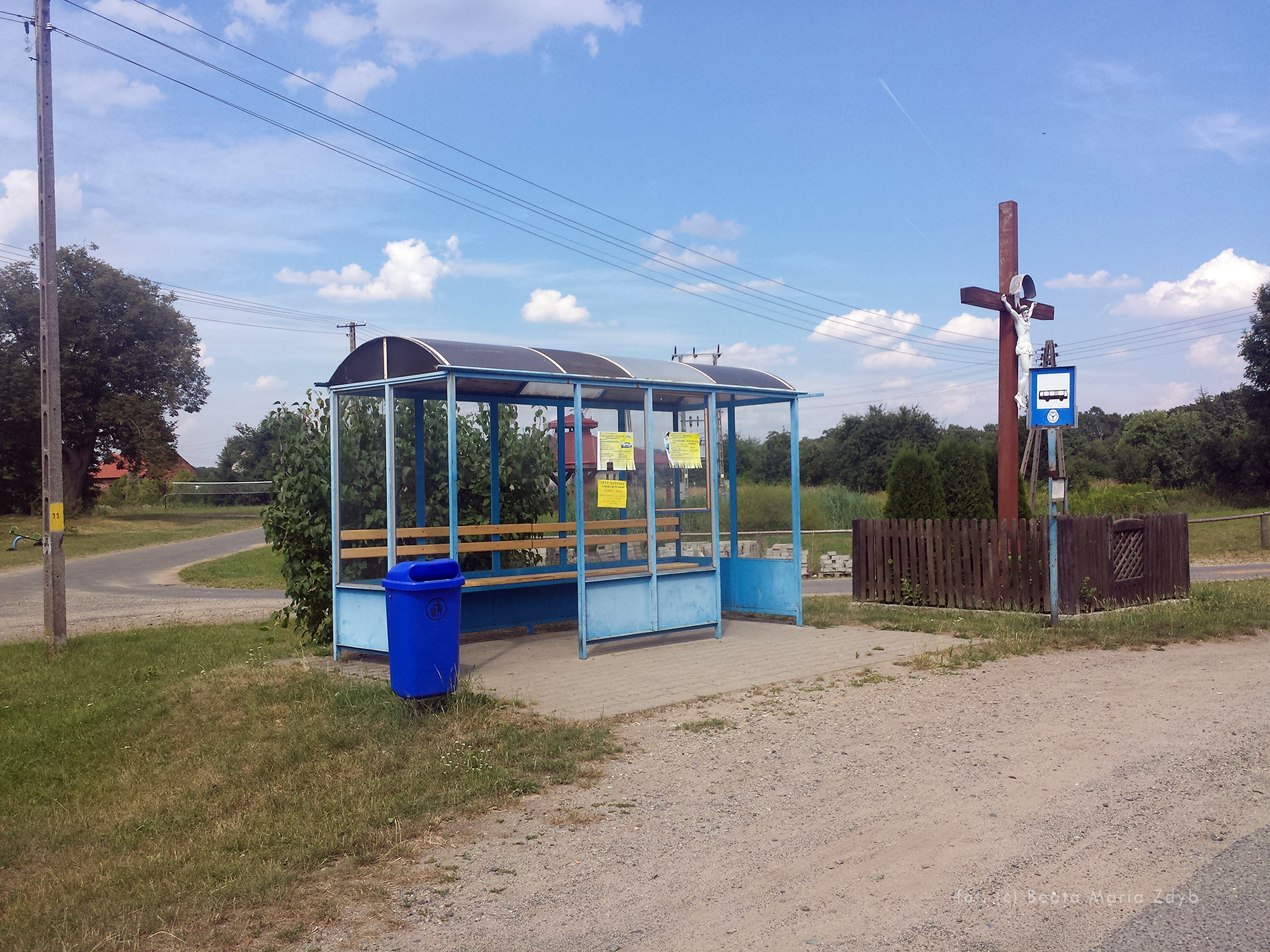

- Location within Poland
- Coordinates: 51°13′39″N 16°40′32″E
- Country: Poland
- Voivodeship: Lower Silesian
- County: Środa
- Gmina: Środa Śląska

Kobylniki [kɔbɨlˈniki] (German: Kobelnick) is a village in the administrative district of Gmina Środa Śląska, within Środa County, Lower Silesian Voivodeship, in south-western Poland.
