= Juszczyn, Lower Silesian Voivodeship =

Juszczyn
- Village
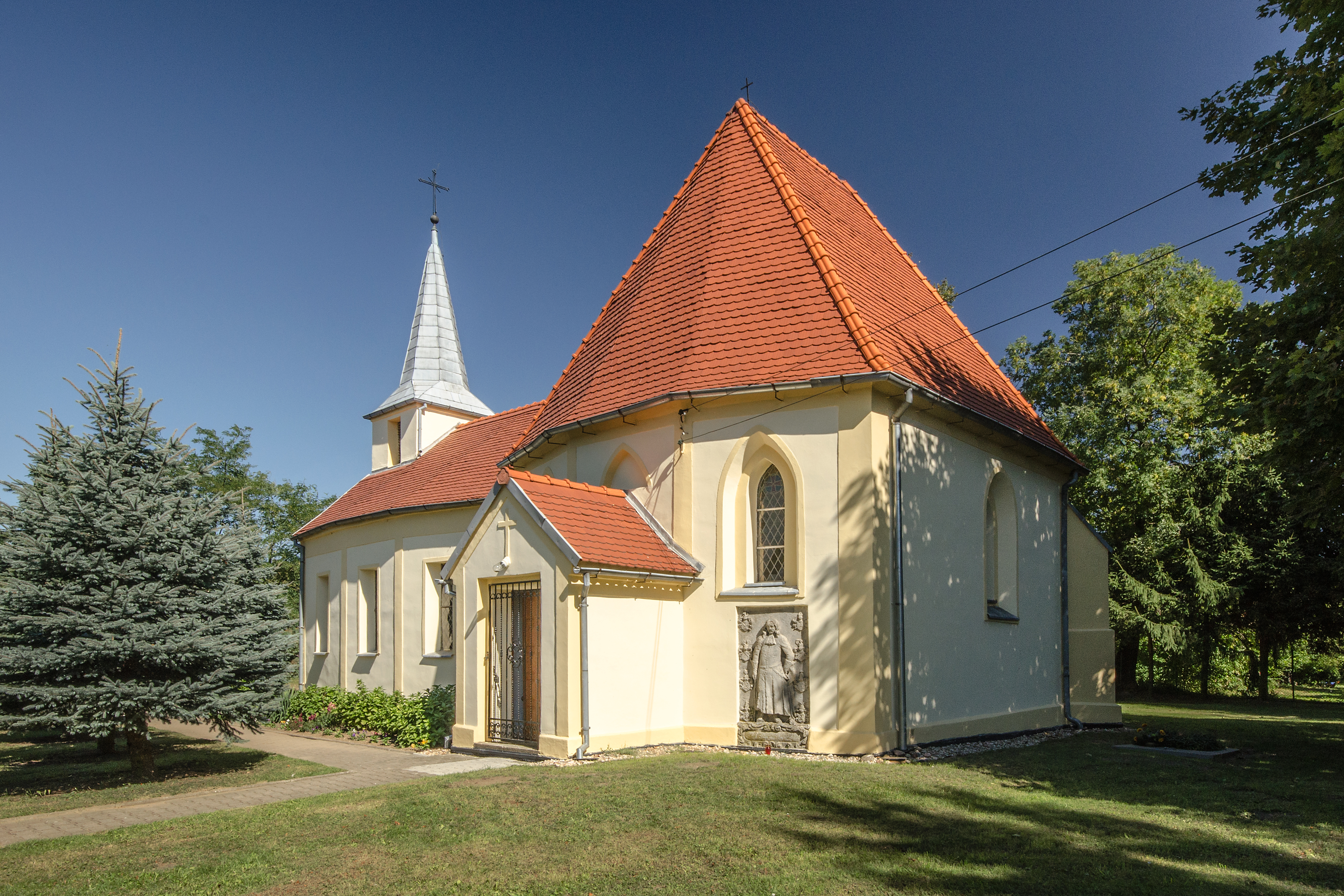
- Church of the Virgin Mary

- Location within Poland
- Coordinates: 51°09′17″N 16°40′38″E
- Country: Poland
- Voivodeship: Lower Silesian
- County: Środa
- Gmina: Środa Śląska

Juszczyn [ˈjuʂt͡ʂɨn] (German: Lampersdorf) is a village in the administrative district of Gmina Środa Śląska, within Środa County, Lower Silesian Voivodeship, in south-western Poland.
