= Gozdawa, Lower Silesian Voivodeship =

Gozdawa Gossendorf (German)
- Village
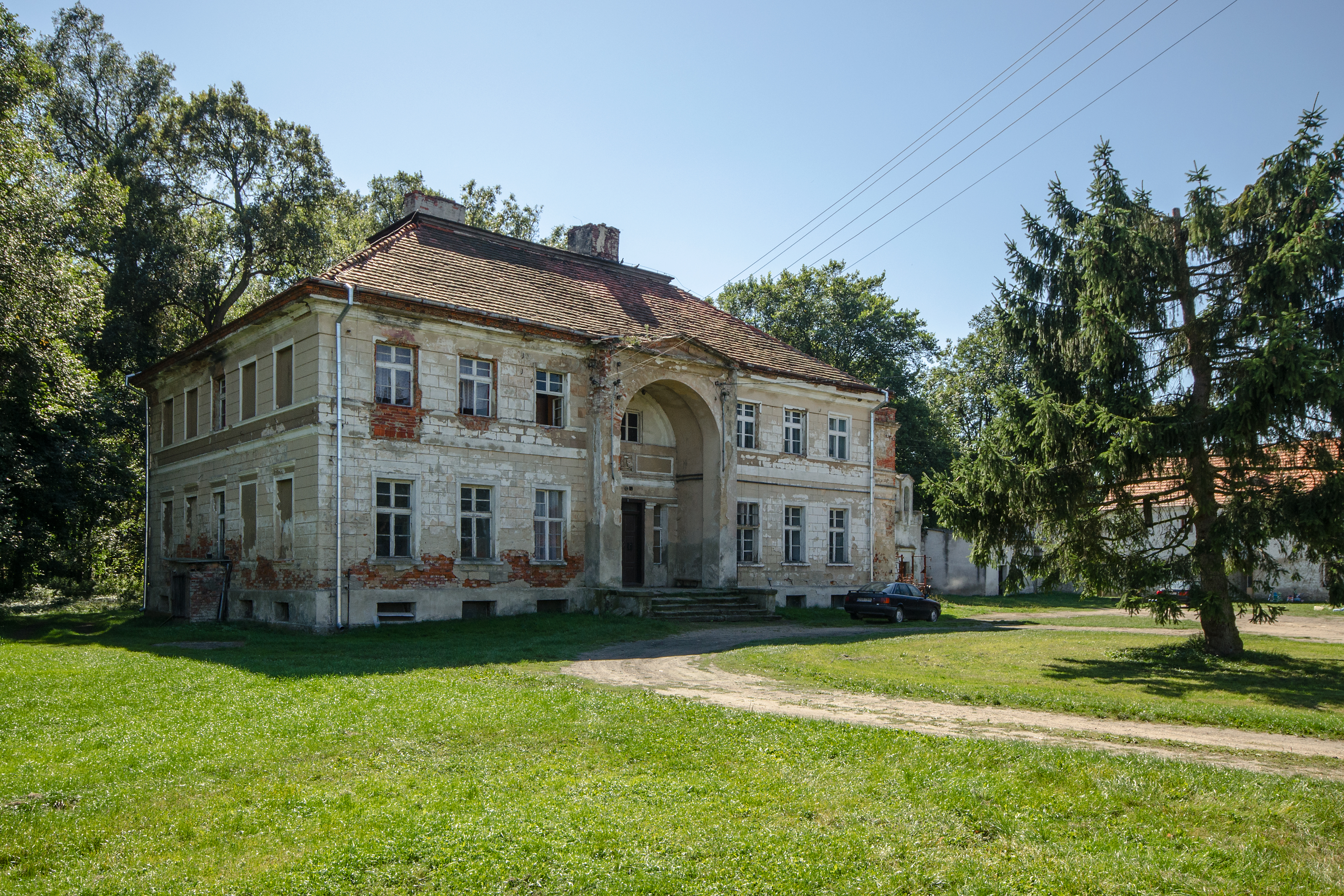
- Palace

- Location within Poland
- Coordinates: 51°06′43″N 16°39′22″E
- Country: Poland
- Voivodeship: Lower Silesian
- County: Środa
- Gmina: Środa Śląska

Gozdawa [ɡɔzˈdava] (German: Gossendorf) is a village in the administrative district of Gmina Środa Śląska, within Środa County, Lower Silesian Voivodeship, in south-western Poland.
