= Gmina Środa Śląska =

Gmina Środa Śląska Środa Śląska Commune
- Gmina
- Flag Coat of arms
- Interactive map of Gmina Środa Śląska
- Coordinates (Środa Śląska): 51°09′N 16°35′E
- Country: Poland
- Voivodeship: Lower Silesian
- County: Środa
- Seat: Środa Śląska
- Sołectwos: Brodno, Bukówek, Cesarzowice, Chwalimierz, Ciechów, Gozdawa, Jastrzębce, Jugowiec, Juszczyn, Kobylniki, Komorniki, Kryniczno, Kulin, Lipnica, Michałów, Ogrodnica, Pęczków, Proszków, Przedmoście, Rakoszyce, Rzeczyca, Słup, Święte, Szczepanów, Wojczyce, Wrocisławice, Zakrzów

Area
  - Total: 214.93 km^{2} (82.98 sq mi)

Population (2019-06-30)
  - Total: 19,862
  - Density: 92.411/km^{2} (239.34/sq mi)
  - Urban: 9,516
  - Rural: 10,346
- Website: http://srodaslaska.pl/

Gmina Środa Śląska is an urban-rural gmina (administrative district) in Środa County, Lower Silesian Voivodeship, in south-western Poland. Its seat is the town of Środa Śląska, which lies approximately 32 kilometres (20 mi) west of the regional capital Wrocław. It is part of the Wrocław metropolitan area.

The gmina covers an area of 214.93 square kilometres (83.0 sq mi), and as of 2006, its total population was 19,076, of which 8,800 lived in Środa Śląska and 10,276 in the rural part of the gmina.

== Neighbouring gminas ==
Gmina Środa Śląska is bordered by the gminas of Brzeg Dolny, Kostomłoty, Malczyce, Miękinia, Udanin, Wądroże Wielkie and Wołów.

== Villages ==
Apart from the town of Środa Śląska, the gmina contains the villages of Brodno, Bukówek, Cesarzowice, Chwalimierz, Ciechów, Gozdawa, Jastrzębce, Jugowiec, Juszczyn, Kobylniki, Komorniki, Kryniczno, Kulin, Lipnica, Michałów, Ogrodnica, Pęczków, Proszków, Przedmoście, Rakoszyce, Rzeczyca, Słup, Święte, Szczepanów, Wojczyce, Wrocisławice and Zakrzów.

== Twin towns – sister cities ==
Gmina Środa Śląska is twinned with:

- Kamianka-Buzka, Ukraine
- Saterland, Germany
- Štěpánov, Czech Republic
