= Lipnica, Gmina Środa Śląska =

Lipnica
- Village
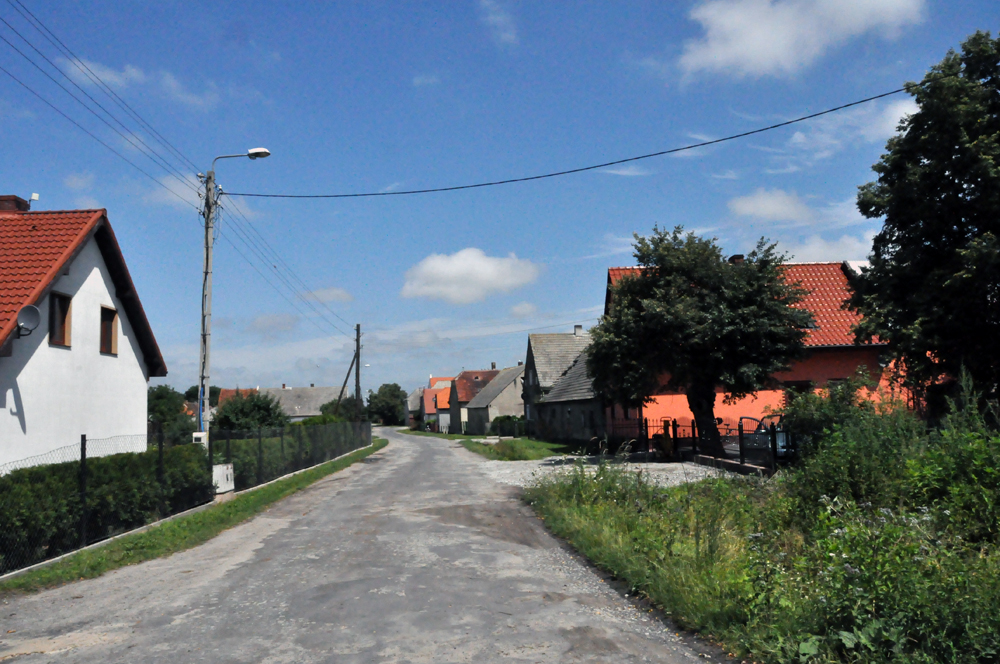
- Road in the village

- Location within Poland
- Coordinates: 51°12′02″N 16°33′51″E
- Country: Poland
- Voivodeship: Lower Silesian
- County: Środa
- Gmina: Środa Śląska

Lipnica (Polish pronunciation: [lipˈɲit͡sa]) is a village in the administrative district of Gmina Środa Śląska, within Środa County, Lower Silesian Voivodeship, in south-western Poland.
