= Ogrodnica =

- Village
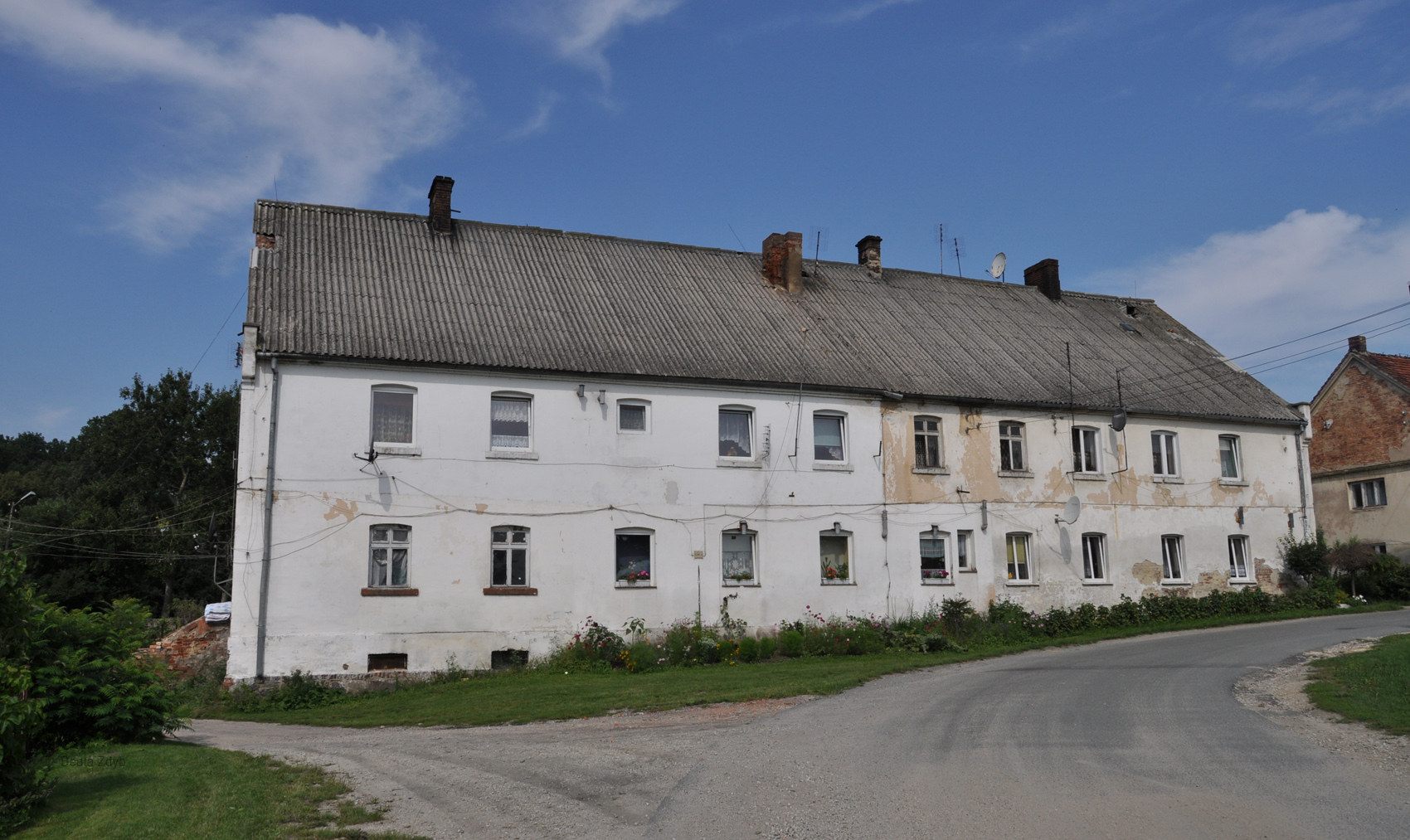
- Manor in Orgodnica

- Location within Poland
- Coordinates: 51°08′54″N 16°33′24″E
- Country: Poland
- Voivodeship: Lower Silesian
- County: Środa
- Gmina: Środa Śląska

Ogrodnica [ɔɡrɔdˈnit͡sa] is a village in the administrative district of Gmina Środa Śląska, within Środa County, Lower Silesian Voivodeship, in south-western Poland.
