= Brodno =

- Village
- Location within Poland
- Coordinates: 51°13′41″N 16°35′36″E
- Country: Poland
- Voivodeship: Lower Silesian
- County: Środa
- Gmina: Środa Śląska
- Population (approx.): 300

Brodno [ˈbrɔdnɔ] (German: Breitenau) is a village in the administrative district of Gmina Środa Śląska, within Środa County, Lower Silesian Voivodeship, in south-western Poland.
