= Pęczków =

- Village
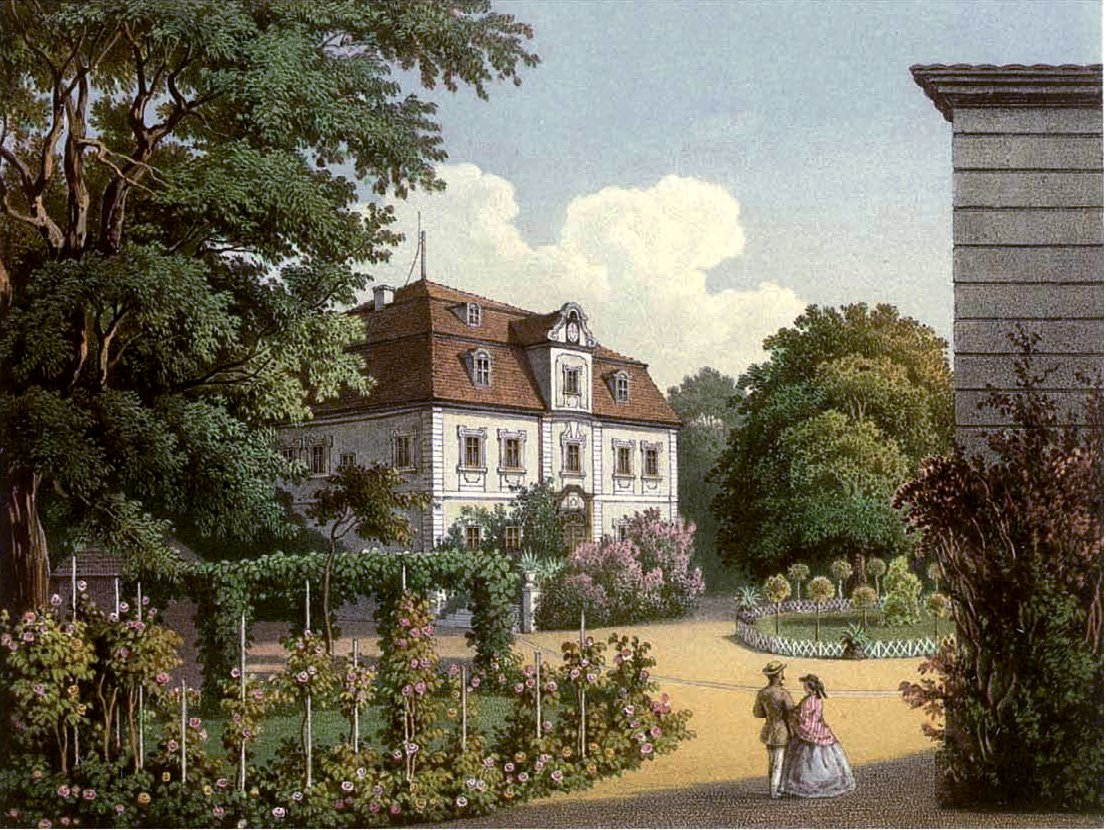

- Location within Poland
- Coordinates: 51°07′05″N 16°28′37″E
- Country: Poland
- Voivodeship: Lower Silesian
- County: Środa
- Gmina: Środa Śląska

Pęczków [ˈpɛnt͡ʂkuf] is a village in the administrative district of Gmina Środa Śląska, within Środa County, Lower Silesian Voivodeship, in south-western Poland.
