= Wojczyce =

- Village
- Location within Poland
- Coordinates: 51°08′23″N 16°41′17″E
- Country: Poland
- Voivodeship: Lower Silesian
- County: Środa
- Gmina: Środa Śląska
- Time zone: UTC+1 (CET)
  - Summer (DST): UTC+2 (CEST)
- Vehicle registration: DSR

Wojczyce [vɔi̯ˈt͡ʂɨt͡sɛ] is a village in the administrative district of Gmina Środa Śląska, within Środa County, Lower Silesian Voivodeship, in south-western Poland.

== History ==
The region formed part of Poland since the establishment of the state in the 10th century. In the 18th century it was annexed by Prussia, and from 1871 to 1945 it also formed part of Germany. During World War II, a German forced labour subcamp of the prison in Jawor was operated in the village. After the defeat of Nazi Germany in the war in 1945, it became again part of Poland.

== Notable residents ==
Clara Immerwahr (1870–1915), German chemist
