= Bukówek =

- Village
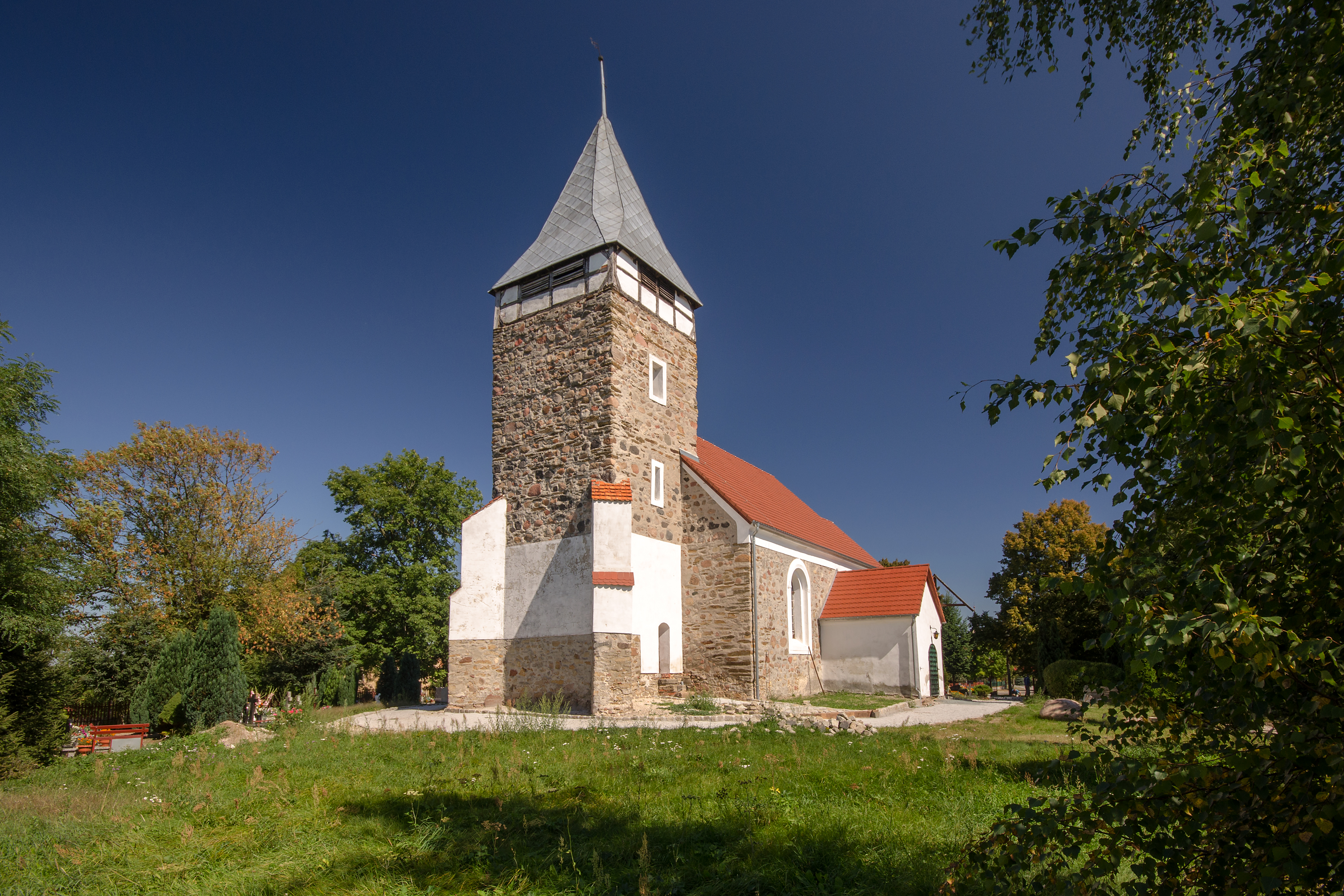
- Catholic church

- Location within Poland
- Coordinates: 51°07′38″N 16°31′35″E
- Country: Poland
- Voivodeship: Lower Silesian
- County: Środa
- Gmina: Środa Śląska
- Population: 280

Bukówek [buˈkuvɛk] (German: Buchwald) is a village in the administrative district of Gmina Środa Śląska, within Środa County, Lower Silesian Voivodeship, in south-western Poland.
