= Daniel Immerwahr =

American historian (born 1980)

Academic background
- Education: Columbia University (BA); King's College, Cambridge (BA); University of California, Berkeley (PhD)

Academic work
- Discipline: History
- Institutions: Northwestern University

Daniel Immerwahr (born May 21, 1980) is an American historian and author. He is the Bergen Evans Professor in the Humanities at the Weinberg College of Arts & Sciences at Northwestern University.

His first book, Thinking Small, was published in 2015 and won the Merle Curti Award. His second book, How to Hide an Empire (2019), was a national bestseller, one of the New York Times critics' top books of the year, and winner of the Robert H. Ferrell Prize.

== Early life and education ==
Immerwahr grew up in Swarthmore, Pennsylvania. He is Jewish and is first cousin twice removed of the pioneering chemist Clara Immerwahr (1870–1915), first wife of Nobel Prize winner Fritz Haber. He is a son of Paula Sepinuck, a theater writer and director, and John Immerwahr, Professor Emeritus of Philosophy at Villanova University and emeritus trustee of the Wenner-Gren Foundation. He received his undergraduate degree from Columbia University in 2002, before obtaining a second undergraduate degree at King's College, Cambridge in 2004 as a Marshall Scholar. In 2011, Immerwahr received a Ph.D. in history from the University of California, Berkeley. From 2011 to 2012, he was a postdoctoral research fellow at Columbia University's Committee on Global Thought.

== Career ==
He is a professor of history at Northwestern University. Since 2020, Immerwahr is a contributing writer at The New Yorker. He has also written for n+1, Slate, Jacobin, and Dissent. His work has largely focused on American history.

== Books ==
- Thinking Small: The United States and the Lure of Community Development, Cambridge, Mass., Harvard University Press, 2015, ISBN 978-0-6742-8994-9, OCLC 949790596
- How to Hide an Empire: A History of the Greater United States, New York, Farrar, Straus and Giroux, 2019, ISBN 978-0-3741-7214-5, OCLC 1088916388
  - Spanish: Cómo ocultar un imperio ISBN 9788412619836
  - Italian: L'impero nascosto: Breve storia dei Grandi Stati Uniti d'America
  - German: Das heimliche Imperium: Die USA als moderne Kolonialmacht ISBN 9783103972351

== Articles ==
- Daniel Immerwahr, "Everything in Hand: the C.I.A.'s covert ops have mattered – but not in the way that it hoped", The New Yorker, June 17, 2024, pp. 53–57. "After the Second World War, the United States set out to direct politics on a global scale. This mission was unpopular, hence the cloak-and-dagger secrecy, and difficult, hence the regular fiascoes. [...] 'We knew nothing,' the onetime C.I.A. director Richard Helms remembered. [...] Ivy League professors were tasked with steering top students toward intelligence careers. [Particularly] literature students. [...] Something about sorting through ambiguity, paradox, and hidden meanings equipped students for espionage." (p. 54.) "[In the 1950s] hundreds of the CIA's foreign agents were sent to their deaths in [Albania,] Russia, Poland, Romania, Ukraine, and the Baltic states... [I]ntelligence officers [then] shifted their attention to [...] the Third World, today more often called the Global South. [But t]he U.S. lacked the generations-deep, place-based colonial knowledge that Britain and France had." (p. 55.) "The Lawrencian fantasy was that U.S. agents would embed themselves in foreign lands. In reality [...] ambitious foreigners infiltrat[ed] the United States. [A long] list of world leaders [...] trained Stateside [...[. [...] The C.I.A. interfered constantly in foreign politics, but its typical mode wasn't micromanaging; it was subcontracting. [...] For all the heady talk of promoting democracy, more than two-thirds of U.S. covert interventions during the Cold War were in support of authoritarian regimes..." (p. 56.) "As the [1990s] wore on, U.S. leaders grew increasingly alarmed about [Iraq dictator] Saddam's continued military capacities. But intelligence was wanting. [...] The combination of scant knowledge and overweening concern created demand, and [Ahmad] Chalabi arrange[d] the supply. He promoted sources who [falsely] claimed that Saddam was stockpiling chemical and biological weapons and had kept working toward nuclear ones. [...] In the end, the C.I.A. has the power to break things, but not the skill to build them. [...] The heart of the issue is the United States' determination to control global affairs." (p. 57.)
