= Przedmoście, Gmina Środa Śląska =

Przedmoście
- Village
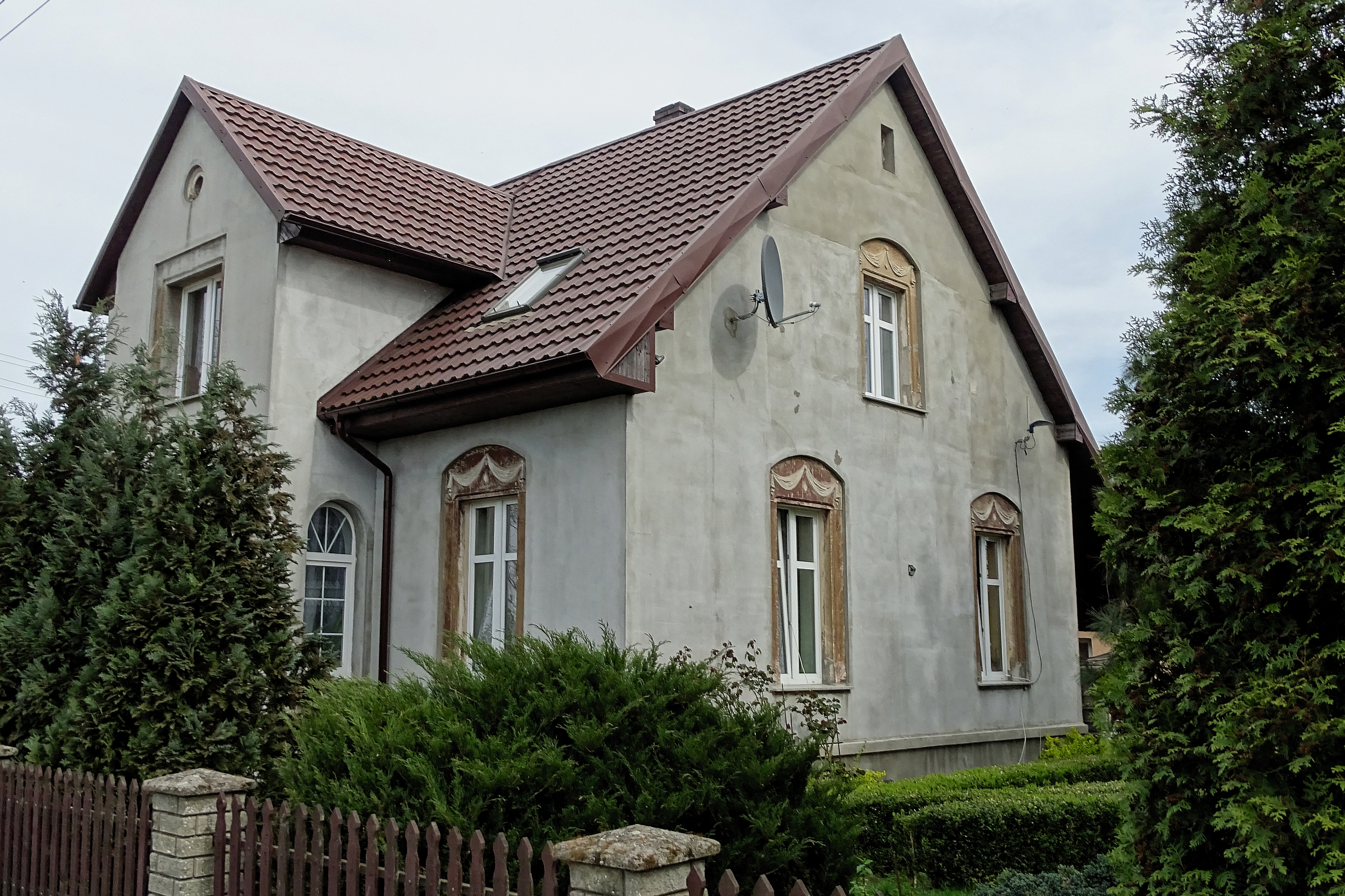

- Location within Poland
- Coordinates: 51°11′24″N 16°40′3″E
- Country: Poland
- Voivodeship: Lower Silesian
- County: Środa Śląska
- Gmina: Środa
- Population (approx.): 330

Przedmoście [pʂɛdˈmɔɕt͡ɕɛ] is a village in the administrative district of Gmina Środa Śląska, within Środa County, Lower Silesian Voivodeship, in south-western Poland.
