= Jastrzębce, Lower Silesian Voivodeship =

Jastrzębce
- Village
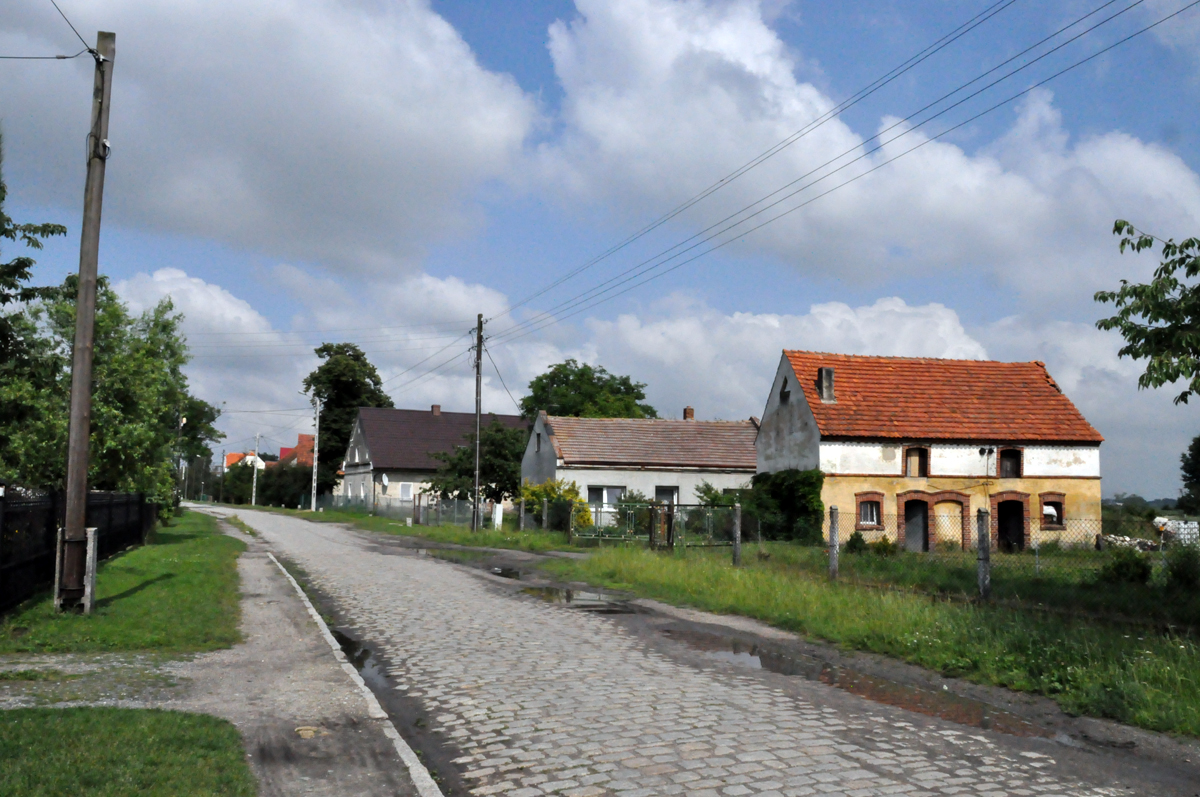

- Location within Poland
- Coordinates: 51°11′07″N 16°33′18″E
- Country: Poland
- Voivodeship: Lower Silesian
- County: Środa
- Gmina: Środa Śląska
- Population (approx.): 380

Jastrzębce [jasˈtʂɛmpt͡sɛ] (German: Falkenhain) is a village in the administrative district of Gmina Środa Śląska, within Środa County, Lower Silesian Voivodeship, in south-western Poland.
