= Proszków =

- Village
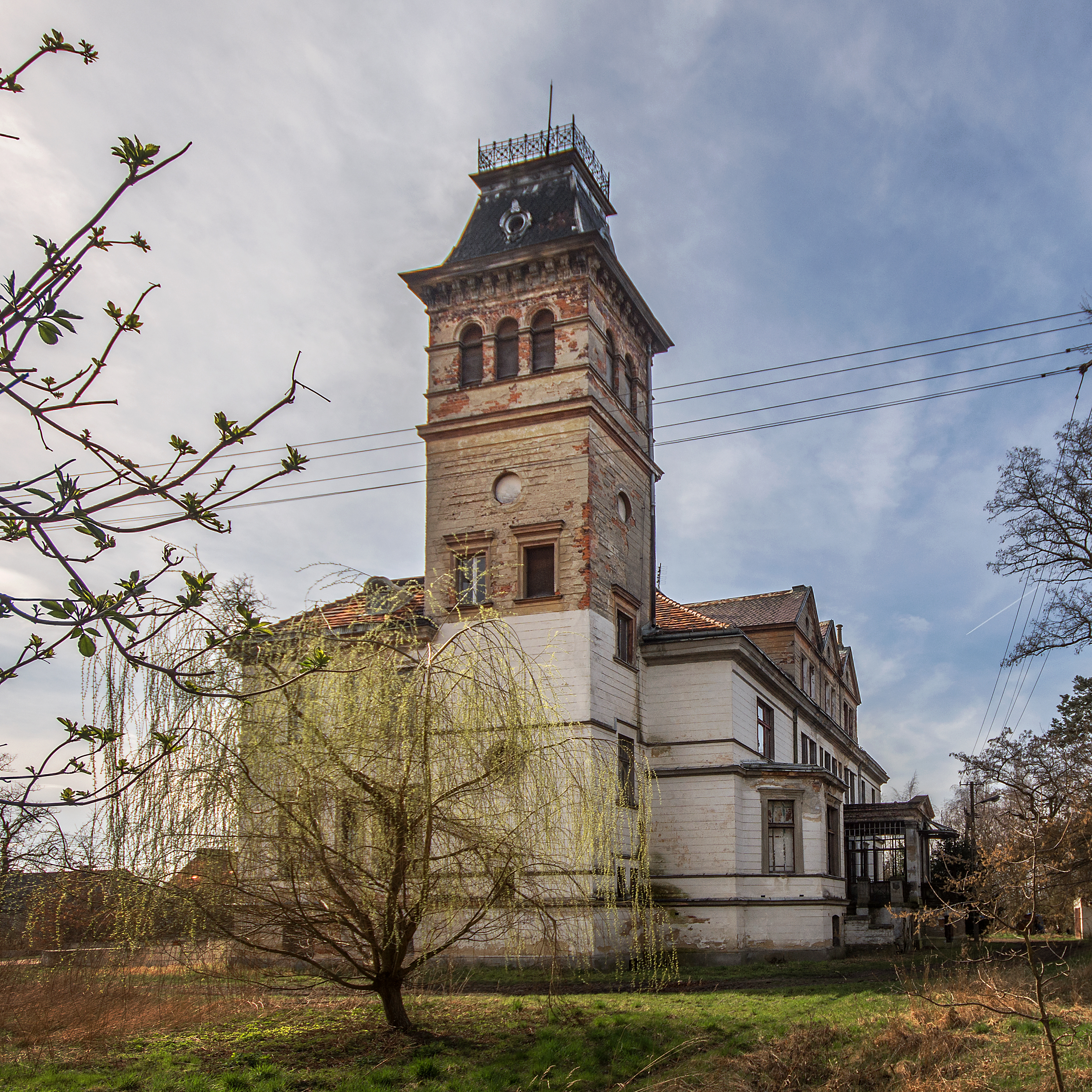
- Palace in Proszków

- Location within Poland
- Coordinates: 51°09′52″N 16°31′58″E
- Country: Poland
- Voivodeship: Lower Silesian
- County: Środa
- Gmina: Środa Śląska

Population
  - Total: 827
- Time zone: UTC+1 (CET)
  - Summer (DST): UTC+2 (CEST)
- Vehicle registration: DSR

Proszków [ˈprɔʂkuf] is a village in the administrative district of Gmina Środa Śląska, within Środa County, Lower Silesian Voivodeship, in south-western Poland.
