= Slup, Czech Republic =

Slup
- Municipality
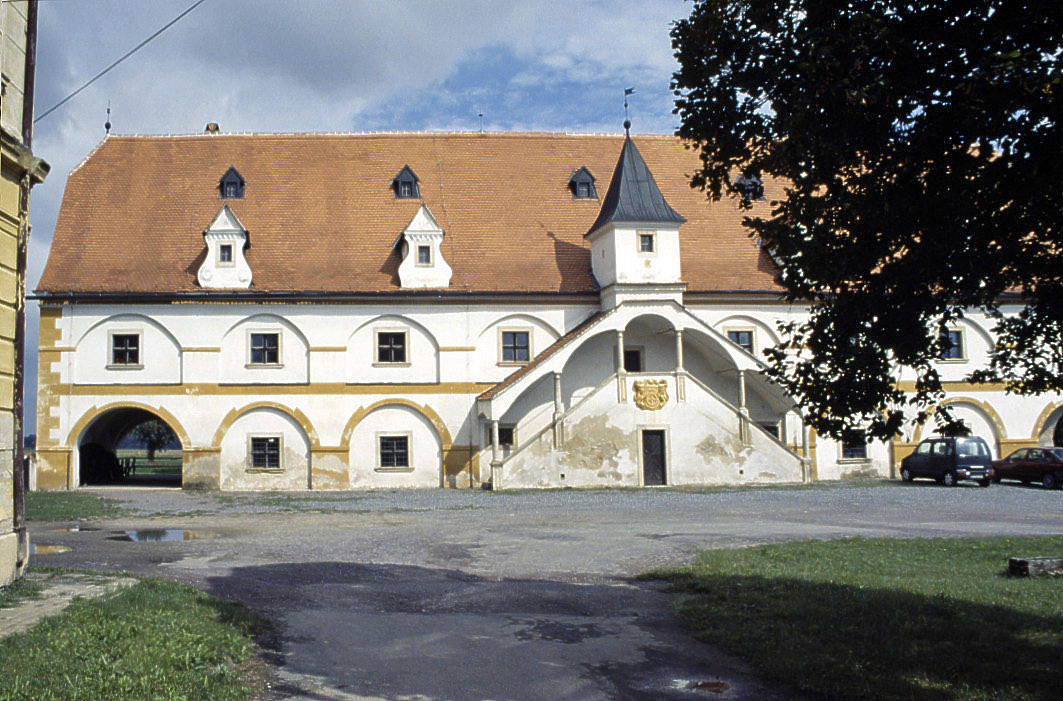
- Watermill, a national cultural monument

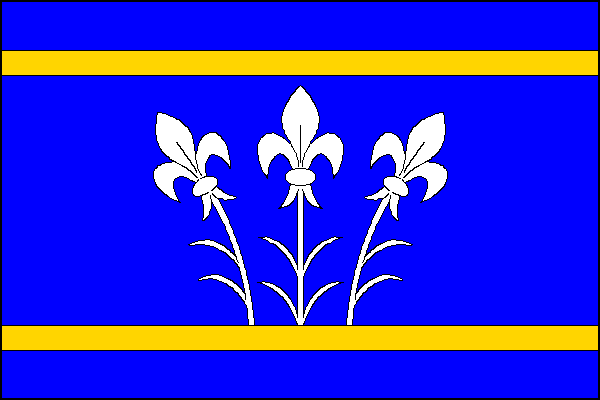
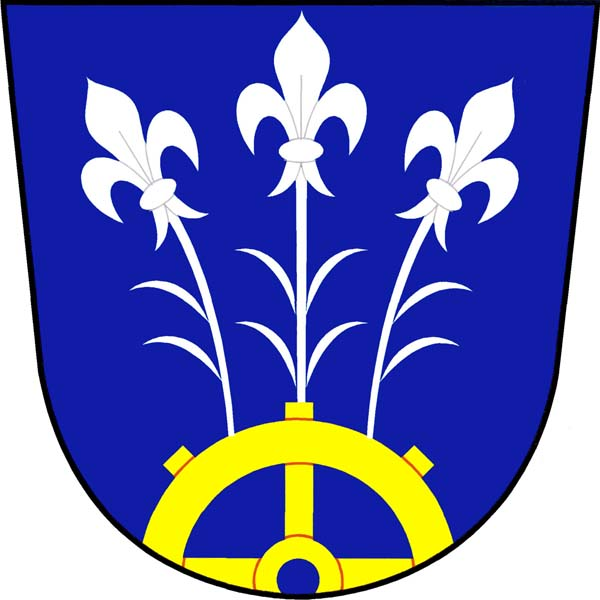
- Flag Coat of arms

- Location in the Czech Republic
- Coordinates: 48°46′54″N 16°11′57″E
- Country: Czech Republic
- Region: South Moravian
- District: Znojmo
- First mentioned: 1228

Area
  - Total: 15.72 km^{2} (6.07 sq mi)
- Elevation: 191 m (627 ft)

Population (2026-01-01)
  - Total: 538
  - Density: 34.2/km^{2} (88.6/sq mi)
- Time zone: UTC+1 (CET)
  - Summer (DST): UTC+2 (CEST)
- Postal code: 671 28
- Website: www.slup.cz

Slup (until 1949 Čule; German: Zulb) is a municipality and village in Znojmo District in the South Moravian Region of the Czech Republic. It has about 500 inhabitants.

Slup lies approximately 15 kilometres (9 mi) south-east of Znojmo, 58 km (36 mi) south-west of Brno, and 195 km (121 mi) south-east of Prague.

== Administrative division ==
Slup consists of two municipal parts (in brackets population according to the 2021 census):

- Slup (419)
- Oleksovičky (75)

== Demographics ==
Historical population
Year	Pop.	±%
1869	1,299	—
1880	1,483	+14.2%
1890	1,592	+7.3%
1900	1,646	+3.4%
1910	1,725	+4.8%
1921	1,700	−1.4%
1930	1,693	−0.4%
1950	697	−58.8%
1961	648	−7.0%
1970	564	−13.0%
1980	534	−5.3%
1991	437	−18.2%
2001	408	−6.6%
2011	438	+7.4%
2021	494	+12.8%
Source: Censuses
