= Cesarzowice, Gmina Środa Śląska =

Cesarzowice
- Village
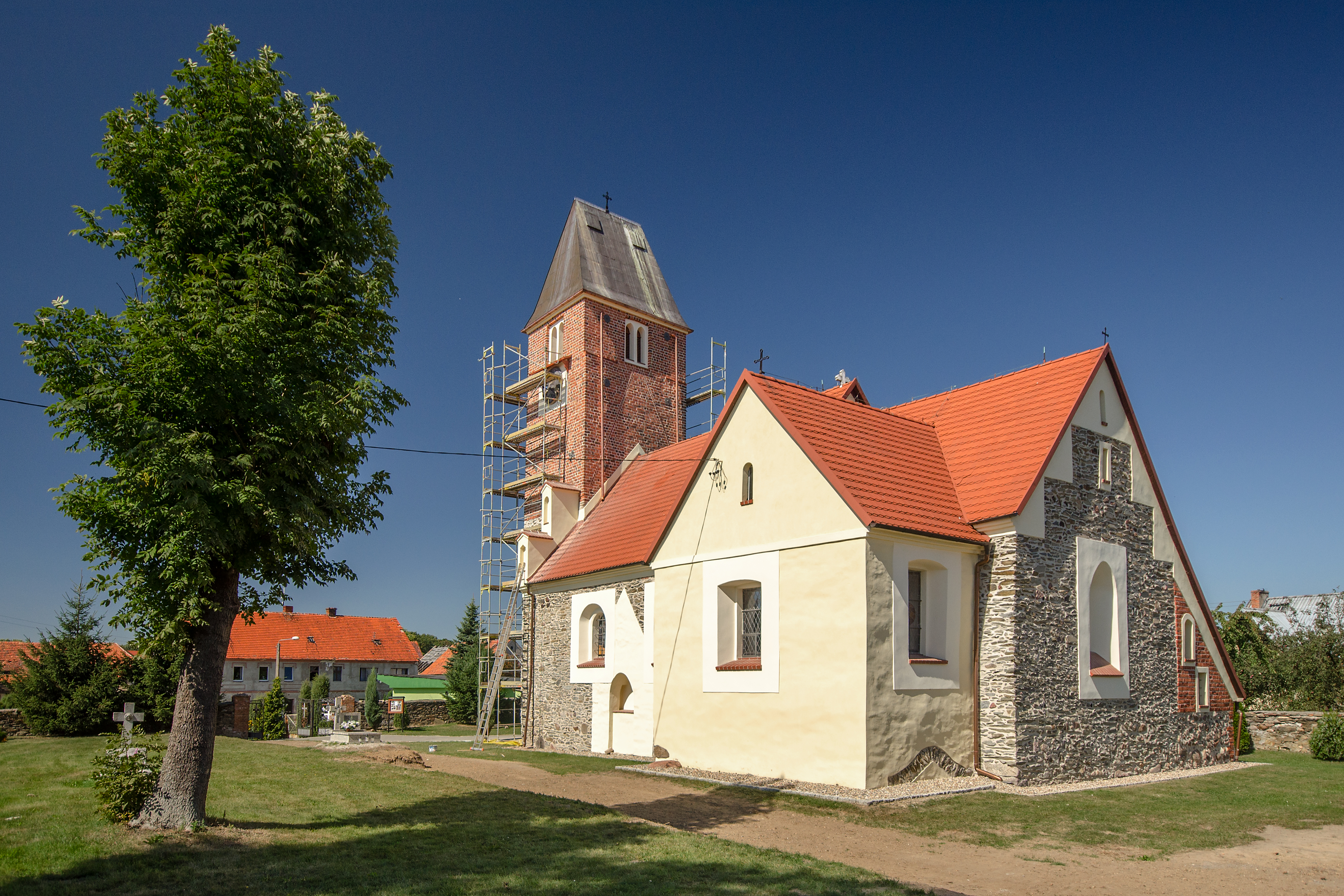
- Church of Saint Martin

- Location within Poland
- Coordinates: 51°06′20″N 16°33′57″E
- Country: Poland
- Voivodeship: Lower Silesian
- County: Środa
- Gmina: Środa Śląska

Cesarzowice [t͡sɛsaʐɔˈvit͡sɛ] (German: Zieserwitz) is a village in the administrative district of Gmina Środa Śląska, within Środa County, Lower Silesian Voivodeship, in south-western Poland.
