= Słup, Gmina Środa Śląska =

Słup
- Village
- Location within Poland
- Coordinates: 51°14′08″N 16°38′53″E
- Country: Poland
- Voivodeship: Lower Silesian
- County: Środa
- Gmina: Środa Śląska

Słup [swup] is a village in the administrative district of Gmina Środa Śląska, within Środa County, Lower Silesian Voivodeship, in south-western Poland.
