= Clara Immerwahr =

German chemist (1870–1915)

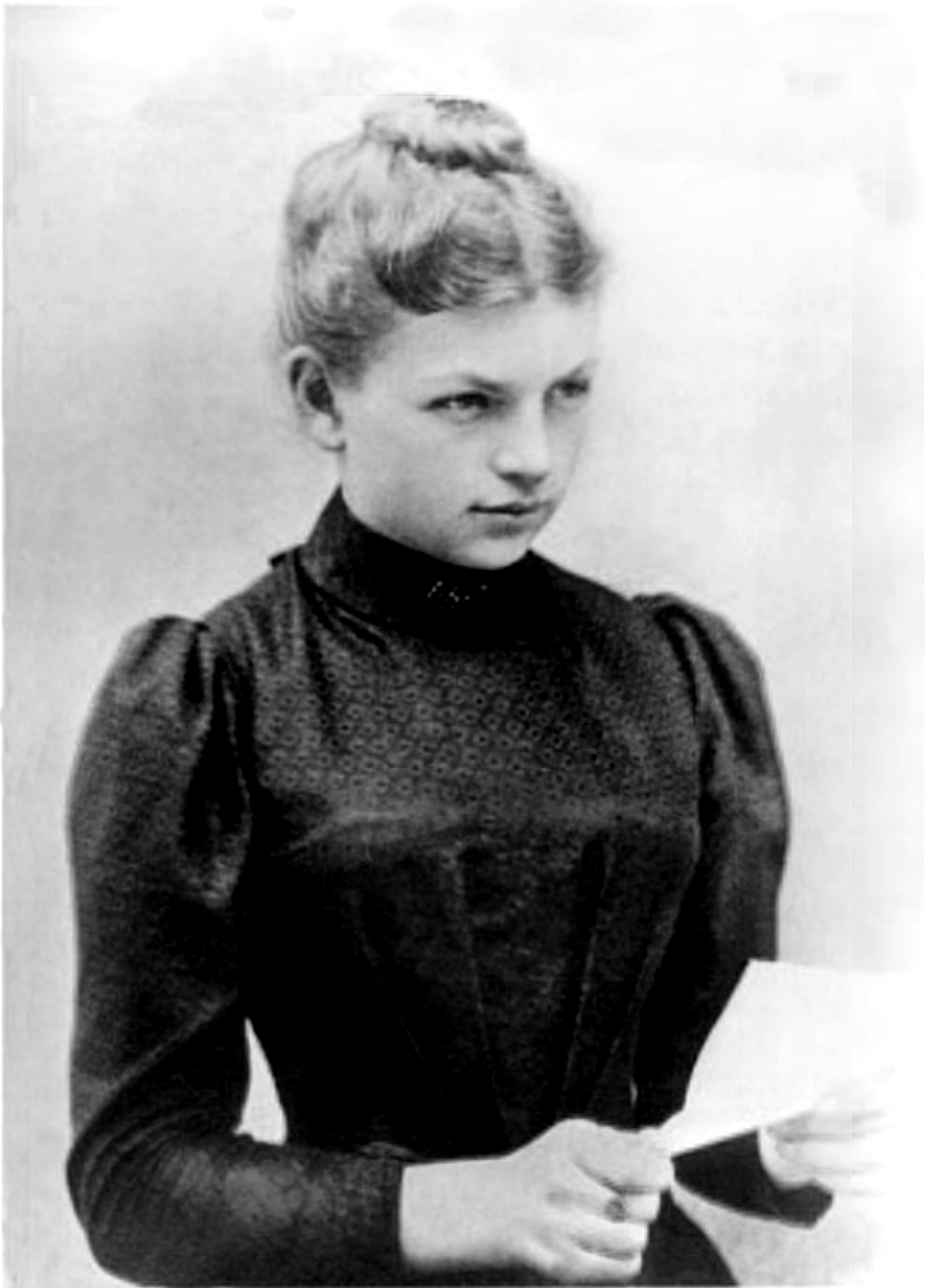
- Immerwahr
- Born: Clara Helene Immerwahr; 21 June 1870; Polkendorf near Breslau, Silesia Province, Kingdom of Prussia
- Died: 2 May 1915 (aged 44); Berlin-Dahlem, Kingdom of Prussia, German Empire
- Cause of death: Suicide by gunshot
- Education: University of Breslau
- Spouse: Fritz Haber
- Children: 1
- Scientific career
- Fields: Chemistry
- Doctoral advisor: Richard Abegg

Clara Helene Immerwahr (German pronunciation: [ˈklaːʁa heˈleːnə ˈʔɪmɐvaːɐ̯]; 21 June 1870 – 2 May 1915) was a German chemist. She was the first German woman to be awarded a doctorate in chemistry from the University of Breslau, and is credited with being a pacifist as well as a "heroine of the women's rights movement". From 1901 until her death from suicide in 1915, she was married to the eventual Nobel Prize-winning chemist Fritz Haber.

== Early life and education ==
Immerwahr was born on the Polkendorff Farm in Breslau (today Wojczyce, Poland), the youngest daughter of Jewish parents, chemist Philipp Immerwahr and his wife, Anna (née Krohn). She grew up on the farm with her three older siblings, Elli, Rose, and Paul. In 1890, her mother died of cancer. While Elli and her husband Siegfried stayed at the farm, Clara moved with her father to Breslau.

Immerwahr studied at the University of Breslau, attaining her degree and a PhD in chemistry under Richard Abegg in 1900, after 8 semesters of study (two more than required for male doctoral candidates). Her dissertation was entitled Beiträge zur Löslichkeitsbestimmung schwerlöslicher Salze des Quecksilbers, Kupfers, Bleis, Cadmiums und Zinks (Contributions to the Solubility of Slightly Soluble Salts of Mercury, Copper, Lead, Cadmium, and Zinc). She was the first woman Ph.D. at the University of Breslau and received the designation magna cum laude. Her thesis defense was held in the main hall of the university and was attended by many young women of the city, interested in seeing "Unser erster weiblicher Doktor" ("our first female doctor"). A few months after obtaining her degree, she gave a public lecture entitled "Chemistry and Physics in the Household."

== Marriage and work ==
Immerwahr married Fritz Haber in August 1901, four years after she had converted to Christianity in 1897. The two had met years earlier at a dance lesson and started a brief romance, but Immerwahr turned down his marriage proposal at the time because she wanted to remain financially independent.

Due to societal expectations that a married woman's place was in the home, her ability to conduct research was limited. She instead contributed to her husband's work with minimal recognition, translating some of his papers into English. On 1 June 1902 she gave birth to Hermann Haber (1902–1946), the only child of that marriage.

Confiding in Abegg, Immerwahr expressed her deep dissatisfaction with this subservient role:

It has always been my attitude that a life has only been worth living if one has made full use of all one's abilities and tried to live out every kind of experience human life has to offer. It was under that impulse, among other things, that I decided to get married at that time... The life I got from it was very brief...and the main reasons for that was Fritz's oppressive way of putting himself first in our home and marriage, so that a less ruthlessly self-assertive personality was simply destroyed.

Haber continually neglected his wife and child, leaving for a tour of scientific facilities in the US when his son was only a few months old. When he was in the country, he often spent lunch hours and evenings at work or with his colleagues rather than at home. In a 1915 letter to Setsuro Tamaru, a Japanese colleague of Haber's, Immerwahr expressed her disappointment that her husband worked "18 hours a day, almost always in Berlin (not in Dahlem!)"

During World War I, Fritz Haber became a staunch supporter of the German military effort and played an important role in the development of chemical weapons (particularly poison gases). His efforts would culminate in his supervision of the first successful deployment of a weapon of mass destruction in military history, in Flanders, Belgium, on 22 April 1915. Immerwahr reportedly spoke out against her husband's research as a "perversion of the ideals of science" and "a sign of barbarity, corrupting the very discipline which ought to bring new insights into life." Immerwahr was also a witness to the accidental death of one of her former college classmates, Otto Sackur, who was attempting to tame cacodyl chloride in Haber's lab as part of Haber's research into chemical weapons.

== Death ==
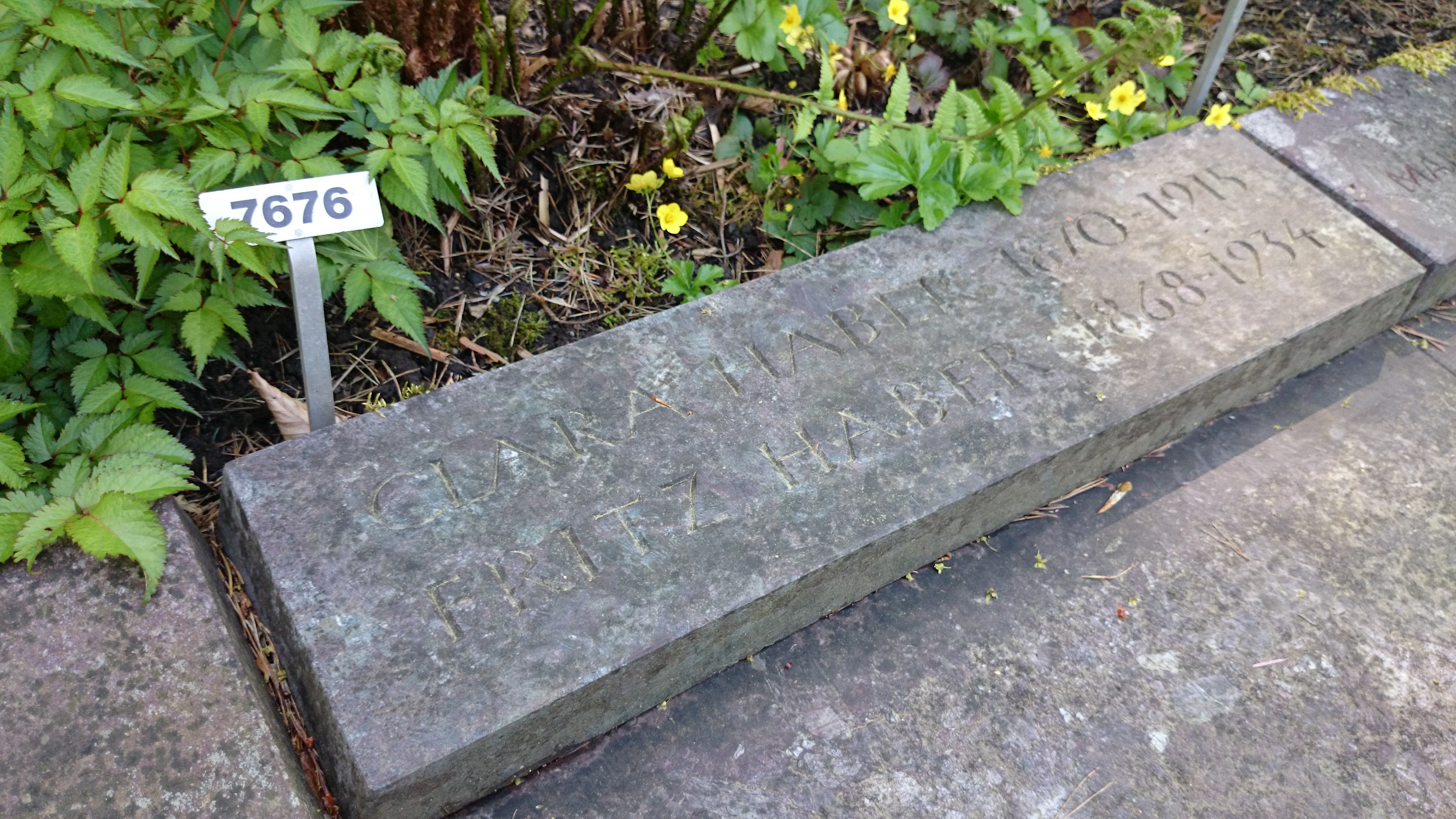
The grave of Fritz and Clara Haber, Hörnli graveyard, near Basel, Switzerland

Shortly after Haber's return from Belgium, Immerwahr shot herself in the chest using Haber's military pistol. On 2 May 1915, she died in her son's arms. The morning after her death, Haber left for the first gas attack against the Russians on the Eastern Front.

Her suicide remained largely unreported. Six days after her death, only the small local newspaper Grunewald-Zeitung reported that "the wife of Dr H. in Dahlem, who is currently on the front, has set an end to her life by shooting herself. The reasons for this act of the unhappy woman are unknown." The poorly documented circumstances of her death have resulted in considerable discussion and controversy as to her reasons, including that she opposed Haber's work in chemical warfare and her suicide was a response to him personally overseeing the first successful use of chlorine gas during the Second Battle of Ypres, resulting in over 67,000 casualties.

Immerwahr's ashes were moved from Dahlem to Basel and buried together with Haber's after his death in 1934. Subsequently, their son Hermann Haber emigrated to the United States, where he died of suicide in 1946.

== In drama, fiction and writing ==
A number of works have been inspired to explore Fritz and Clara's relationship. The short film Haber, written and directed by Daniel Ragussis, attempts to examine some of the issues in the couple's relationship. The Habers also feature prominently in the novel A Reunion of Ghosts by Judith Claire Mitchell, where their characters are named Lenz and Iris Alter. Works such as The Greater Good (2008), directed by Celia de Wolff and written by Justin Hopper, portray Clara as deeply affected by her husband's research on gas warfare. Their lives are portrayed in the American television series Genius. In 2014 the film Clara Immerwahr was released (directed by Harald Sicheritz). Clara and Fritz are also discussed, in brief account, in the book How to Hide an Empire: A History of the Greater United States by Daniel Immerwahr, when referencing the history of nitrogen's role in agriculture in American history.
