= Kryniczno, Gmina Środa Śląska =

Kryniczno
- Village
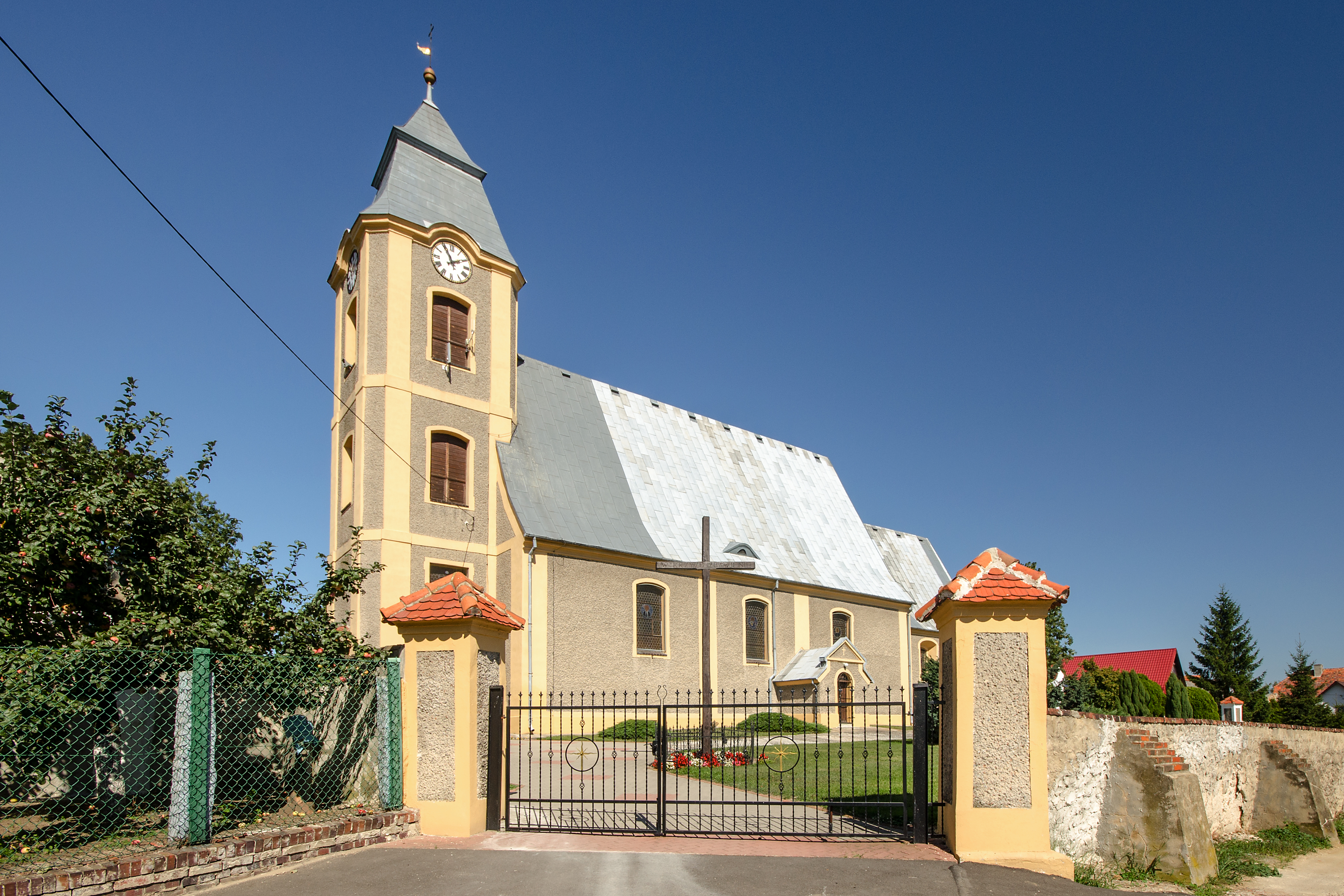
- Catholic church

- Location within Poland
- Coordinates: 51°8′N 16°40′E
- Country: Poland
- Voivodeship: Lower Silesian
- County: Środa
- Gmina: Środa Śląska

Kryniczno [krɨˈnit͡ʂnɔ] is a village in the administrative district of Gmina Środa Śląska, within Środa County, Lower Silesian Voivodeship, in south-western Poland.
