= Łuczyna =

- Village
- Location within Poland
- Coordinates: 51°18′N 17°17′E
- Country: Poland
- Voivodeship: Lower Silesian
- County: Oleśnica
- Gmina: Dobroszyce

Population
  - Total: 456
- Time zone: UTC+1 (CET)
  - Summer (DST): UTC+2 (CEST)
- Vehicle registration: DOL

Łuczyna [wuˈt͡ʂɨna] is a village in the administrative district of Gmina Dobroszyce, within Oleśnica County, Lower Silesian Voivodeship, in south-western Poland.

Łuczyna lies approximately 6 km (4 mi) north-west of Dobroszyce, 14 km (9 mi) north-west of Oleśnica, and 26 km (16 mi) north-east of the regional capital Wrocław. The village has a combined area of 1,846 hectares, and the population of 472 as of 2009.

== History ==
Łuczyna was founded as "Luzina" on 20 April 1251 by Bishop Tomasz I of Wrocław. In 1283, parish priest Smilo was mentioned there, along with the alternative spelling of the village name, "Lucina" (1283). Until 1810 the village was the possession of the Cistercian monastery of Trzebnica.

In 1845 the settlement got subdivided into the upper and lower part: Nieder and Ober Lutzine (in German). In the lower town there was a Protestant church, evangelical school, the palace, and two big farms: one within the village and one just outside it; as well as 77 private properties with 105 residential buildings; not to mention: two water mills, 10 linen weaving workshops, a bakery, a brickyard, a brewery and a distillery. At that time, among the 783 residents, there were 36 Protestants and 12 Catholics, including two gardening contractors, 20 artisans and 10 merchants of wood. In the upper town, there was also a brewery and a distillery, as well as 7 country estates featuring 10 family dwellings, housing 53 people in total.

Around 1847, resulting partially from the introduction of new administrative divisions, most land came into the possession of St. Bernard Hospital located in Wrocław, and the von Roeder family (1854) as well. The settlement remained split into upper and lower Lutzine until 1912, with St. Bernard Hospital owning most property in both parts. In 1937 Lutzine was sold to Georg von Roeder, with 1,218 hectares of land including 61.5 hectares of fields and meadows, and 1,156.5 hectares of the forest.

== Geography ==
Łuczyna came as a result of a merger of two towns, the boundaries of which run along the single road set in the north-west and south-east directions. The upper village is the site of the original settlement dating back to the 13th century. It outline is still visible in the center of town, featuring denser urban planning on both sides of a network of country roads with building plots of considerable size. All dwellings were surrounded by rectangular courtyards. In the center of the village is a prominent church, and a small cemetery to the south at some distance. To the north of it, along the road to Strzelce is the building of the local school.

The southern, lower part of the village featured more dispersed houses, and smaller size properties with less farm buildings. On its west side are the remains of three water mills. It also features a large roadside cemetery, on the south side, marking the boundary of the lower village.

== Points of interest ==
In Łuczyna there are no object entered in the register of monuments. There are a few different zones of conservation protection though. The entire area of the village is designated as zone "OW" for archaeological observation, due to burial mounds existing in the area and considered as valuable archaeological relics. Similarly, both town cemeteries are protected under the green space bylaw. The zone "B" encompasses the area of the village consisting of building plots. From the east and north-east, the exposure areas along the road to Strzelce and Sadków are listed under the zone "E" protection bylaw.
