= Czwórka =

Czwórka may refer to the following places in Poland:

- Czwórka in Gmina Twardogóra, Oleśnica County in Lower Silesian Voivodeship (SW Poland)
- Other places called Czwórka (listed in Polish Wikipedia)
- Polskie Radio Program IV, also known as Radiowa Czwórka
