= Ose, Poland =

Ose
- Village
- Location within Poland
- Coordinates: 51°22′53″N 17°38′14″E
- Country: Poland
- Voivodeship: Lower Silesian
- County: Oleśnica
- Gmina: Międzybórz

Ose [ˈɔsɛ] is a village in the administrative district of Gmina Międzybórz, within Oleśnica County, Lower Silesian Voivodeship, in south-western Poland.
