= Sosnówka, Oleśnica County =

Sosnówka
- Village
- Location within Poland
- Coordinates: 51°19′02″N 17°27′34″E
- Country: Poland
- Voivodeship: Lower Silesian
- County: Oleśnica
- Gmina: Twardogóra
- Population: 150

Sosnówka [sɔsˈnufka] is a village in the administrative district of Gmina Twardogóra, within Oleśnica County, Lower Silesian Voivodeship, in south-western Poland.
