= Kuźnia Goszczańska =

- Village
- Location within Poland
- Coordinates: 51°24′41″N 17°26′30″E
- Country: Poland
- Voivodeship: Lower Silesian
- County: Oleśnica
- Gmina: Twardogóra

Kuźnia Goszczańska [ˈkuʑɲa ɡɔʂˈt͡ʂaɲska] is a village in the administrative district of Gmina Twardogóra, within Oleśnica County, Lower Silesian Voivodeship, in south-western Poland.
