= Trzy Chałupy, Oleśnica County =

Trzy Chałupy
- Village
- Location within Poland
- Coordinates: 51°23′44″N 17°26′15″E
- Country: Poland
- Voivodeship: Lower Silesian
- County: Oleśnica
- Gmina: Twardogóra

Trzy Chałupy [ˈtʂɨ xaˈwupɨ] is a village in the administrative district of Gmina Twardogóra, within Oleśnica County, Lower Silesian Voivodeship, in south-western Poland.
