= Grabowno Wielkie =

- Village
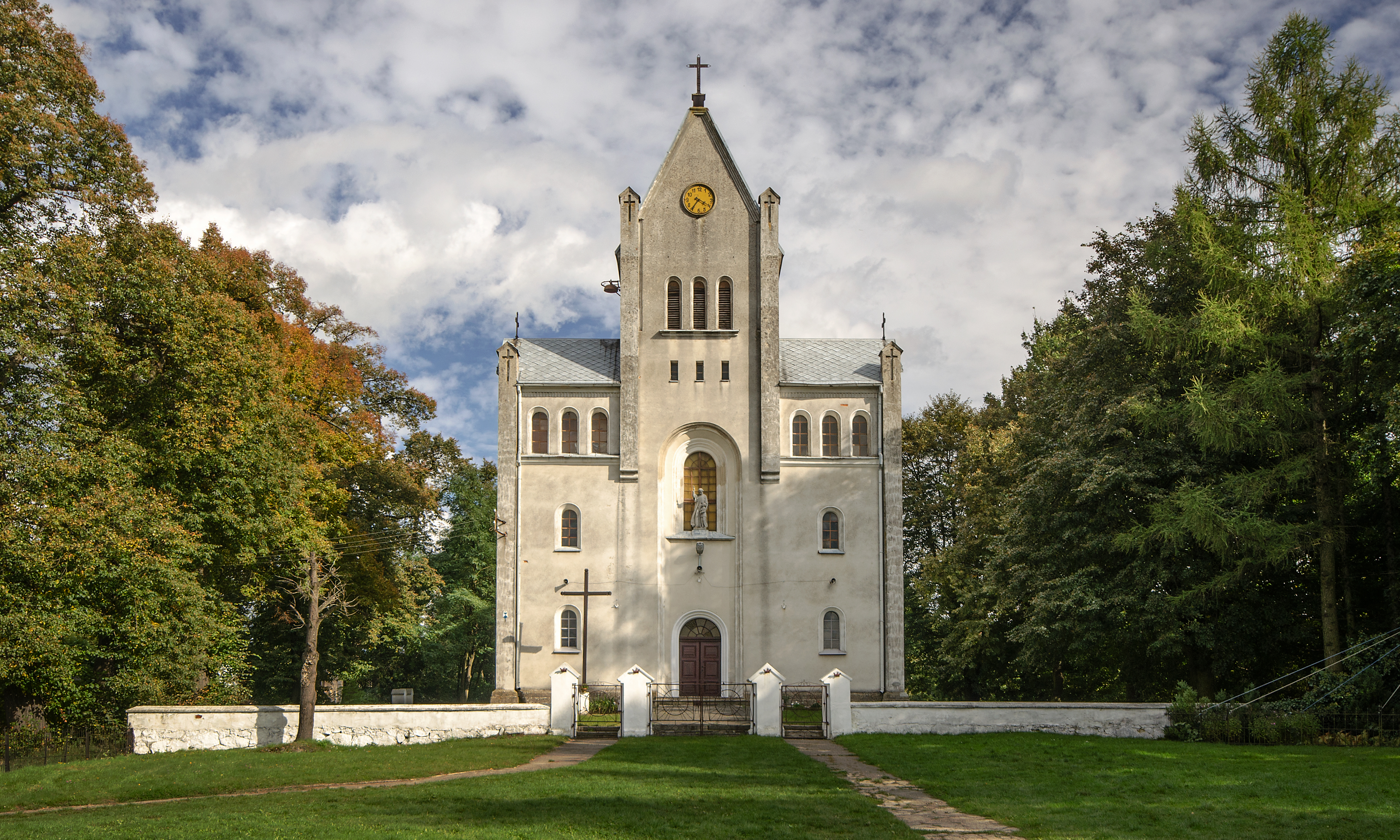

- Location within Poland
- Coordinates: 51°20′59″N 17°25′05″E
- Country: Poland
- Voivodeship: Lower Silesian
- County: Oleśnica
- Gmina: Twardogóra

Population
  - Total: 1,200
- Time zone: UTC+1 (CET)
  - Summer (DST): UTC+2 (CEST)
- Vehicle registration: DOL

Grabowno Wielkie [ɡraˈbɔvnɔ ˈvjɛlkʲɛ] is a village in the administrative district of Gmina Twardogóra, within Oleśnica County, Lower Silesian Voivodeship, in south-western Poland.

Grabowno Wielkie is an important railroad junction, where the connection from Wrocław divides into two lines - towards Ostrów Wielkopolski, and towards Krotoszyn.
