= Malerzów =

- Village
- Location within Poland
- Coordinates: 51°21′57″N 17°19′25″E
- Country: Poland
- Voivodeship: Lower Silesian
- County: Oleśnica
- Gmina: Dobroszyce
- Population: 200

Malerzów [maˈlɛʐuf] is a village in the administrative district of Gmina Dobroszyce, within Oleśnica County, Lower Silesian Voivodeship, in south-western Poland.
