= Jezioro, Lower Silesian Voivodeship =

Jezioro
- Village
- Location within Poland
- Coordinates: 51°26′02″N 17°31′09″E
- Country: Poland
- Voivodeship: Lower Silesian
- County: Oleśnica
- Gmina: Twardogóra

Jezioro [jɛˈʑɔrɔ] is a village in the administrative district of Gmina Twardogóra, within Oleśnica County, Lower Silesian Voivodeship, in south-western Poland.
