= Poręby, Lower Silesian Voivodeship =

Poręby
- Village
- Location within Poland
- Coordinates: 51°26′46″N 17°31′41″E
- Country: Poland
- Voivodeship: Lower Silesian
- County: Oleśnica
- Gmina: Twardogóra

Poręby [pɔˈrɛmbɨ] is a village in the administrative district of Gmina Twardogóra, within Oleśnica County, Lower Silesian Voivodeship, in south-western Poland.
