= Bukowina Sycowska =

- Village
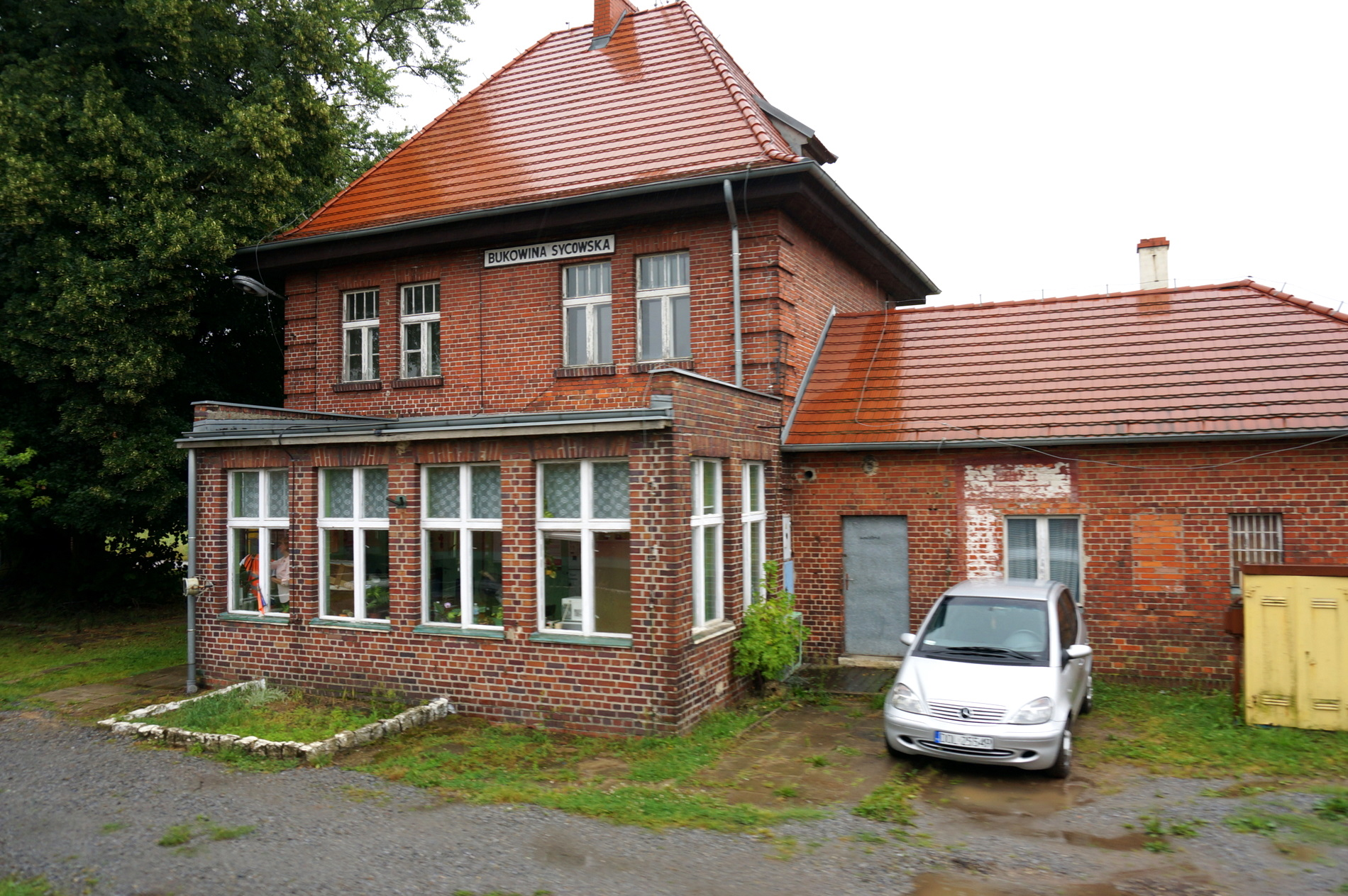
- Railway station

- Location within Poland
- Coordinates: 51°23′09″N 17°34′36″E
- Country: Poland
- Voivodeship: Lower Silesian
- County: Oleśnica
- Gmina: Międzybórz

Bukowina Sycowska [bukɔˈvina sɨˈt͡sɔfska] is a village in the administrative district of Gmina Międzybórz, within Oleśnica County, Lower Silesian Voivodeship, in south-western Poland.
