= Olszówka, Lower Silesian Voivodeship =

Olszówka
- Village
- Location within Poland
- Coordinates: 51°23′33″N 17°25′11″E
- Country: Poland
- Voivodeship: Lower Silesian
- County: Oleśnica
- Gmina: Twardogóra

Olszówka [ɔlˈʂufka] is a village in the administrative district of Gmina Twardogóra, within Oleśnica County, Lower Silesian Voivodeship, in south-western Poland.
