= Dobrzeń =

- Village
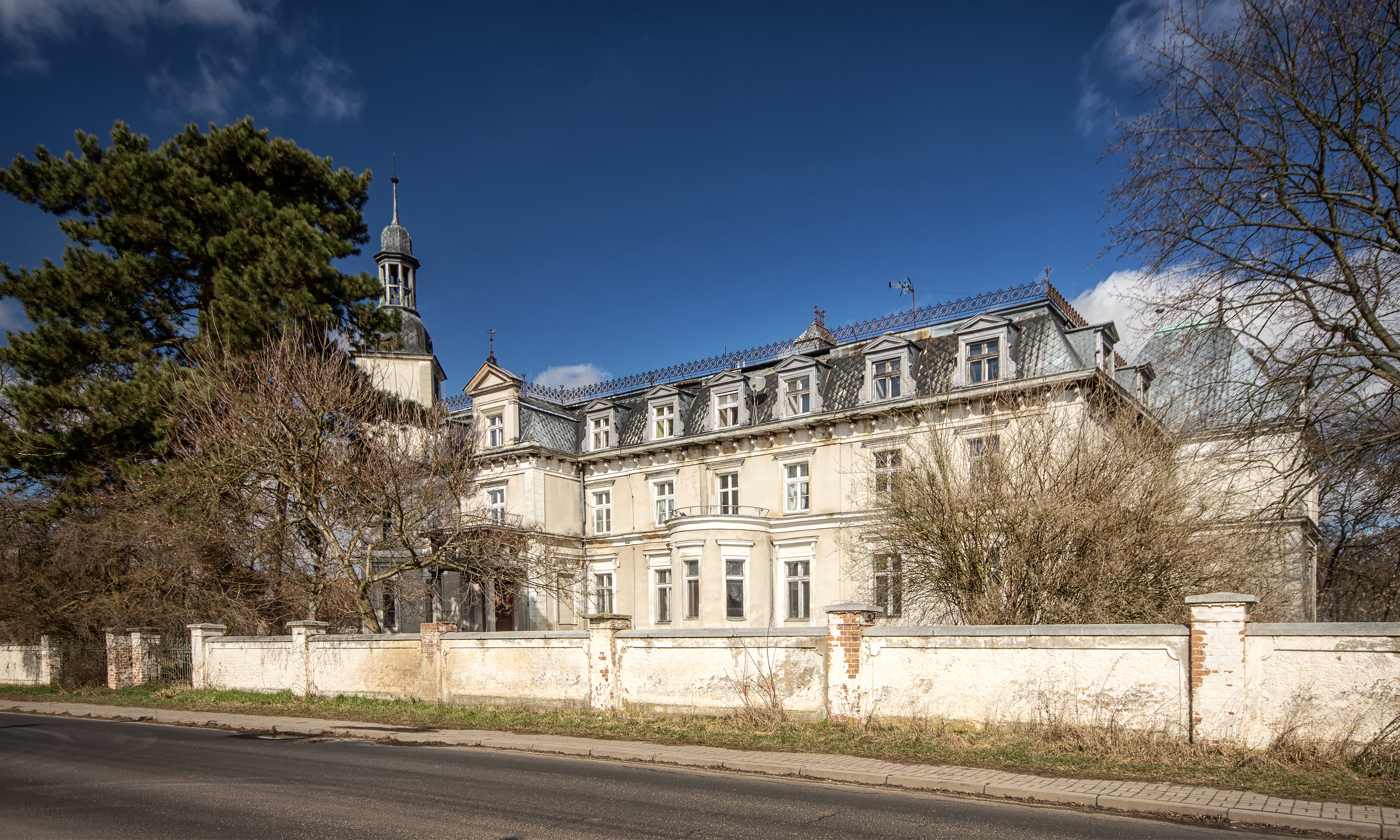
- Palace

- Location within Poland
- Coordinates: 51°15′N 17°17′E
- Country: Poland
- Voivodeship: Lower Silesian
- County: Oleśnica
- Gmina: Dobroszyce
- Population: 798

Dobrzeń (Polish pronunciation: [ˈdɔbʐɛj̃]) is a village in the administrative district of Gmina Dobroszyce, within Oleśnica County, Lower Silesian Voivodeship, in south-western Poland.
