= Kamień, Oleśnica County =

Kamień
- Village
- Location within Poland
- Coordinates: 51°24′05″N 17°34′52″E
- Country: Poland
- Voivodeship: Lower Silesian
- County: Oleśnica
- Gmina: Międzybórz

Kamień (Polish pronunciation: [ˈkamjɛj̃]) is a village in the administrative district of Gmina Międzybórz, within Oleśnica County, Lower Silesian Voivodeship, in south-western Poland.
