= Grabek, Lower Silesian Voivodeship =

Grabek
- Village
- Location within Poland
- Coordinates: 51°27′04″N 17°30′37″E
- Country: Poland
- Voivodeship: Lower Silesian
- County: Oleśnica
- Gmina: Twardogóra

Grabek [ˈɡrabɛk] is a village in the administrative district of Gmina Twardogóra, within Oleśnica County, Lower Silesian Voivodeship, in south-western Poland.
