= Twardogóra =

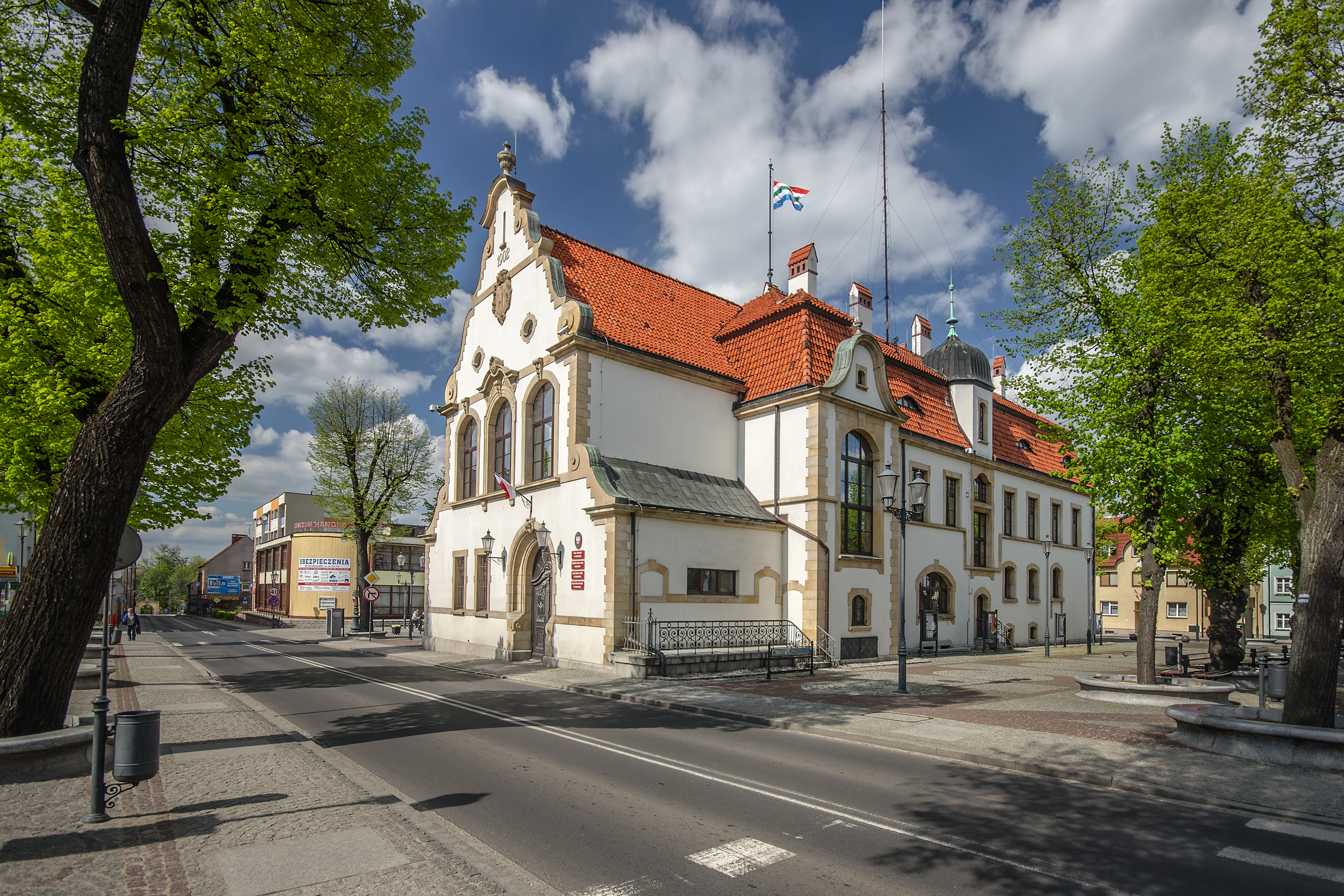
- Town Hall

- Flag Coat of arms

- Location within Poland
- Coordinates: 51°21′53″N 17°28′11″E
- Country: Poland
- Voivodeship: Lower Silesian
- County: Oleśnica
- Gmina: Twardogóra
- Town rights: 1293

Area
  - Total: 8.29 km^{2} (3.20 sq mi)

Population (2019-06-30)
  - Total: 6,692
  - Density: 807/km^{2} (2,090/sq mi)
- Time zone: UTC+1 (CET)
  - Summer (DST): UTC+2 (CEST)
- Postal code: 56-416
- Vehicle registration: DOL
- Website: http://www.twardogora.pl

Twardogóra (pronounced Tfardo-goorah [tfardɔˈɡura], German: Festenberg) is a historic town in Oleśnica County, Lower Silesian Voivodeship, in south-western Poland. It is the seat of the administrative district (gmina) called Gmina Twardogóra.

As of 2019, the town has a population of 6,692. It is part of the larger Wrocław metropolitan area.

== History ==
=== Middle Ages ===
The beginnings of Twardogóra go back to the times of Polish rule under the first Piast dynasty. It was then a trade settlement connected to the trade route from Wrocław to Poznań. It was inhabited by Poles, descendants of the Silesians tribe, and from the 12th century also settlers from other countries, especially from the German states, came to Twardogóra. The modern name of the town is said to have been created during the First Mongol invasion of Poland in 1241. The inhabitants of the settlement gave the Mongols a hard resistance and hence the name, which means in Polish "Hard Mountain". Its name also covers terrain topography (Twarda Góra). Town rights were given to Twardogóra by Henry III, Duke of Głogów on August 1, 1293. Although Polish, the town was first mentioned as Vestenberg in 1293. From the beginning of the 14th century, Twardogóra was part of the Duchy of Oleśnica, which remained under the rule of the Polish Piast dynasty until 1492, although as a fief of the Kingdom of Bohemia.

=== Early modern period ===
Residents of the city remembered the unpleasant experiences of the Hussite Wars in the late 15th century building a defensive structure. A hundred years later a castle was built there.

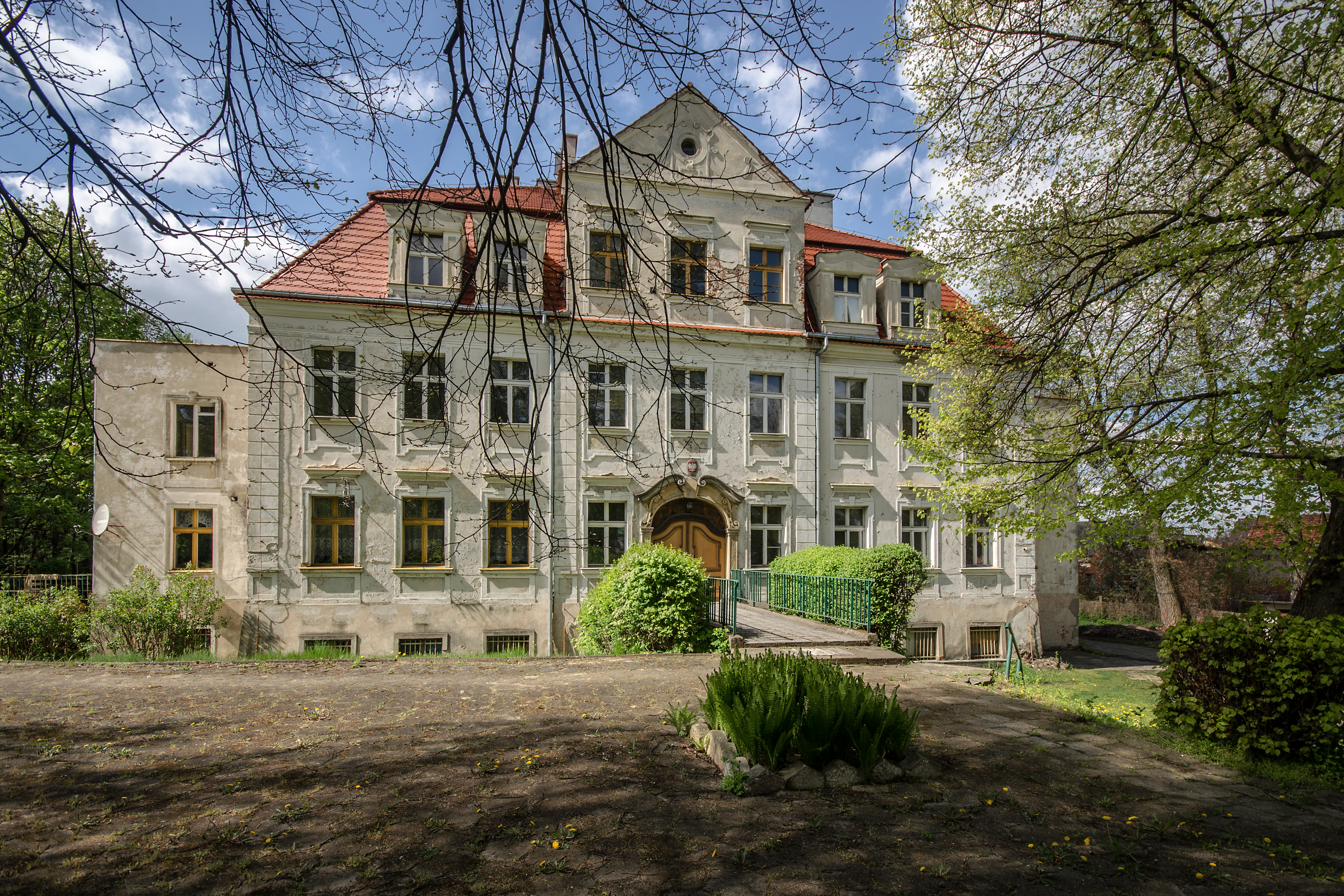
Twardogóra Palace

In 1526, Twardogóra and the Duchy of Oleśnica (Oels) came under the suzerainty of the Habsburg monarchy. At that time, duke John, from the Czech noble Podiebrad family, introduced Lutheranism in 1538. It is presumed that at that time there was already a church (lower) in the city, which was thoroughly renovated in 1587. The Duchy of Oels from 1647 was under the rule of dukes of Württemberg. During its rule, Twardogóra flourished. Change in Twardogóra was foremost contributed to by Dutches Eleonora Karolina Wirtemberska (1676–1712). She rebuilt and expanded the town's castle into a Baroque palace. She also took care of the health of the people, the development of the craft, trade and education, as well as the development of charities.

In the years 1729–1738 the church was rebuilt giving it its present shape. In 1742 Silesia became part of the Kingdom of Prussia and the town came under Prussian suzerainty, remaining part of the Duchy of Oleśnica. In 1743 Henryk L. von Reichenbach brought the town hardwood, and the town joined the newly created state country in Goszcz a year later. In 1786 the town was inhabited by 1175 people, among whom the most prosperous at the time were the weavers.

=== 19th and 20th centuries ===
At the beginning of the 19th century, two new cemeteries were set up outside the city, separate for Protestants and Catholics, and the old church cemetery was demolished. Catholics built a church in 1869 near the new market. In 1873, a fire destroyed the evangelical church, which was rebuilt three years later in Gothic Revival style. From the middle of the 19th century Twardogóra began to acquire industrial character. Henryk Piirschel founded a mechanical weaving factory in 1852, and Henry Lichtenberg began industrial furniture production.

The demographic development of the town in the 19th century (in 1885 – 2202 people, and after the merger with the Old Twardogóra in 1910 – 3351 people) caused an increase in the town's infrastructure. Before the World War I, a credit bank (1901), a printing house (1907), a court and detention center (1902), a town hall, a cemetery chapel (1906), a town hall (1912) and a new water supply (1901) and electrification of the city was conducted (1910). In 1944, the town was home to 4500 people, who primarily engaged in craft, trade and services. The town had, among other things, an agricultural and general school, two cinemas, a hospital, a child's home and extensive gastronomy. German rule ended in Twardogóra on January 23, 1945, when it came under Polish administration. As a result of Nazi Germany's defeat in World War II, the town was transferred to Poland in accordance with the Potsdam Agreement.

== Notable people ==
- Salomon Plessner (1797–1883), German Jewish translator and preacher
- Ludwig Laqueur (1839–1909), German ophthalmologist
- Paul Grützner (1847–1919), German physiologist
- Martin Pohl (1930–2007), German poet and playwright
- Hagen Kleinert (born 1941), German physicist

== Gallery ==
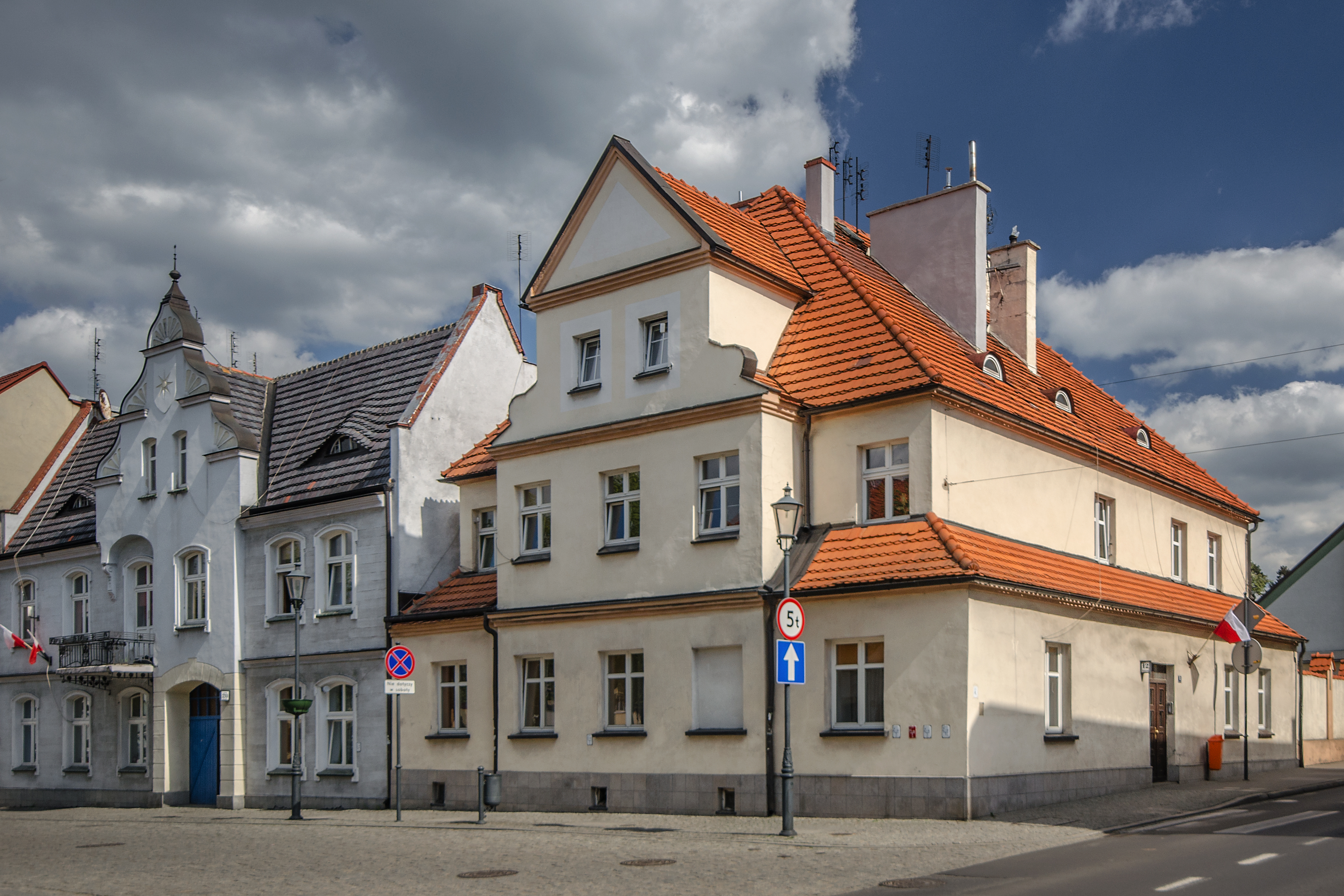
Old townhouses at the Market Square

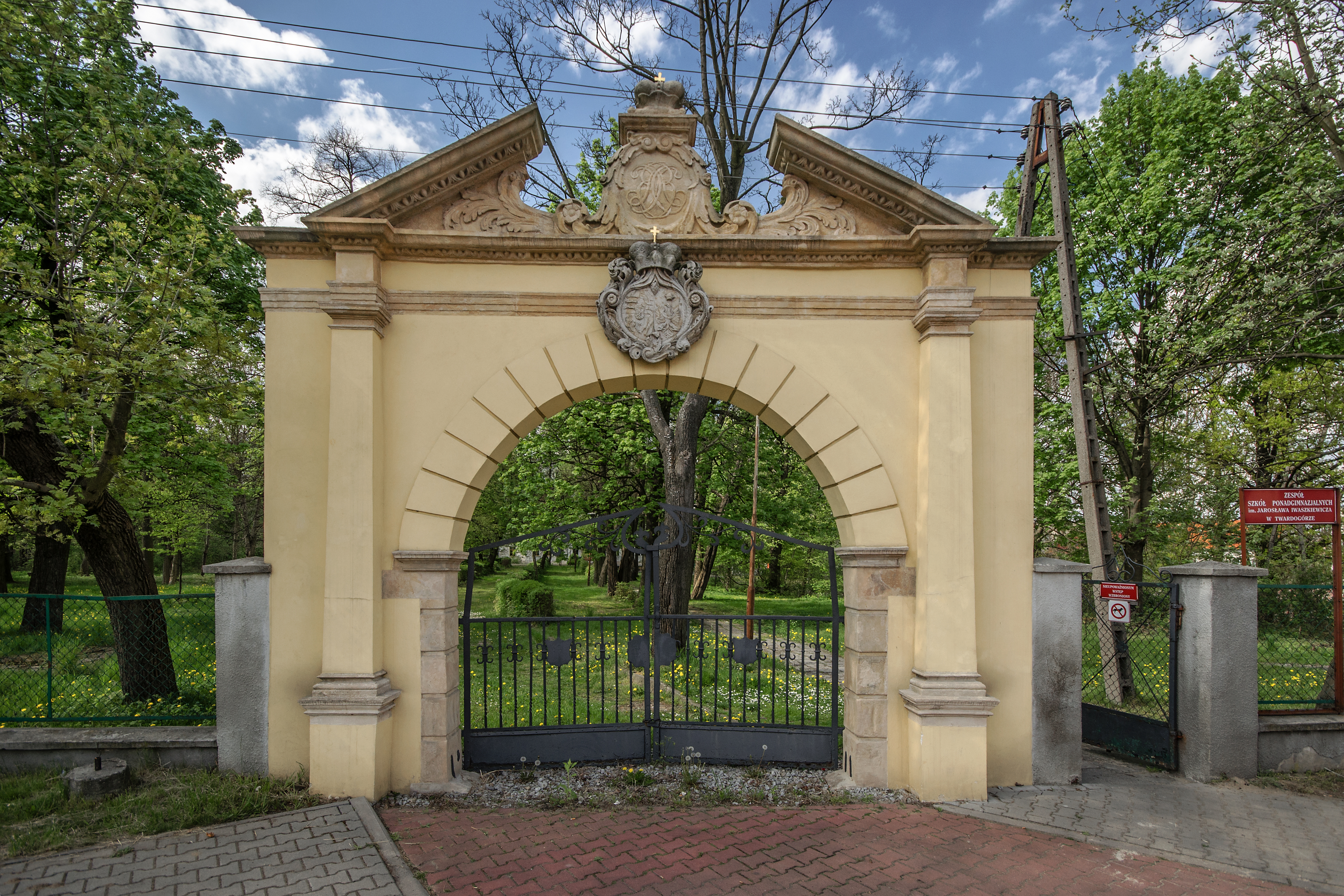
Palace Gate

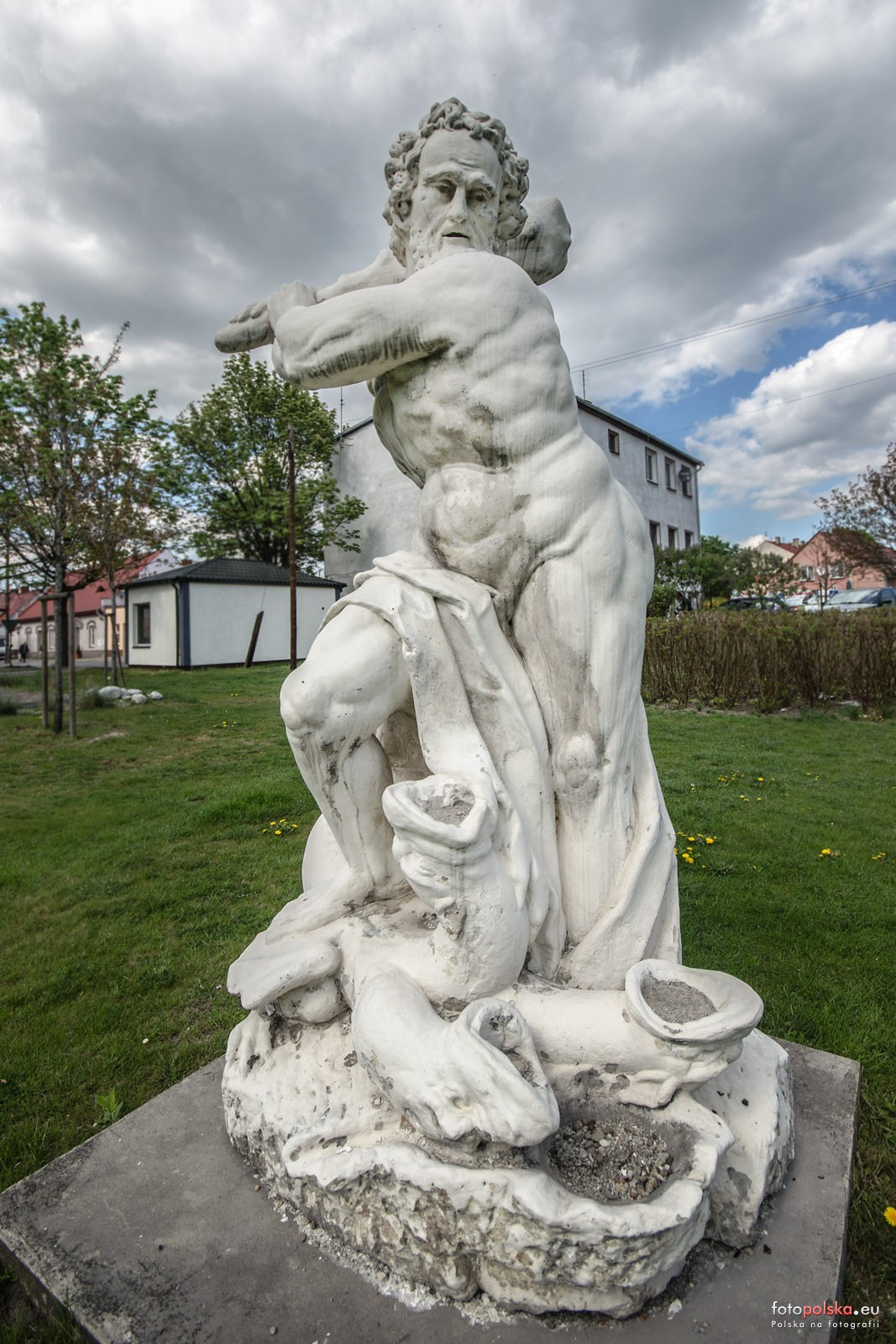
Statue of Hercules

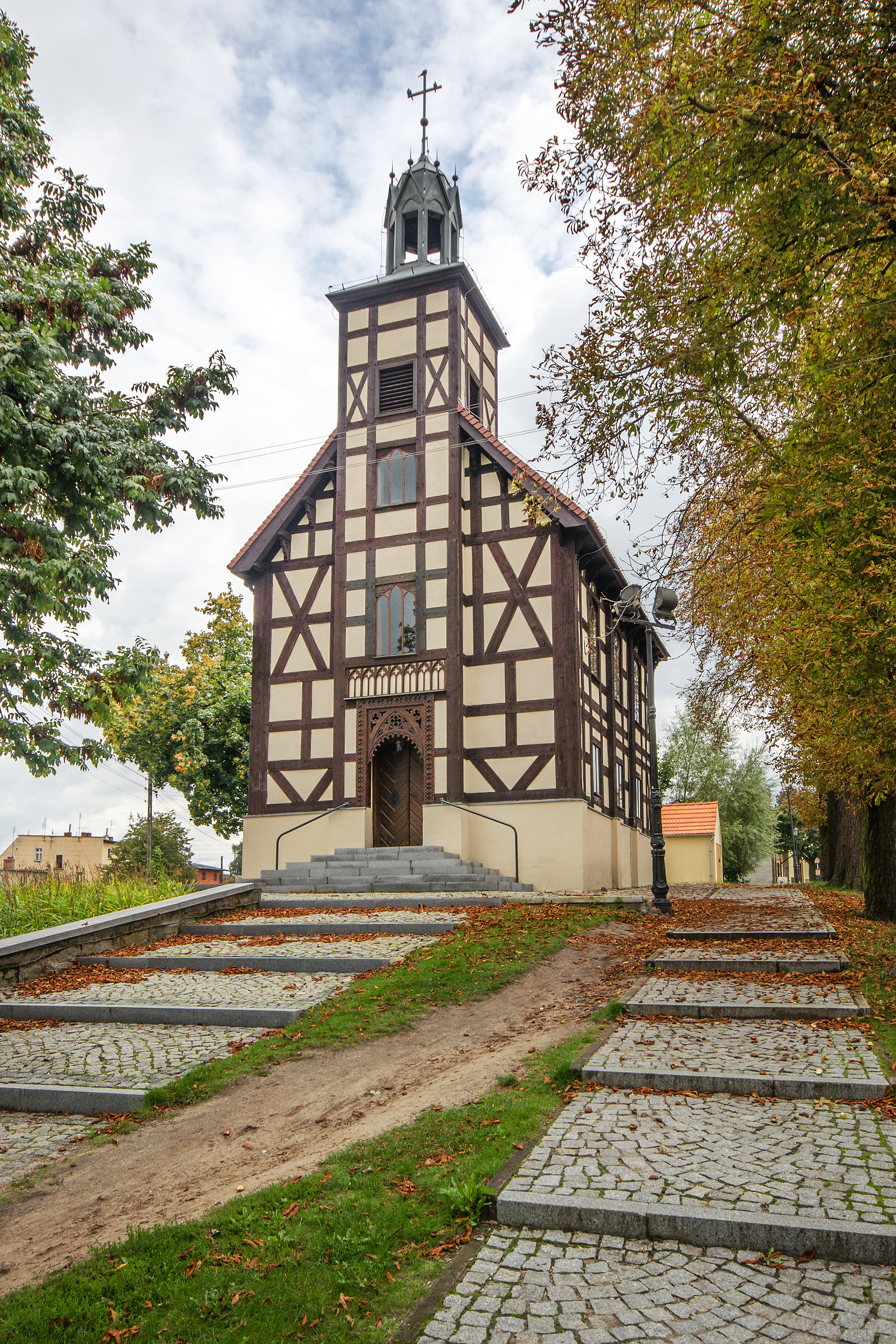
Half-timbered Church of the Holy Trinity and Mary Immaculate

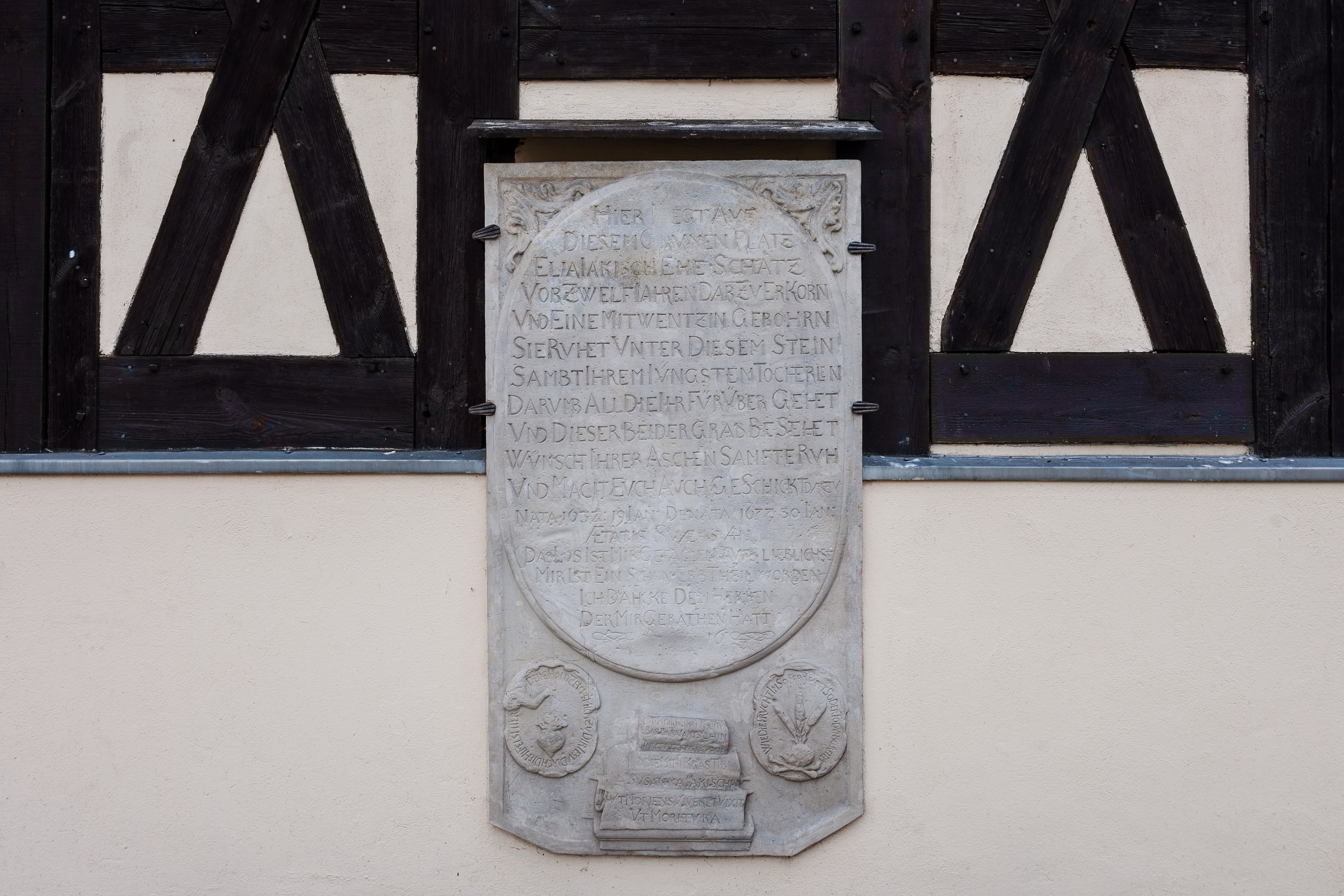
Holy Trinity Church; Jakinosin family sandstone epitaph, dating back to the late 17th century

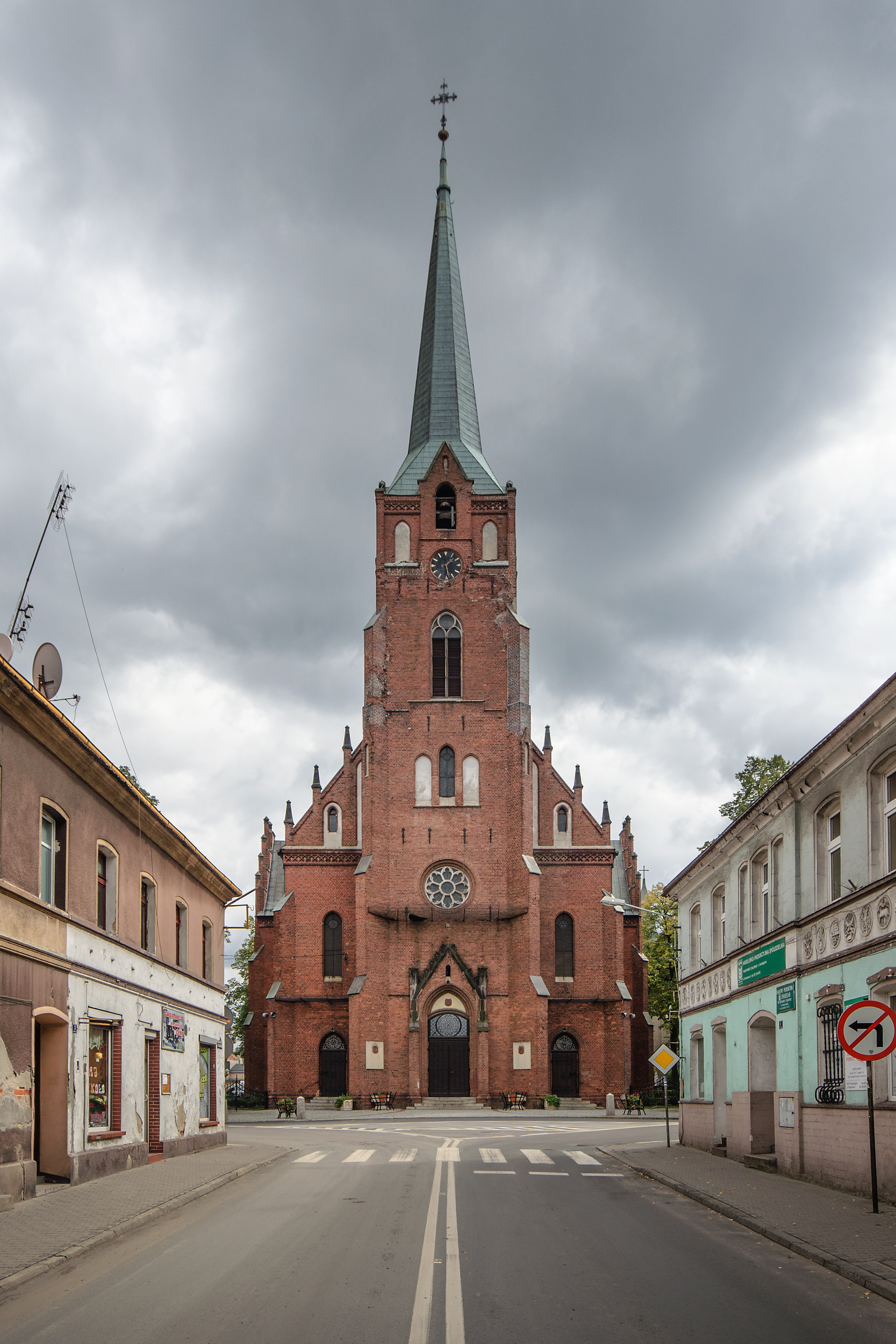
Basilica of Our Lady of Support of the Faithful

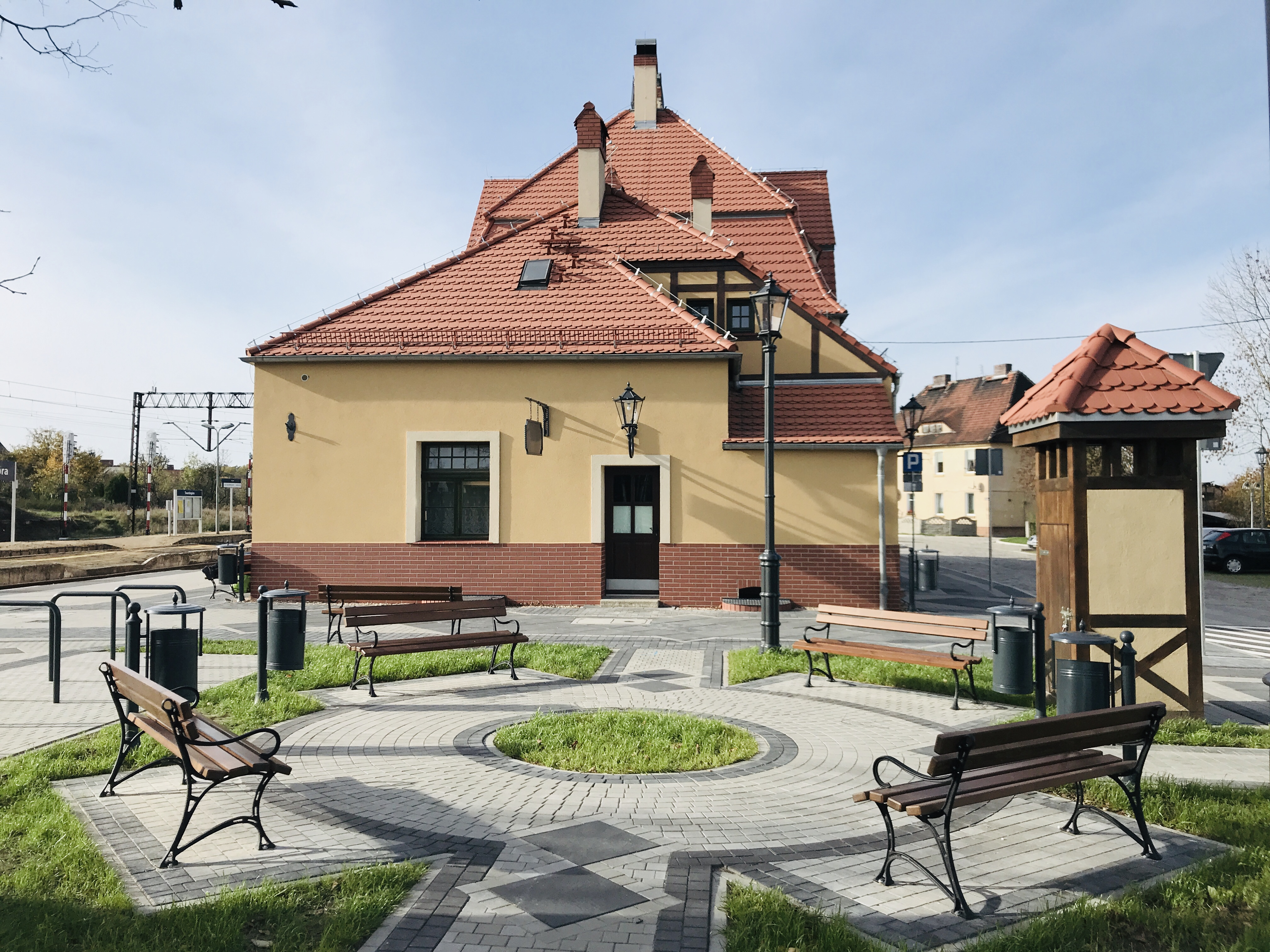
Train station

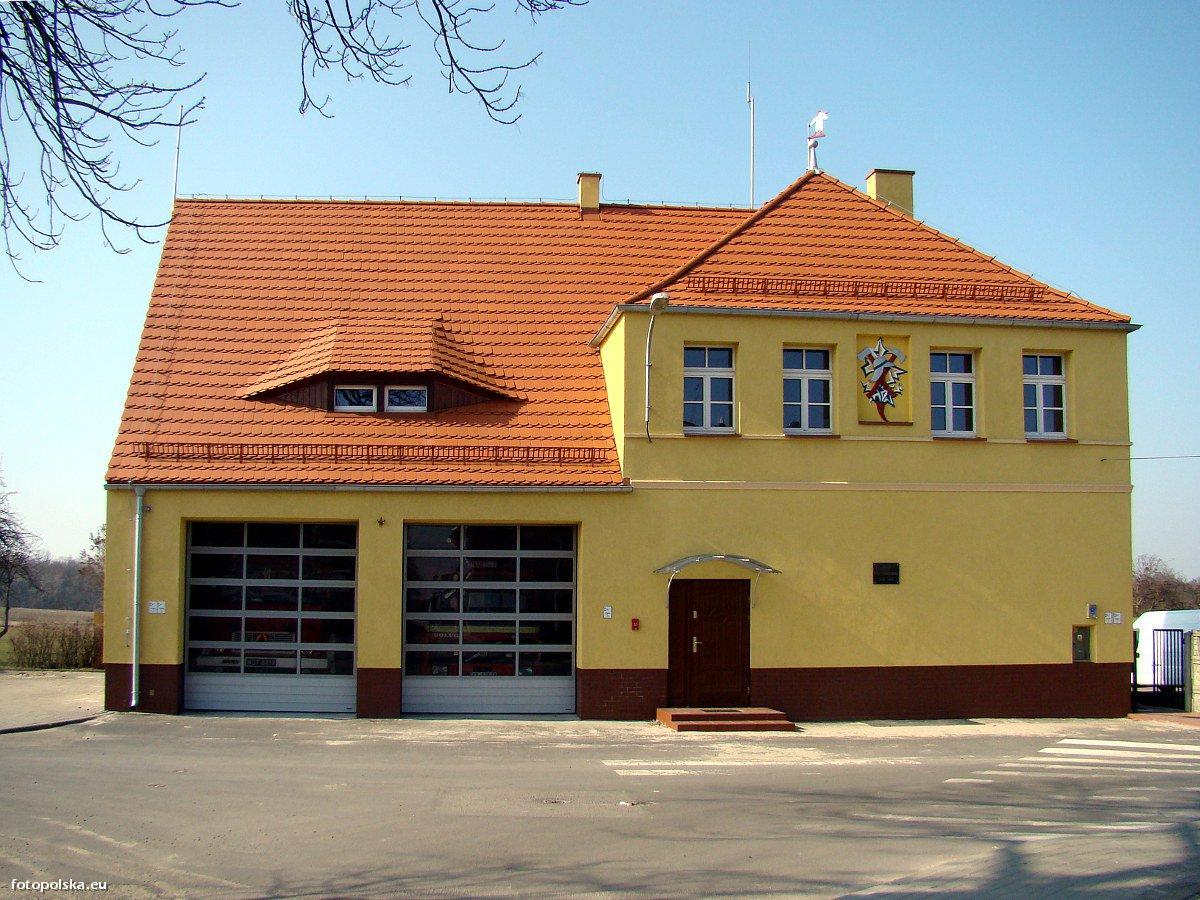
Fire Station

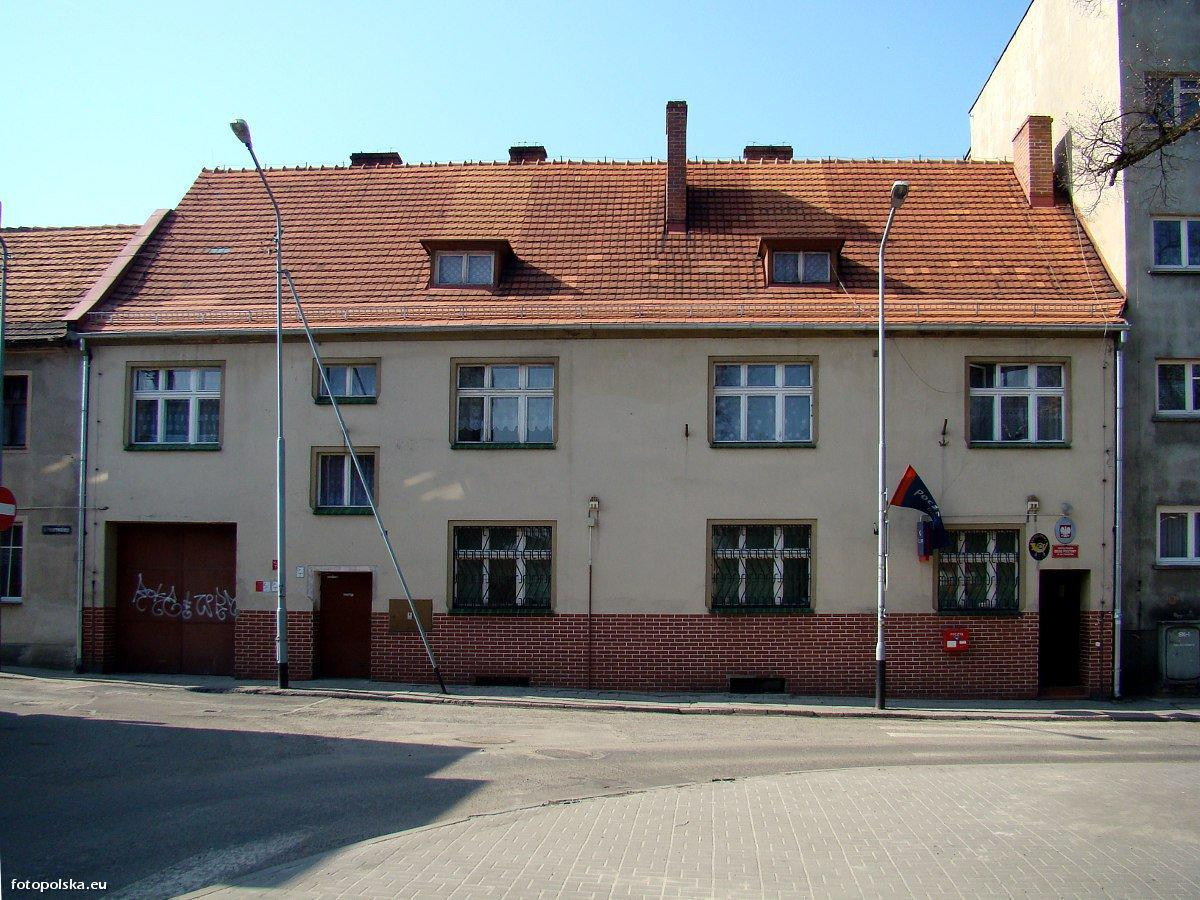
Post Office

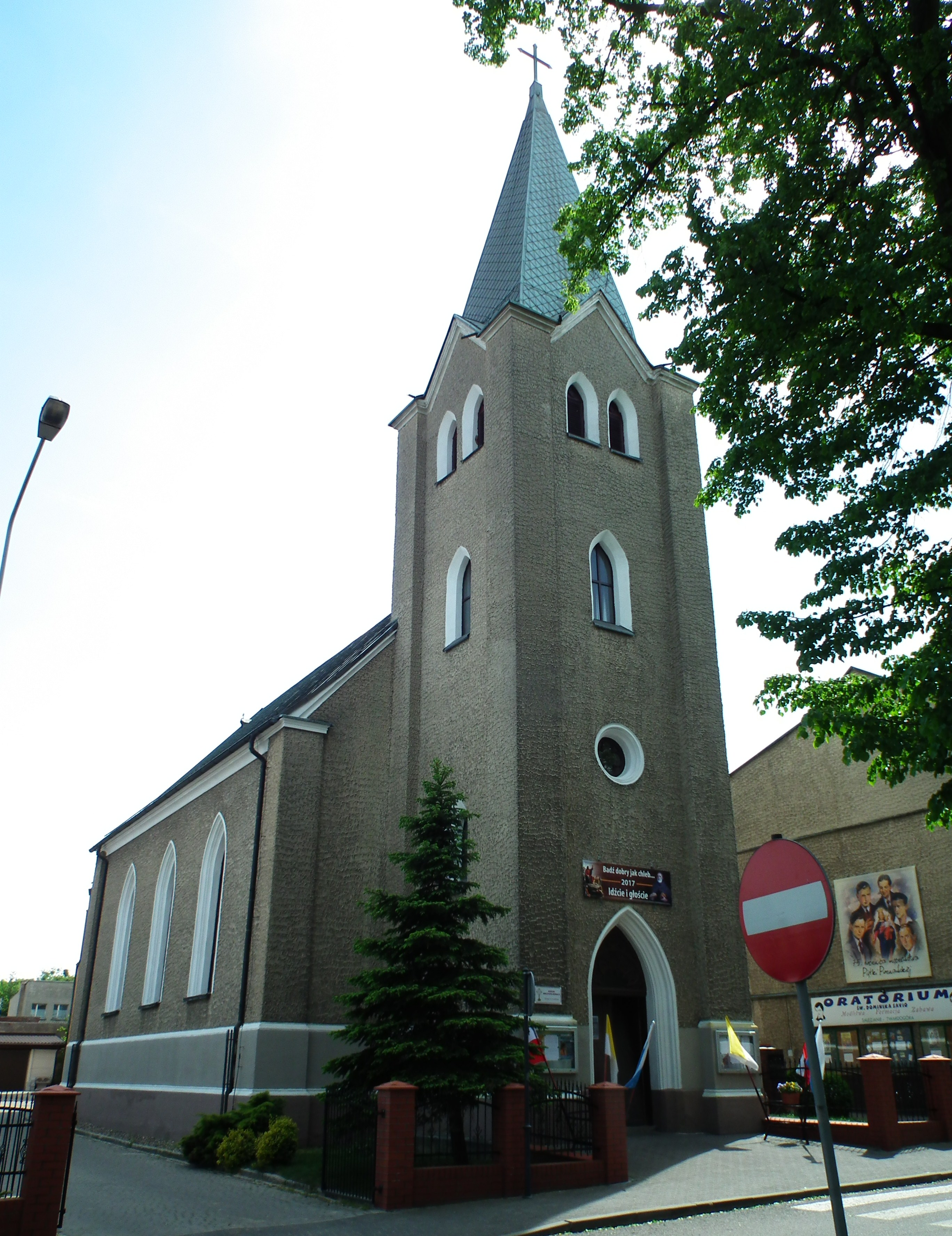
Church of the Ascension of Christ

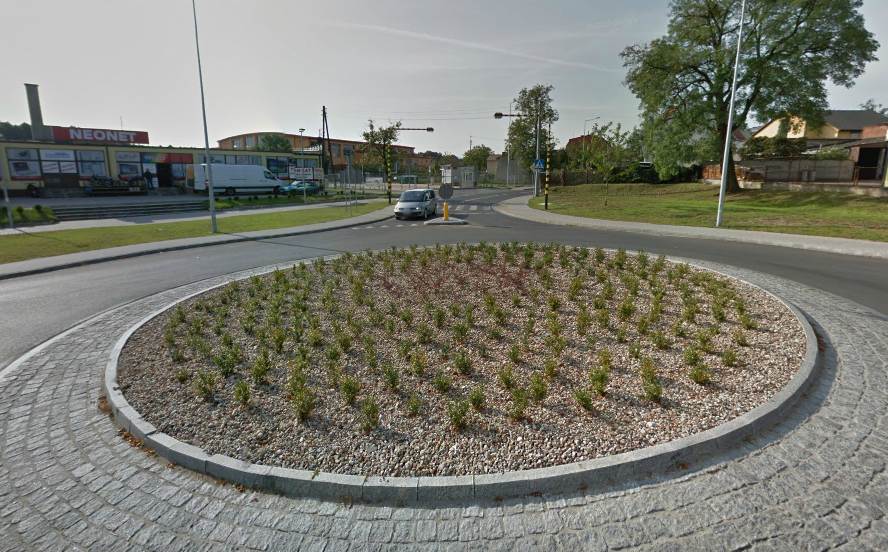
Roundabout in Twardogóra
