= Klonów, Lower Silesian Voivodeship =

Klonów
- Village
- Location within Poland
- Coordinates: 51°24′17″N 17°38′03″E
- Country: Poland
- Voivodeship: Lower Silesian
- County: Oleśnica
- Gmina: Międzybórz

Klonów [ˈklɔnuf] is a village in the administrative district of Gmina Międzybórz, within Oleśnica County, Lower Silesian Voivodeship, in south-western Poland.
