= Nowica =

Nowica may refer to the following villages:

- Nowica, Lower Silesian Voivodeship (south-west Poland)
- Nowica, Lesser Poland Voivodeship (south Poland)
- Nowica, Warmian-Masurian Voivodeship (north Poland)
- Nowica, Galicia – now the Village of Novytsya, Ivano-Frankivsk Oblast (western Ukraine)
