= Wesółka =

Wesółka may refer to the following places in Poland:

- Wesółka, Lower Silesian Voivodeship (south-west Poland)
- Wesółka, Masovian Voivodeship (east-central Poland)
