= Chełstów =

- Village
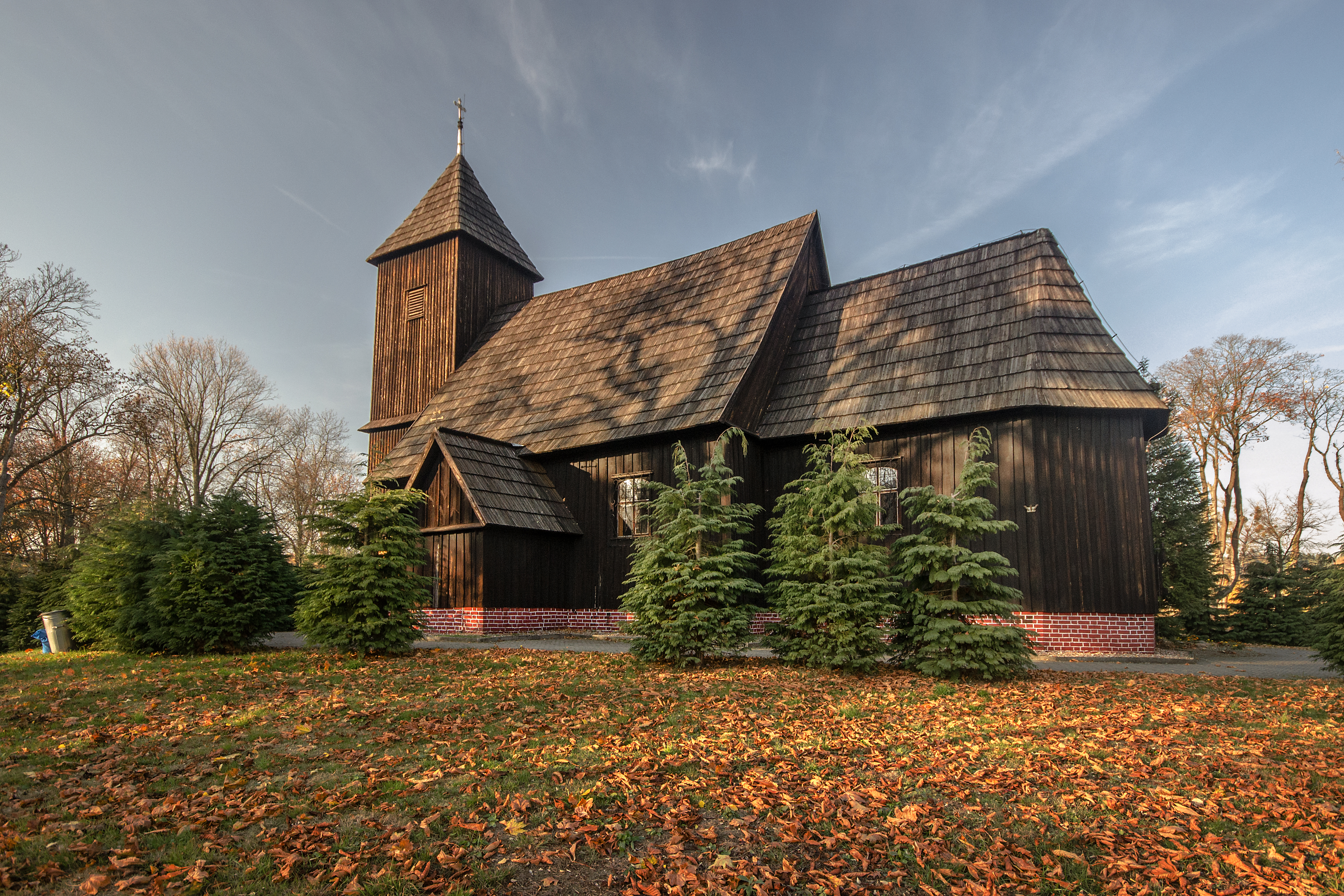
- Catholic church

- Location within Poland
- Coordinates: 51°20′10″N 17°29′48″E
- Country: Poland
- Voivodeship: Lower Silesian
- County: Oleśnica
- Gmina: Twardogóra

Chełstów [ˈxɛu̯stuf] is a village in the administrative district of Gmina Twardogóra, within Oleśnica County, Lower Silesian Voivodeship, in south-western Poland.
