= Łazisko, Lower Silesian Voivodeship =

Łazisko
- Village
- Location within Poland
- Coordinates: 51°25′26″N 17°30′48″E
- Country: Poland
- Voivodeship: Lower Silesian
- County: Oleśnica
- Gmina: Twardogóra

Łazisko [waˈʑiskɔ] is a village in the administrative district of Gmina Twardogóra, within Oleśnica County, Lower Silesian Voivodeship, in south-western Poland.
