= Białe Błoto, Lower Silesian Voivodeship =

Białe Błoto
- Village
- Location within Poland
- Coordinates: 51°19′59″N 17°21′13″E
- Country: Poland
- Voivodeship: Lower Silesian
- County: Oleśnica
- Gmina: Dobroszyce
- Population: 157

Białe Błoto [ˈbjawɛ ˈbwɔtɔ] is a village in the administrative district of Gmina Dobroszyce, within Oleśnica County, Lower Silesian Voivodeship, in south-western Poland.
