= Dobra, Oleśnica County =

Dobra
- Village
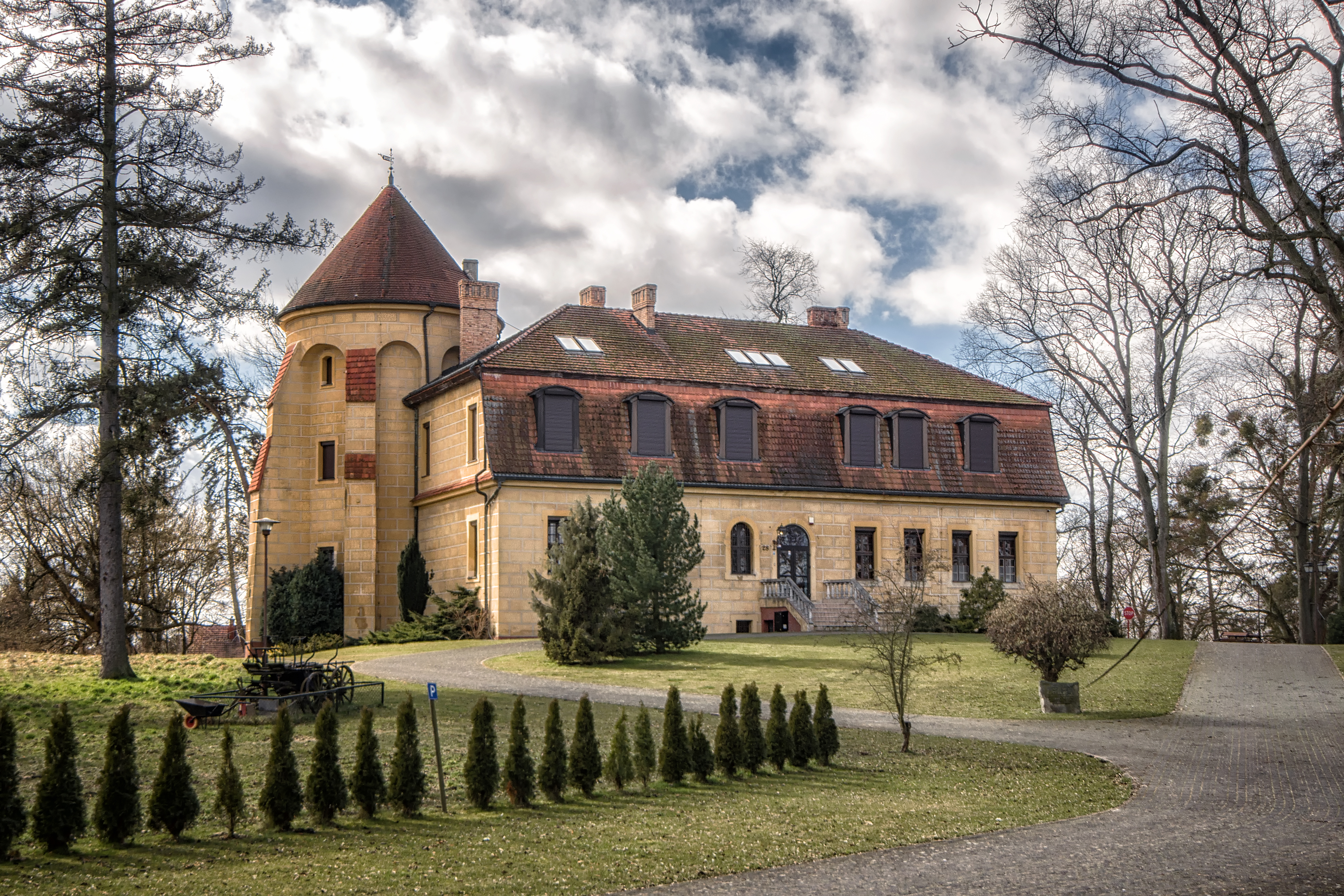
- Manor

- Location within Poland
- Coordinates: 51°14′17″N 17°18′24″E
- Country: Poland
- Voivodeship: Lower Silesian
- County: Oleśnica
- Gmina: Dobroszyce
- Population: 350

Dobra [ˈdɔbra] is a village in the administrative district of Gmina Dobroszyce, within Oleśnica County, Lower Silesian Voivodeship, in south-western Poland.
