= Drogoszowice =

- Village
- Location within Poland
- Coordinates: 51°19′31″N 17°28′53″E
- Country: Poland
- Voivodeship: Lower Silesian
- County: Oleśnica
- Gmina: Twardogóra

Drogoszowice [drɔɡɔʂɔˈvit͡sɛ] is a village in the administrative district of Gmina Twardogóra, within Oleśnica County, Lower Silesian Voivodeship, in south-western Poland.
