= Bąków, Oleśnica County =

Bąków
- Village
- Location within Poland
- Coordinates: 51°24′22″N 17°33′10″E
- Country: Poland
- Voivodeship: Lower Silesian
- County: Oleśnica
- Gmina: Międzybórz

Bąków [ˈbɔŋkuf] is a village in the administrative district of Gmina Międzybórz, within Oleśnica County, Lower Silesian Voivodeship, in south-western Poland.
