= Kuźnica Goszczańska =

- Village
- Location within Poland
- Coordinates: 51°24′03″N 17°27′06″E
- Country: Poland
- Voivodeship: Lower Silesian
- County: Oleśnica
- Gmina: Twardogóra

Kuźnica Goszczańska (Polish pronunciation: [kuʑˈɲit͡sa ɡɔʂˈt͡ʂaj̃ska]) is a village in the administrative district of Gmina Twardogóra, within Oleśnica County, Lower Silesian Voivodeship, in south-western Poland.
