= Siekierowice =

- Village
- Location within Poland
- Coordinates: 51°16′22″N 17°16′32″E
- Country: Poland
- Voivodeship: Lower Silesian
- County: Oleśnica
- Gmina: Dobroszyce
- Population: 390

Siekierowice [ɕɛkʲɛrɔˈvit͡sɛ] is a village in the administrative district of Gmina Dobroszyce, within Oleśnica County, Lower Silesian Voivodeship, in south-western Poland.
