= Dziesławice, Lower Silesian Voivodeship =

Dziesławice
- Village
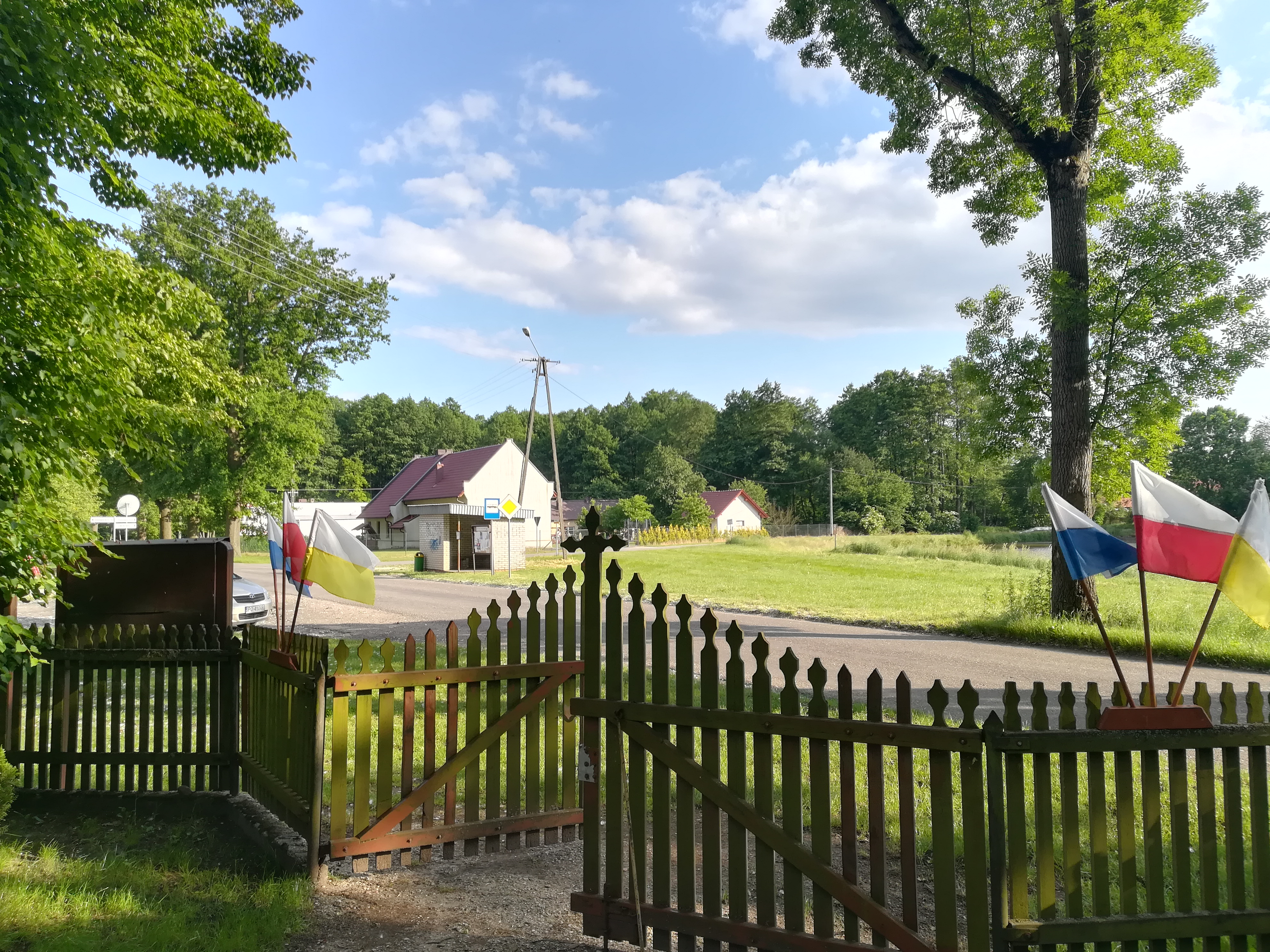

- Location within Poland
- Coordinates: 51°21′05″N 17°37′58″E
- Country: Poland
- Voivodeship: Lower Silesian
- County: Oleśnica
- Gmina: Międzybórz

Dziesławice [d͡ʑɛswaˈvit͡sɛ] is a village in the administrative district of Gmina Międzybórz, within Oleśnica County, Lower Silesian Voivodeship, in south-western Poland.
