= Pajęczak, Lower Silesian Voivodeship =

Pajęczak
- Village
- Location within Poland
- Coordinates: 51°26′25″N 17°30′17″E
- Country: Poland
- Voivodeship: Lower Silesian
- County: Oleśnica
- Gmina: Twardogóra

Pajęczak [paˈjɛnt͡ʂak] is a village in the administrative district of Gmina Twardogóra, within Oleśnica County, Lower Silesian Voivodeship, in south-western Poland.
