= Miodary =

Miodary may refer to the following places in Poland:

- Miodary, Lower Silesian Voivodeship (south-west Poland)
- Miodary, Opole Voivodeship (south-west Poland)
