= Moszyce =

- Village
- Location within Poland
- Coordinates: 51°22′18″N 17°28′46″E
- Country: Poland
- Voivodeship: Lower Silesian
- County: Oleśnica
- Gmina: Twardogóra

Moszyce [mɔˈʂɨt͡sɛ] is a village in the administrative district of Gmina Twardogóra, within Oleśnica County, Lower Silesian Voivodeship, in south-western Poland.
