= Mękarzowice =

Mękarzowice may refer to the following places in Poland:

- Mękarzowice, Lower Silesian Voivodeship (south-west Poland)
- Mękarzowice, Świętokrzyskie Voivodeship (south-central Poland)
