= Nowa Wieś Goszczańska =

- Village
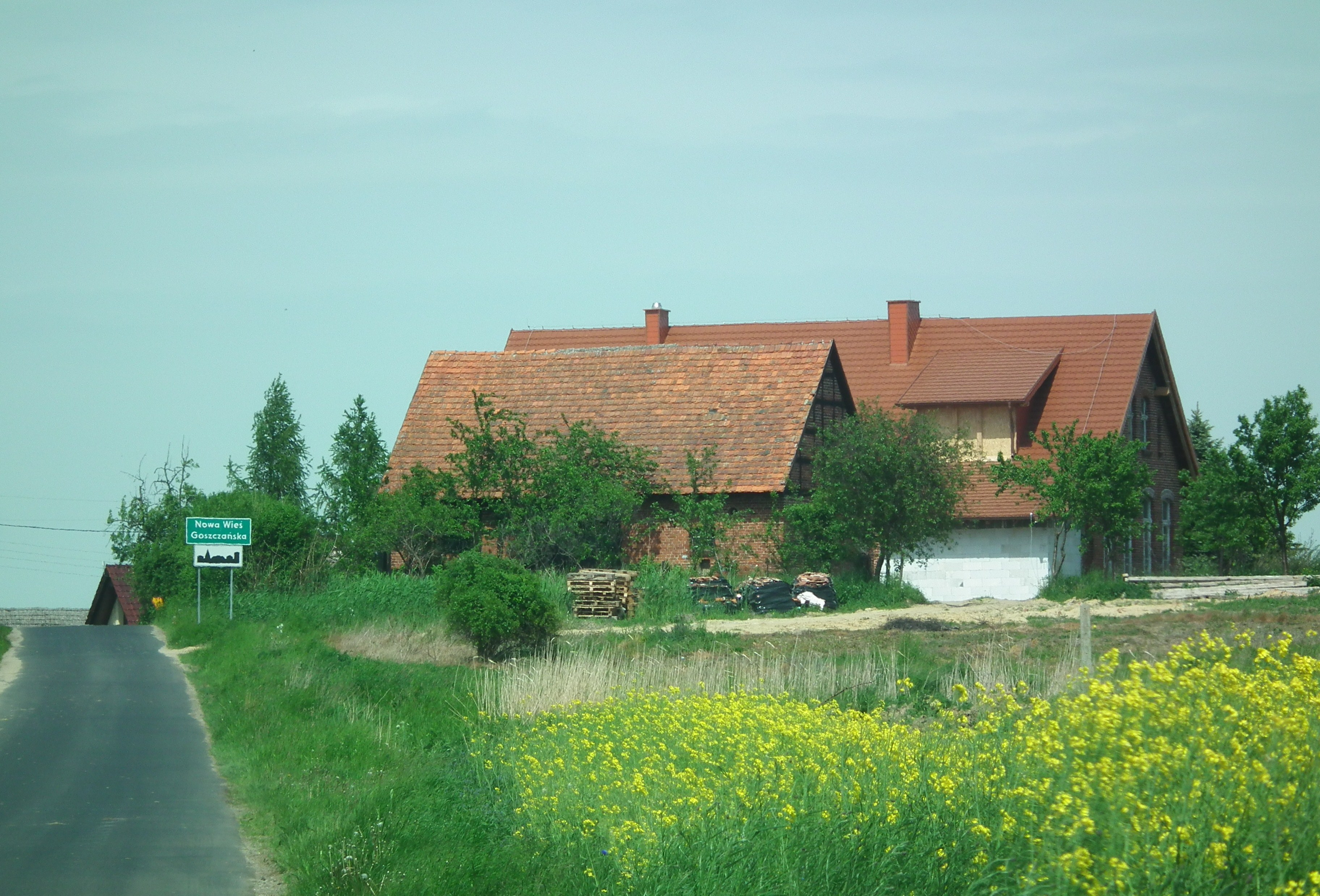
- Houses by the roadside in Nowa Wieś Goszczańska

- Location within Poland
- Coordinates: 51°25′13″N 17°27′04″E
- Country: Poland
- Voivodeship: Lower Silesian
- County: Oleśnica
- Gmina: Twardogóra

Nowa Wieś Goszczańska [ˈnɔva ˈvjɛɕ ɡɔʂˈt͡ʂaɲska] is a village in the administrative district of Gmina Twardogóra, within Oleśnica County, Lower Silesian Voivodeship, in south-western Poland.
