= Oska Piła =

- Village
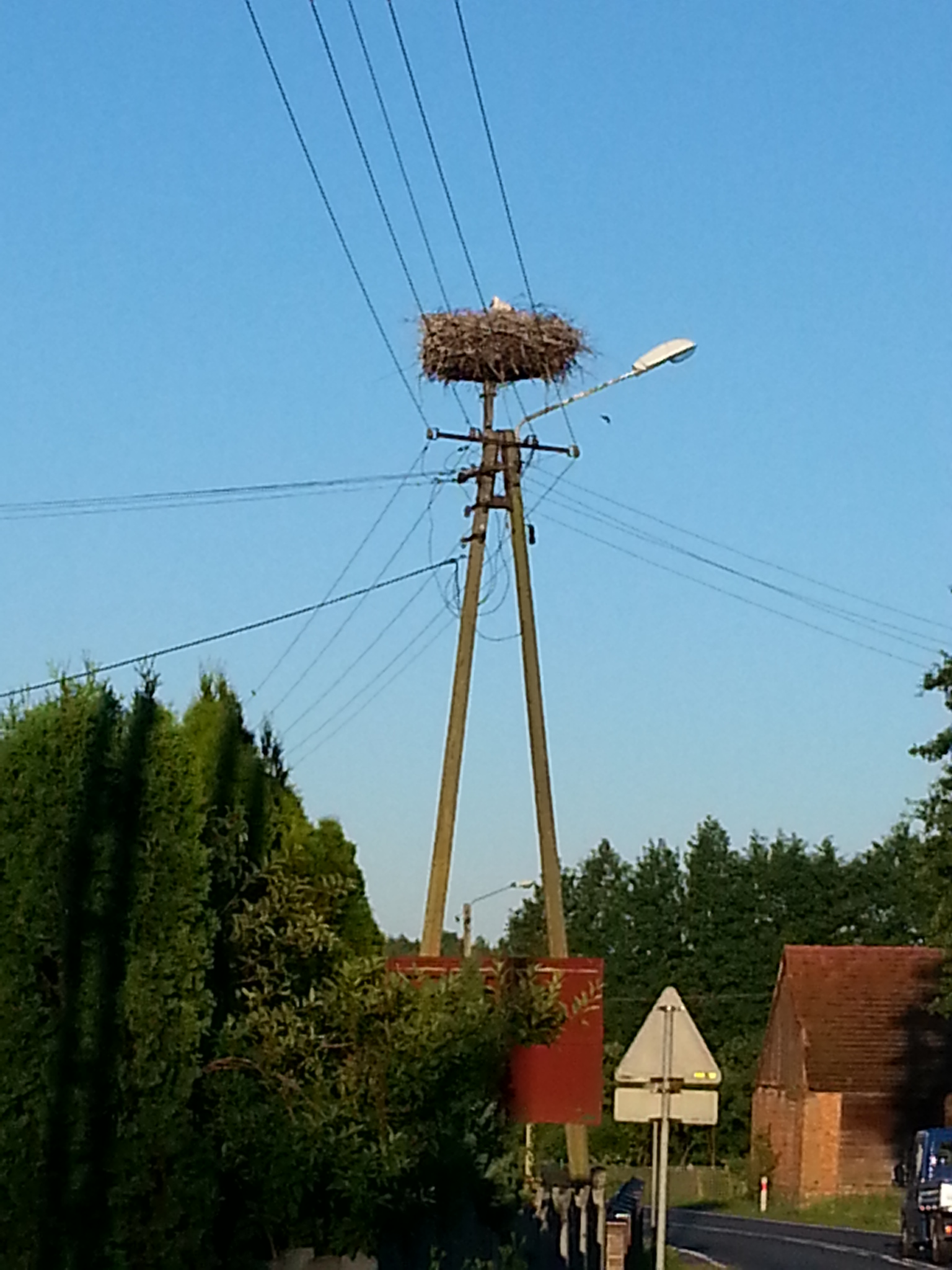

- Location within Poland
- Coordinates: 51°22′19″N 17°37′07″E
- Country: Poland
- Voivodeship: Lower Silesian
- County: Oleśnica
- Gmina: Międzybórz

Oska Piła [ˈɔska ˈpiwa] is a village in the administrative district of Gmina Międzybórz, within Oleśnica County, Lower Silesian Voivodeship, in south-western Poland.
