= Bartków, Oleśnica County =

Bartków
- Village
- Location within Poland
- Coordinates: 51°18′57″N 17°20′39″E
- Country: Poland
- Voivodeship: Lower Silesian
- County: Oleśnica
- Gmina: Dobroszyce
- Population: 72

Bartków [ˈbartkuf] is a village in the administrative district of Gmina Dobroszyce, within Oleśnica County, Lower Silesian Voivodeship, in south-western Poland.
