= Będzin (disambiguation) =

Będzin is a town in Silesian Voivodeship (S Poland).

Będzin may also refer to:

- Będzin, Lower Silesian Voivodeship (south-west Poland)
- Będzin, West Pomeranian Voivodeship (north-west Poland)
