= Hałdrychowice =

- Village
- Location within Poland
- Coordinates: 51°21′48″N 17°39′32″E
- Country: Poland
- Voivodeship: Lower Silesian
- County: Oleśnica
- Gmina: Międzybórz

Hałdrychowice [xau̯drɨxɔˈvit͡sɛ] is a village in the administrative district of Gmina Międzybórz, within Oleśnica County, Lower Silesian Voivodeship, in south-western Poland.
