= Martin Pohl =

Martin Pohl may refer to:

- Martin Pohl (writer) (1930–2007), German poet and playwright
- Řezník (rapper) (born 1986), real name of Czech rapper
- Martin Pohl (footballer) (born 1981), German footballer
- Martin Pohl (diplomat) (born 1967), Czech diplomat, ambassador to Australia after Hynek Kmoníček

== See also ==
- Martin Poll (1922–2012), American film and television producer
- Martin Poll (priest) (born 1961), British Church of England priest
