= Niwki Kraszowskie =

- Village
- Location within Poland
- Coordinates: 51°23′55″N 17°42′41″E
- Country: Poland
- Voivodeship: Lower Silesian
- County: Oleśnica
- Gmina: Międzybórz

Niwki Kraszowskie [ˈnifki kraˈʂɔfskʲɛ] is a village in the administrative district of Gmina Międzybórz, within Oleśnica County, Lower Silesian Voivodeship, in south-western Poland.
