= Domasławice =

Domasławice may refer to the following places in Poland:

- Domasławice, Lower Silesian Voivodeship (south-west Poland)
- Domasławice, West Pomeranian Voivodeship (north-west Poland)
