= Niwki Książęce =

- Village
- Location within Poland
- Coordinates: 51°24′N 17°44′E
- Country: Poland
- Voivodeship: Lower Silesian
- County: Oleśnica
- Gmina: Międzybórz

Niwki Książęce ([ˈnifki kɕɔ̃ˈʐɛnt͡sɛ]) is a village in the administrative district of Gmina Międzybórz, within Oleśnica County, Lower Silesian Voivodeship, in south-western Poland.
