= Paul Grützner =

German physiologist (1847–1919)

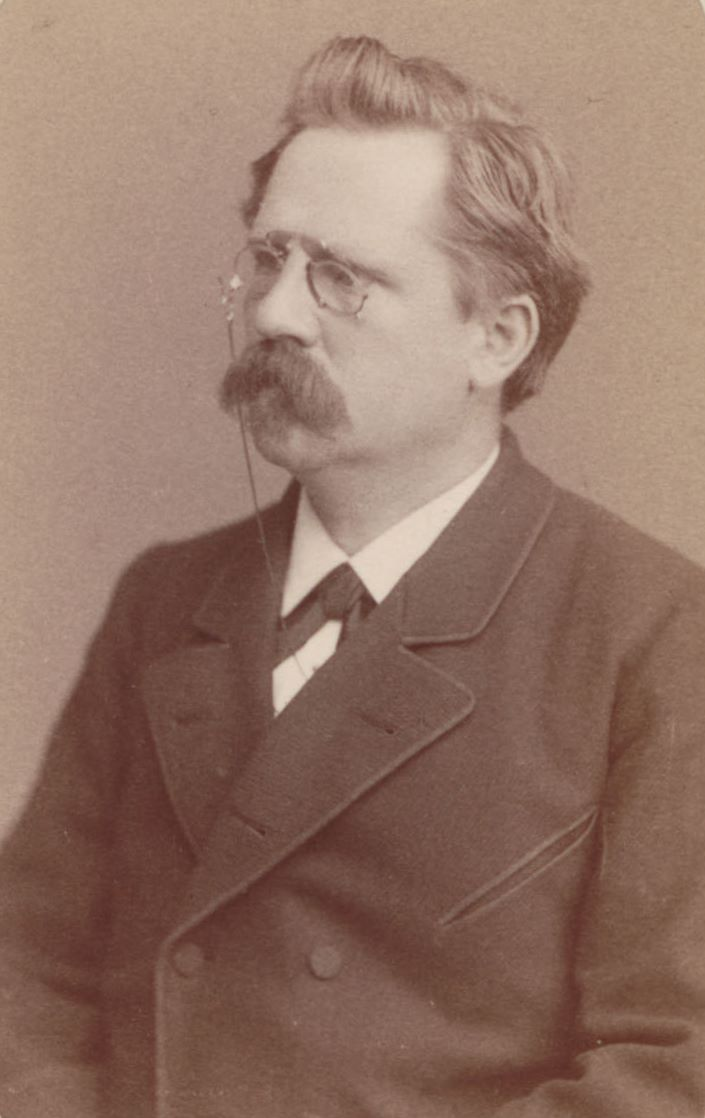
Paul Grützner (ca. 1885)

Paul Grützner (April 30, 1847 – July 29, 1919) was a German physiologist born in Festenberg, Silesia (present-day Twardogóra, Lower Silesian Voivodeship).

He studied medicine at the universities of Würzburg, Berlin and Breslau, where he was a pupil of Rudolf Heidenhain. After graduation, he was an assistant at the physiological institute in Breslau. In 1881, he became a professor at the University of Bern, and in 1884 succeeded Karl von Vierordt (1818–1884) at the physiological institute at the University of Tübingen.

Grützner performed numerous studies involving the physiology of nerves and muscles, circulatory physiology, glandular and gastric secretions, et al. In the 1870s, with Wilhelm Ebstein (1836–1912), he performed important research involving the physiochemical behavior of pepsin in the digestive tract. Findings from their research were published in an 1874 treatise called Ueber Pepsinbildung im Magen, and was included in Pflügers Archiv.

Grützner is credited with introducing a colorimetric method for determining the quantity of pepsin in a solution. Among his numerous written articles was an 1879 physiological study on voice and speech titled Physiologie der Stimme und Sprache.
