= Miodary, Lower Silesian Voivodeship =

Miodary
- Village
- Location within Poland
- Coordinates: 51°16′53″N 17°25′25″E
- Country: Poland
- Voivodeship: Lower Silesian
- County: Oleśnica
- Gmina: Dobroszyce
- Population: 119

Miodary [mjɔˈdarɨ] is a village in the administrative district of Gmina Dobroszyce, within Oleśnica County, Lower Silesian Voivodeship, in south-western Poland.
