= Będzin, Lower Silesian Voivodeship =

Będzin
- Village
- Location within Poland
- Coordinates: 51°26′46″N 17°29′42″E
- Country: Poland
- Voivodeship: Lower Silesian
- County: Oleśnica
- Gmina: Twardogóra

Będzin (Polish pronunciation: [ˈbɛɲd͡ʑin]) is a village in the administrative district of Gmina Twardogóra, within Oleśnica County, Lower Silesian Voivodeship, in south-western Poland.
