= Czwórka, Lower Silesian Voivodeship =

Czwórka
- Village
- Location within Poland
- Coordinates: 51°23′49″N 17°31′47″E
- Country: Poland
- Voivodeship: Lower Silesian
- County: Oleśnica
- Gmina: Twardogóra

Czwórka [ˈt͡ʂfurka] is a village in the administrative district of Gmina Twardogóra, within Oleśnica County, Lower Silesian Voivodeship, in south-western Poland.
