= Gmina Międzybórz =

Gmina Międzybórz Międzybórz Commune
- Gmina
- Coat of arms
- Interactive map of Gmina Międzybórz
- Coordinates (Międzybórz): 51°23′57″N 17°39′56″E
- Country: Poland
- Voivodeship: Lower Silesian
- County: Oleśnica
- Seat: Międzybórz
- Sołectwos: Bąków, Bukowina Sycowska, Dziesławice, Hałdrychowice, Kamień, Klonów, Kraszów, Królewska Wola, Ligota Rybińska, Niwki Kraszowskie, Niwki Książęce, Ose, Oska Piła

Area
  - Total: 88.62 km^{2} (34.22 sq mi)

Population (2019-06-30)
  - Total: 5,067
  - Density: 57.18/km^{2} (148.1/sq mi)
  - Urban: 2,341
  - Rural: 2,726
- Website: http://www.miedzyborz.pl/

Gmina Międzybórz is an urban-rural gmina (administrative district) in Oleśnica County, Lower Silesian Voivodeship, in south-western Poland. Its seat is the town of Międzybórz, which lies approximately 30 kilometres (19 mi) north-east of Oleśnica, and 54 kilometres (34 mi) north-east of the regional capital Wrocław. It is part of the Wrocław metropolitan area.

The gmina covers an area of 88.62 square kilometres (34.2 sq mi), and as of 2019 its total population is 5,067.

== Neighbouring gminas ==
Gmina Międzybórz is bordered by the gminas of Kobyla Góra, Sośnie, Syców and Twardogóra.

== Villages ==
Apart from the town of Międzybórz, the gmina contains the villages of Bąków, Bukowina Sycowska, Dziesławice, Hałdrychowice, Kamień, Klonów, Kraszów, Królewska Wola, Ligota Rybińska, Niwki Kraszowskie, Niwki Książęce, Ose and Oska Piła.
