= Nowica, Lower Silesian Voivodeship =

Nowica
- Village
- Location within Poland
- Coordinates: 51°16′16″N 17°21′56″E
- Country: Poland
- Voivodeship: Lower Silesian
- County: Oleśnica
- Gmina: Dobroszyce
- Population: 152

Nowica [nɔˈvit͡sa] is a village in the administrative district of Gmina Dobroszyce, within Oleśnica County, Lower Silesian Voivodeship, in south-western Poland.
