= Strzelce, Oleśnica County =

Strzelce
- Village
- Location within Poland
- Coordinates: 51°17′05″N 17°19′31″E
- Country: Poland
- Voivodeship: Lower Silesian
- County: Oleśnica
- Gmina: Dobroszyce

Population
  - Total: 480
- Time zone: UTC+1 (CET)
  - Summer (DST): UTC+2 (CEST)
- Vehicle registration: DOL

Strzelce [ˈstʂɛlt͡sɛ] is a village in the administrative district of Gmina Dobroszyce, within Oleśnica County, Lower Silesian Voivodeship, in south-western Poland.

== History ==
The name of the village is of Polish origin and comes from the old Polish word strzelec, which means "hunter" or "archer".

In 1885, the village had a population of 88.
