= Gmina Dobroszyce =

Gmina Dobroszyce Dobroszyce Commune
- Gmina
- Coat of arms
- Interactive map of Gmina Dobroszyce
- Coordinates (Dobroszyce): 51°15′53″N 17°20′21″E
- Country: Poland
- Voivodeship: Lower Silesian
- County: Oleśnica
- Seat: Dobroszyce
- Sołectwos: Bartków, Białe Błoto, Dobra, Dobroszyce, Dobrzeń, Łuczyna, Malerzów, Mękarzowice, Miodary, Nowica, Nowosiedlice, Sadków, Siekierowice, Strzelce

Area
  - Total: 131.74 km^{2} (50.87 sq mi)

Population (2019-06-30)
  - Total: 6,723
  - Density: 51.03/km^{2} (132.2/sq mi)
- Website: http://www.dobroszyce.pl

Gmina Dobroszyce is a rural gmina (administrative district) in Oleśnica County, Lower Silesian Voivodeship, in south-western Poland. Its seat is the village of Dobroszyce, which lies approximately 8 kilometres (5 mi) north-west of Oleśnica, and 26 kilometres (16 mi) north-east of the regional capital Wrocław.

The gmina covers an area of 131.74 square kilometres (50.9 sq mi), and as of 2019 its total population is 6,723. It is part of the larger Wrocław metropolitan area.

== Neighbouring gminas ==
Gmina Dobroszyce is bordered by the gminas of Długołęka, Krośnice, Oleśnica, Twardogóra and Zawonia.

== Villages ==
The gmina contains the villages of Bartków, Białe Błoto, Dobra, Dobroszyce, Dobrzeń, Łuczyna, Malerzów, Mękarzowice, Miodary, Nowica, Nowosiedlice, Sadków, Siekierowice and Strzelce.
