= Wesółka, Lower Silesian Voivodeship =

Wesółka
- Village
- Location within Poland
- Coordinates: 51°22′48″N 17°27′31″E
- Country: Poland
- Voivodeship: Lower Silesian
- County: Oleśnica
- Gmina: Twardogóra

Wesółka [vɛˈsuu̯ka] is a village in the administrative district of Gmina Twardogóra, within Oleśnica County, Lower Silesian Voivodeship, in south-western Poland.
