= Sadków, Oleśnica County =

Sadków
- Village
- Location within Poland
- Coordinates: 51°18′17″N 17°18′53″E
- Country: Poland
- Voivodeship: Lower Silesian
- County: Oleśnica
- Gmina: Dobroszyce
- Population: 291

Sadków [ˈsatkuf] is a village in the administrative district of Gmina Dobroszyce, within Oleśnica County, Lower Silesian Voivodeship, in south-western Poland.
