= Domasławice, Lower Silesian Voivodeship =

Domasławice
- Village
- Location within Poland
- Coordinates: 51°24′22″N 17°31′44″E
- Country: Poland
- Voivodeship: Lower Silesian
- County: Oleśnica
- Gmina: Twardogóra
- Area: 12.13 km^{2} (4.68 sq mi)
- Population (2011): 336
  - Density: 27.7/km^{2} (72/sq mi)
- Postal code: 56-416
- Vehicle registration: DOL

Domasławice [dɔmaswaˈvit͡sɛ] is a village in the administrative district of Gmina Twardogóra, within Oleśnica County, Lower Silesian Voivodeship, in south-western Poland.
