= Goszcz =

- Village
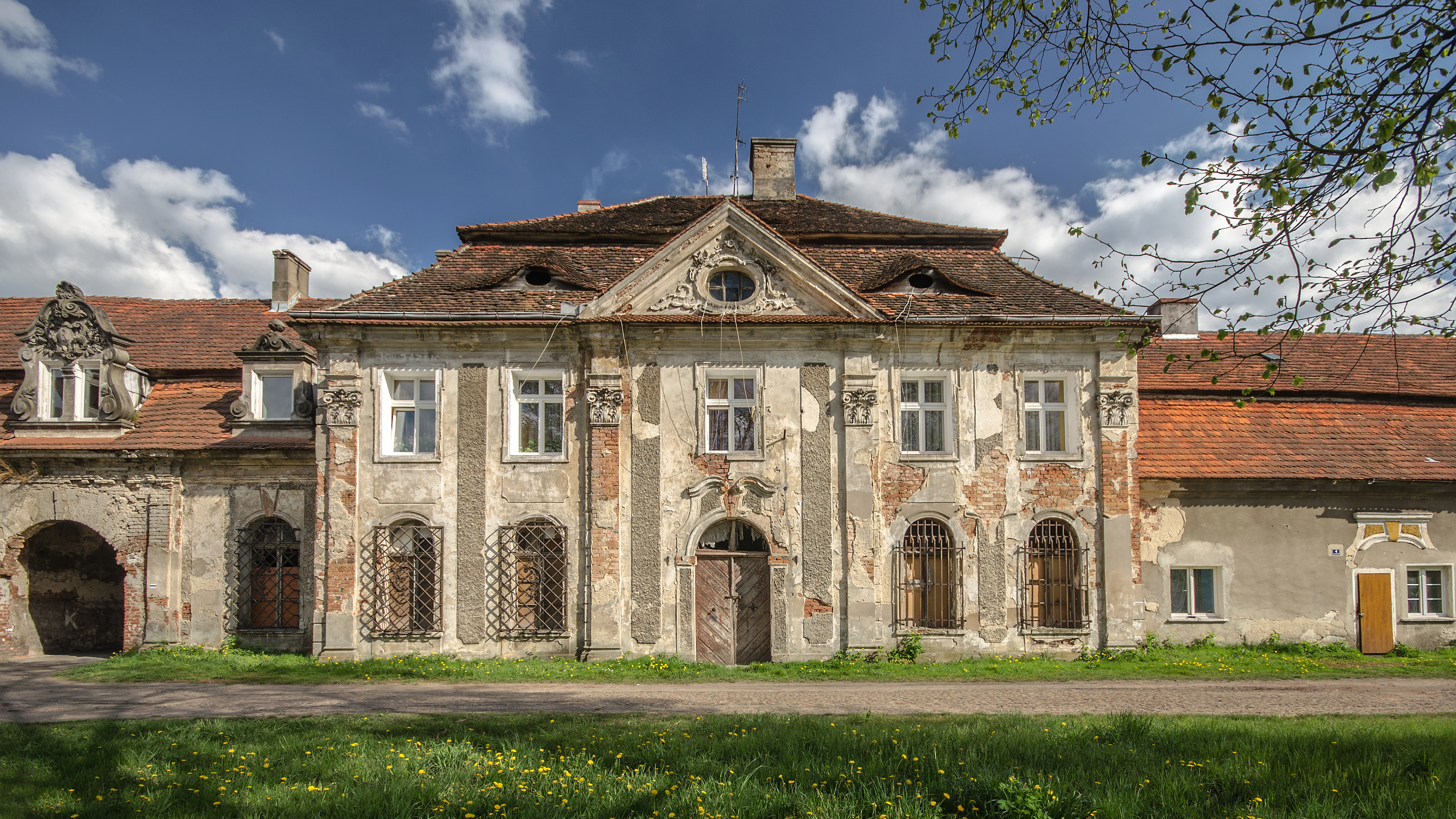
- Palace

- Location within Poland
- Coordinates: 51°23′50″N 17°28′38″E
- Country: Poland
- Voivodeship: Lower Silesian
- County: Oleśnica
- Gmina: Twardogóra
- Population: 940

Goszcz [ɡɔʂt͡ʂ] is a village in the administrative district of Gmina Twardogóra, within Oleśnica County, Lower Silesian Voivodeship, in south-western Poland.

== Gallery ==
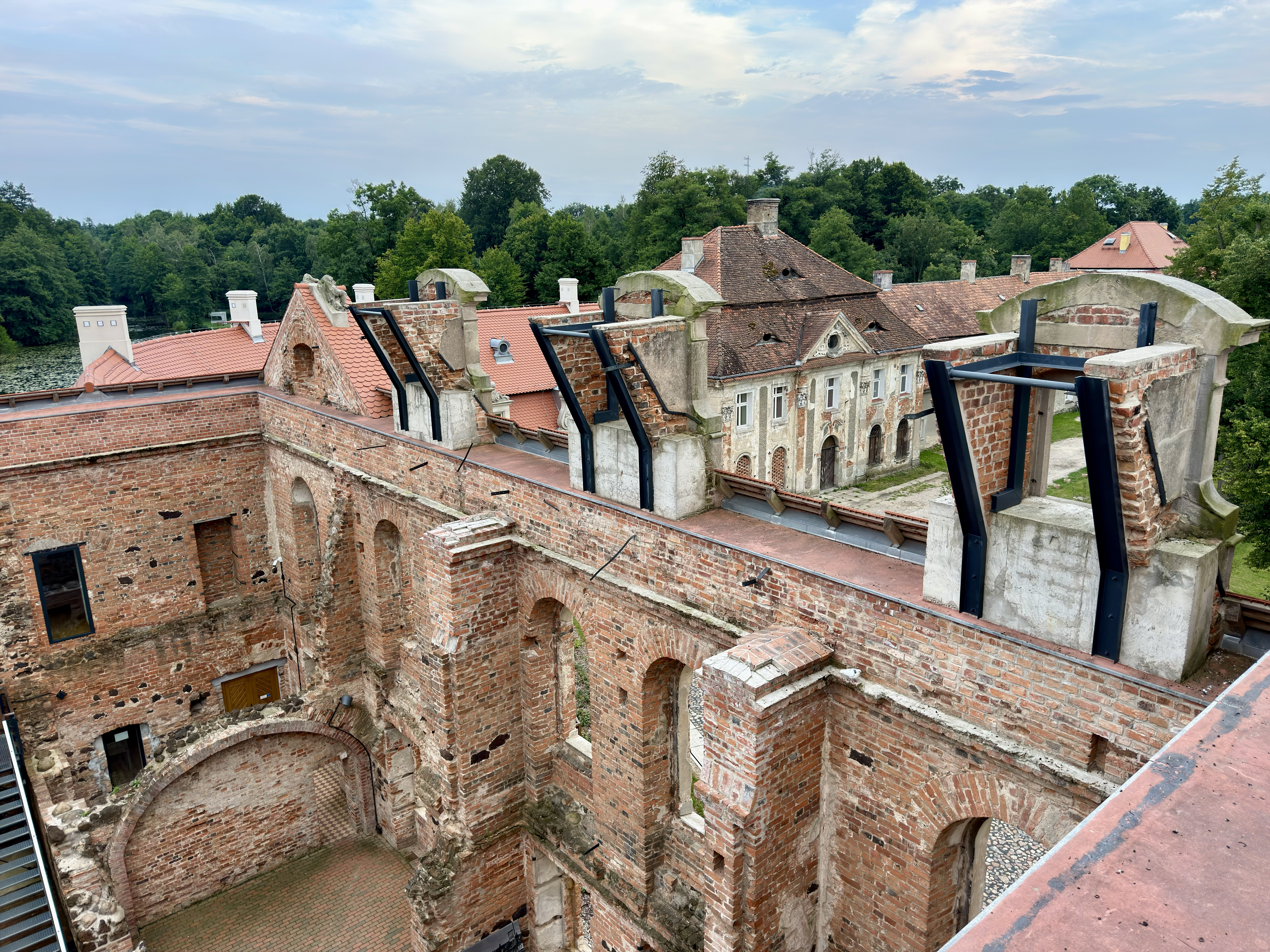
Palace

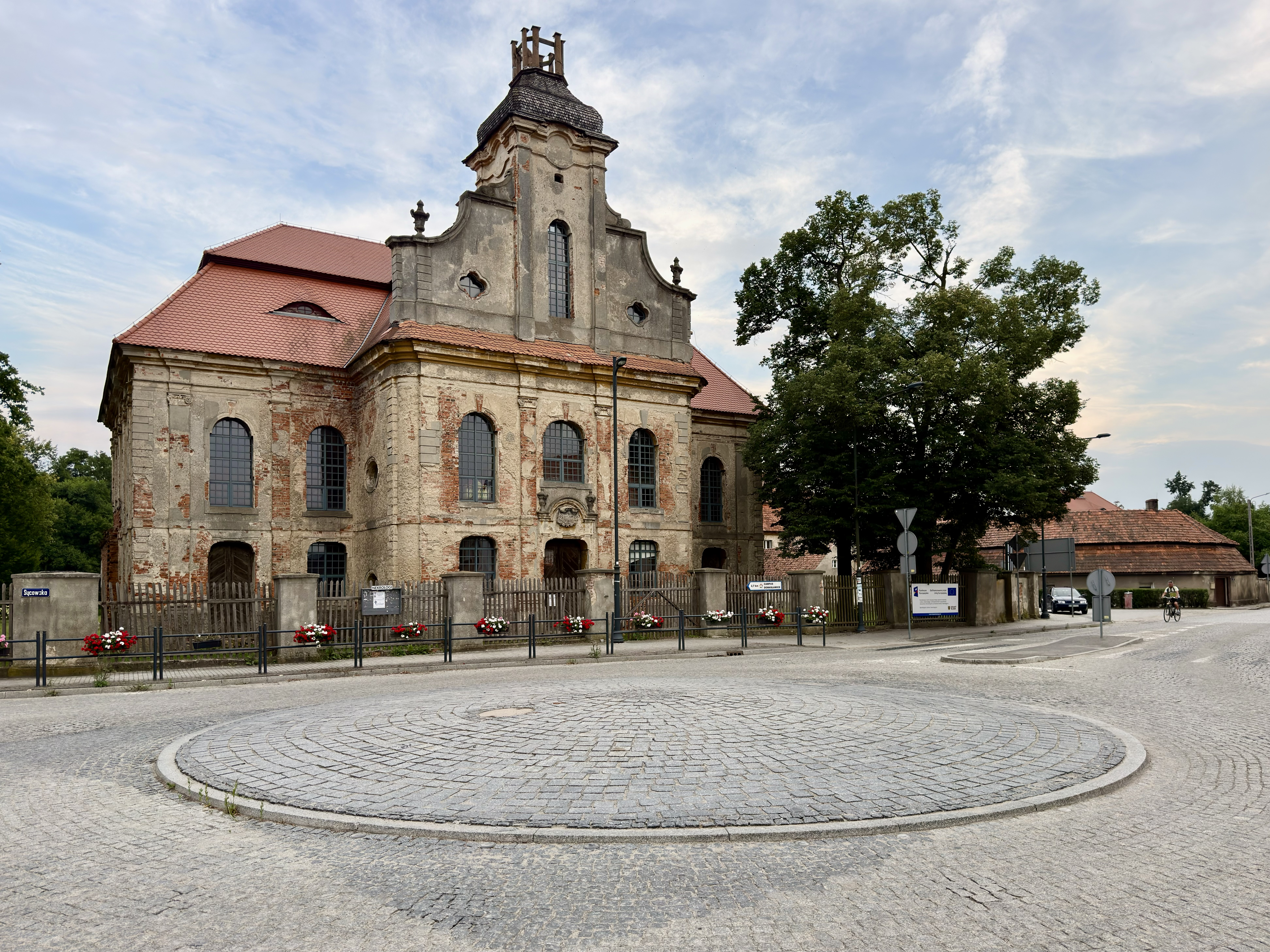
Evangelical Church

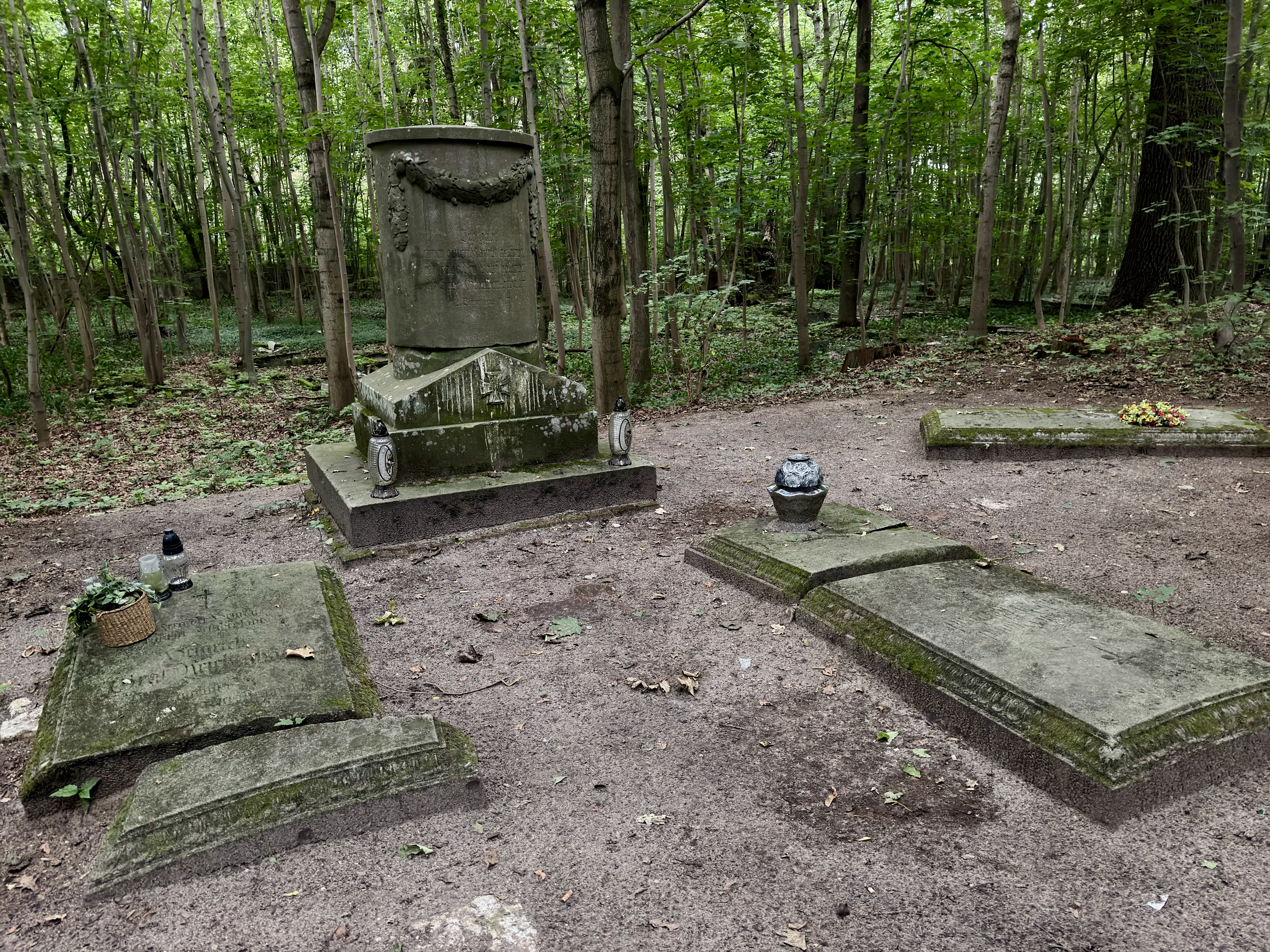
Evangelical cemetery
