= Martin Pohl (writer) =

Martin Pohl (28 March 1930 - 23 September 2007) was a German poet and playwright.

== Life ==
A merchant's son, he was born to a German family in Festenberg (then in Silesia but now known as Twardogóra in Poland). He was also a pupil of the Moravian Church, which shielded him from excessive Nazi influence. In 1945 when he was fifteen, he went to Berlin fleeing from the advancing Russian army in the last weeks of the war, during which his mother and younger brother died trapped in a building burnt by the SS. Breaking off a commercial apprenticeship, he became a trainee editor and assistant in the Neues Leben publishing house and in the Aufbau-Verlag.

In 1951, Pohl met Bertolt Brecht, who had opened a master class for dramaturges and directors at the GDR Academy of Arts. Pohl became one of Brecht's students and worked for a year and a half with the Berliner Ensemble. In February 1953, he was arrested accused of contacts with the American Counterintelligence Corps, and was sentenced to four years in prison. Brecht tried to intervene a few times on his behalf, and he was eventually released in 1954 for good behaviour. He went to West Berlin in 1955, there he took acting lessons and moved to Switzerland, where he staged his own plays as a member of a traveling theatre, acted onstage and directed plays by August Strindberg and Jean-Paul Sartre.

In 1972 Pohl returned to West Berlin, publishing poetry for the first time whilst there. He made a name for himself as an author of ballads, sonnets and ghaseles. In Berlin he resumed his theater work. He adapted the prose of the Polish author Bruno Schulz (“The Cinnamon Shops”) for Teatr Kreatur, a group headed by the painter and director Andrej Woron. Pohl died in Neubrandenburg and was buried in the cemetery in the Mecklenburg village of Groß Nemerow.

== Works ==
- Nah bei dir und mir. Gedichte. Edition Mariannenpresse, Berlin 1981. ISBN 3-922510-05-1.
- Memorial. Gedichte. Edition Mariannenpresse, Berlin 1986. ISBN 3-922510-34-5.
- Der Tod des Harlekin. Erzählung. Fehse, Berlin 1982.
- Ghaselen aus Twardogora. In: Jahresring. DVA, Stuttgart und in Sinn und Form. Berlin 1987.
- Gedichte 1950–1995. UVA, Berlin 1995.
- Nur ein Erinnern traumumflort. Federchen, Neubrandenburg 2002.
- In der Lederjacke Apolls, 29 Gedichte für Freunde. Privatdruck, 2002.
