= Gmina Twardogóra =

Gmina Twardogóra Twardogóra Commune
- Gmina
- Coat of arms
- Interactive map of Gmina Twardogóra
- Coordinates (Twardogóra): 51°21′53″N 17°28′11″E
- Country: Poland
- Voivodeship: Lower Silesian
- County: Oleśnica
- Seat: Twardogóra
- Sołectwos: Bukowinka, Chełstów, Chełstówek, Dąbrowa, Domasławice, Drągów, Drogoszowice, Droździęcin, Gola Wielka, Goszcz, Grabowno Małe, Grabowno Wielkie, Łazisko, Moszyce, Nowa Wieś Goszczańska, Olszówka, Sądrożyce, Sosnówka

Area
  - Total: 167.99 km^{2} (64.86 sq mi)

Population (2019-06-30)
  - Total: 13,008
  - Density: 77.433/km^{2} (200.55/sq mi)
  - Urban: 6,692
  - Rural: 6,316
- Website: https://www.twardogora.pl/

Gmina Twardogóra is an urban-rural gmina (administrative district) in Oleśnica County, Lower Silesian Voivodeship, in south-western Poland. Its seat is the town of Twardogóra, which lies approximately 20 kilometres (12 mi) north of Oleśnica, and 40 kilometres (25 mi) north-east of the regional capital Wrocław.

The gmina covers an area of 167.99 square kilometres (64.9 sq mi), and as of 2019 its total population is 13,008. It is part of the larger Wrocław metropolitan area.

== Neighbouring gminas ==
Gmina Twardogóra is bordered by the gminas of Dobroszyce, Krośnice, Międzybórz, Oleśnica, Sośnie and Syców.

== Villages ==
Apart from the town of Twardogóra, the gmina contains the villages of Będzin, Brodowce, Brzezina, Bukowinka, Chełstów, Chełstówek, Cztery Chałupy, Czwórka, Dąbrowa, Domasławice, Drągów, Drągówek, Drogoszowice, Droździęcin, Gola Mała, Gola Wielka, Goszcz, Grabek, Grabowno Małe, Grabowno Wielkie, Jezioro, Kolonia, Kuźnia Goszczańska, Kuźnica Goszczańska, Łazisko, Lorki-Kolonia, Moszyce, Nowa Wieś Goszczańska, Olszówka, Pajęczak, Poręby, Pustkowie, Sądrożyce, Sosnówka, Świniary, Szczodrak, Troska, Trzy Chałupy, Wesółka and Zakrzów.
