= Oleśnica County =

Coordinates: 51°12′N 17°23′E

Oleśnica County Powiat oleśnicki
- County
- Flag Coat of arms

- Location within the voivodeship
- Country: Poland
- Voivodeship: Lower Silesian
- Seat: Oleśnica
- Gminas: Total 8 (incl. 1 urban): Oleśnica; Gmina Bierutów; Gmina Dobroszyce; Gmina Dziadowa Kłoda; Gmina Międzybórz; Gmina Oleśnica; Gmina Syców; Gmina Twardogóra

Area
  - Total: 1,049.74 km^{2} (405.31 sq mi)

Population (2019-06-30)
  - Total: 107,090
  - Density: 102.02/km^{2} (264.22/sq mi)
  - Urban: 61,466
  - Rural: 45,624
- Car plates: DOL
- Website: www.powiat-olesnicki.pl

Oleśnica County (Polish: powiat oleśnicki) is a unit of territorial administration and local government (powiat) in Lower Silesian Voivodeship, south-western Poland. It was created on January 1, 1999, as a result of the Polish local government reforms passed in 1998. The county covers an area of 1,049.7 square kilometres (405.3 sq mi). Its administrative seat is the town of Oleśnica, and it also contains the towns of Syców, Twardogóra, Bierutów and Międzybórz.

As of 2019 the total population of the county is 107,090. The most populated towns are Oleśnica with 37,169 inhabitants and Syców is 10,397 inhabitants.

== Neighbouring counties ==
Oleśnica County is bordered by Milicz County and Ostrów County to the north, Ostrzeszów County, Kępno County and Namysłów County to the east, Oława County to the south, and Wrocław County and Trzebnica County to the west.

== Administrative divisions ==
The county is subdivided into eight gminas (one urban, four urban-rural and three rural). These are listed in the following table, in descending order of population.

Gmina	Type	Area (km^{2})	Population (2019)	Seat
Oleśnica	urban	21.0	37,169	
Gmina Syców	urban-rural	144.8	16,874	Syców
Gmina Oleśnica	rural	243.4	13,689	Oleśnica*
Gmina Twardogóra	urban-rural	168.0	13,008	Twardogóra
Gmina Bierutów	urban-rural	147.1	9,963	Bierutów
Gmina Dobroszyce	rural	131.7	6,723	Dobroszyce
Gmina Międzybórz	urban-rural	88.6	5,067	Międzybórz
Gmina Dziadowa Kłoda	rural	105.1	4,597	Dziadowa Kłoda
* seat not part of the gmina
