= Wielowieś =

Wielowieś may refer to the following places in Poland:

- Wielowieś, Krotoszyn County in Greater Poland Voivodeship (west-central Poland)
- Wielowieś, Międzychód County in Greater Poland Voivodeship (west-central Poland)
- Wielowieś, Gmina Sieroszewice, Ostrów County in Greater Poland Voivodeship (west-central Poland)
- Wielowieś, Gmina Pakość in Kuyavian-Pomeranian Voivodeship (north-central Poland)
- Wielowieś, Lubin County in Lower Silesian Voivodeship (south-west Poland)
- Wielowieś, Oleśnica County in Lower Silesian Voivodeship (south-west Poland)
- Wielowieś, Silesian Voivodeship (south Poland)
- Wielowieś, Lubusz Voivodeship (west Poland)
- Wielowieś, Warmian-Masurian Voivodeship (north Poland)
- Wielowieś, Tarnobrzeg in Podkarpackie Voivodeship (south Poland)
