= Działosza =

Działosza may refer to the following places in Poland:

- Działosza in Gmina Syców, Oleśnica County in Lower Silesian Voivodeship (SW Poland)
- Other places called Działosza (listed in Polish Wikipedia)

See also:

- Działosza coat of arms
