= Polomarket =

Polish grocery chain

Polomarket Sp. z o.o.
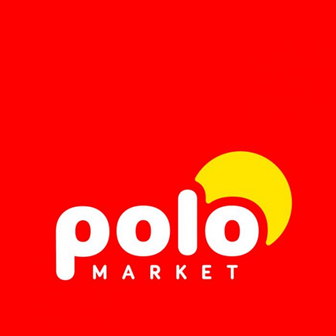
- Company type: Sp. z o.o.
- Industry: Retail
- Founded: 1997; 29 years ago
- Headquarters: Giebnia, Poland
- Number of locations: 280
- Area served: Poland
- Revenue: zl 2.41 billion (2016)
- Number of employees: 7,000 (2017)
- Website: www.polomarket.pl

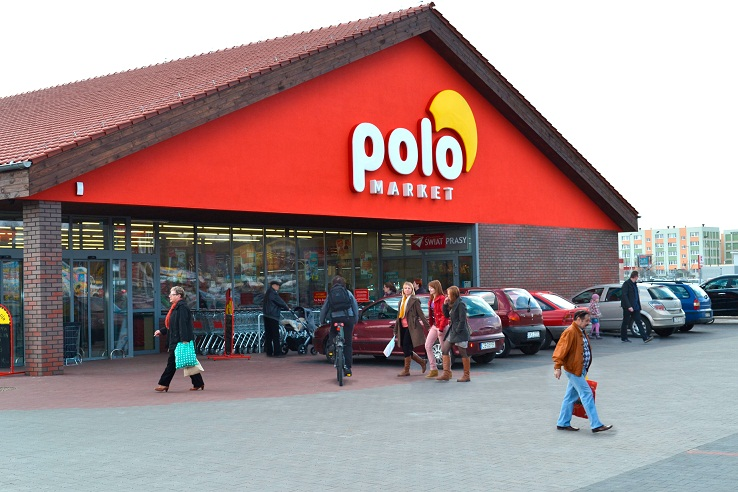
A Polomarket location in Bydgoszcz

Polomarket Sp. z o.o. (stylised as POLOmarket) is a retail chain of grocery stores, operating around 290 stores nationally around Poland. Every month, Polomarket stores are visited by nearly 8.5 million customers.

The Polomarket headquarters and logistics centre is located in Giebnia near Pakość, Kuyavian-Pomeranian Voivodeship. The second warehouse is located in Kłobuck.

The retail chain's slogan is My favourite (Mój ulubiony).

== Structure ==
The Polomarket retail chain functions as a private limited company (Sp. z o.o.). The company was founded in 1997 with the merger of 27 stores owned by five owners from Konin, Inowrocław, Świecie, Toruń and Płock. The firm is 100% owned by Polish capital.

In 2013, the retail chain changed its logo, interior as well as the stores' layout. Since the transformation, Polomarket continues to renovate older stores, whilst all newly opened retail stores are embodied within the retail chain's branding.

By the end of 2014, 170 stores left the Polish market under the Polomarket branding. These were replaced by Mila, owned by the joint-stock company Market-Detal, which was a partner of Polomarket between 1997 and 2014.

In 2016, the retail chain's revenue numbered 2.41 billion zlotys. In 2017, the retail chain opened up ten new stores. The retail chain employs around seven-thousand people.

== Gallery ==
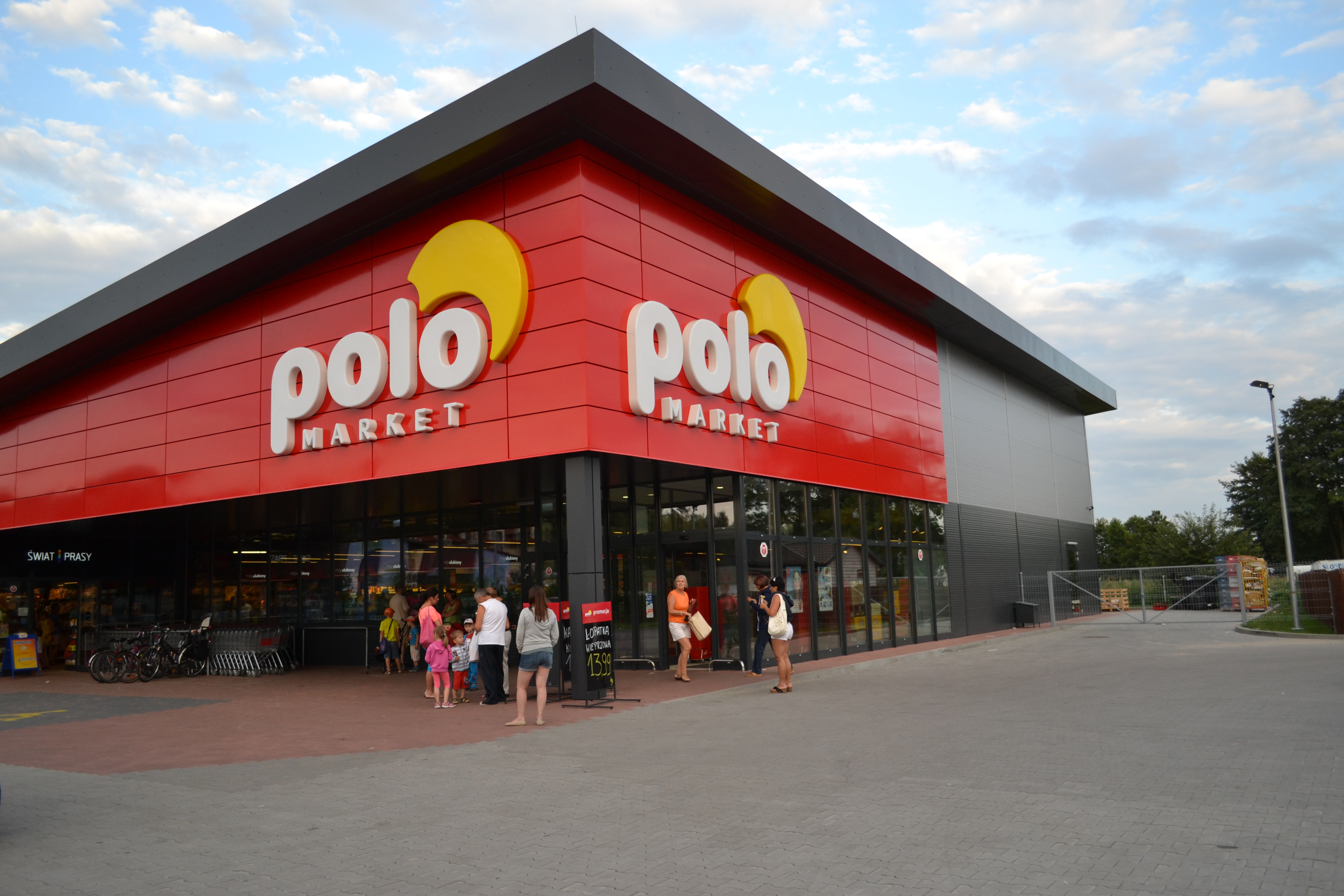
Polomarket in Dąbki.

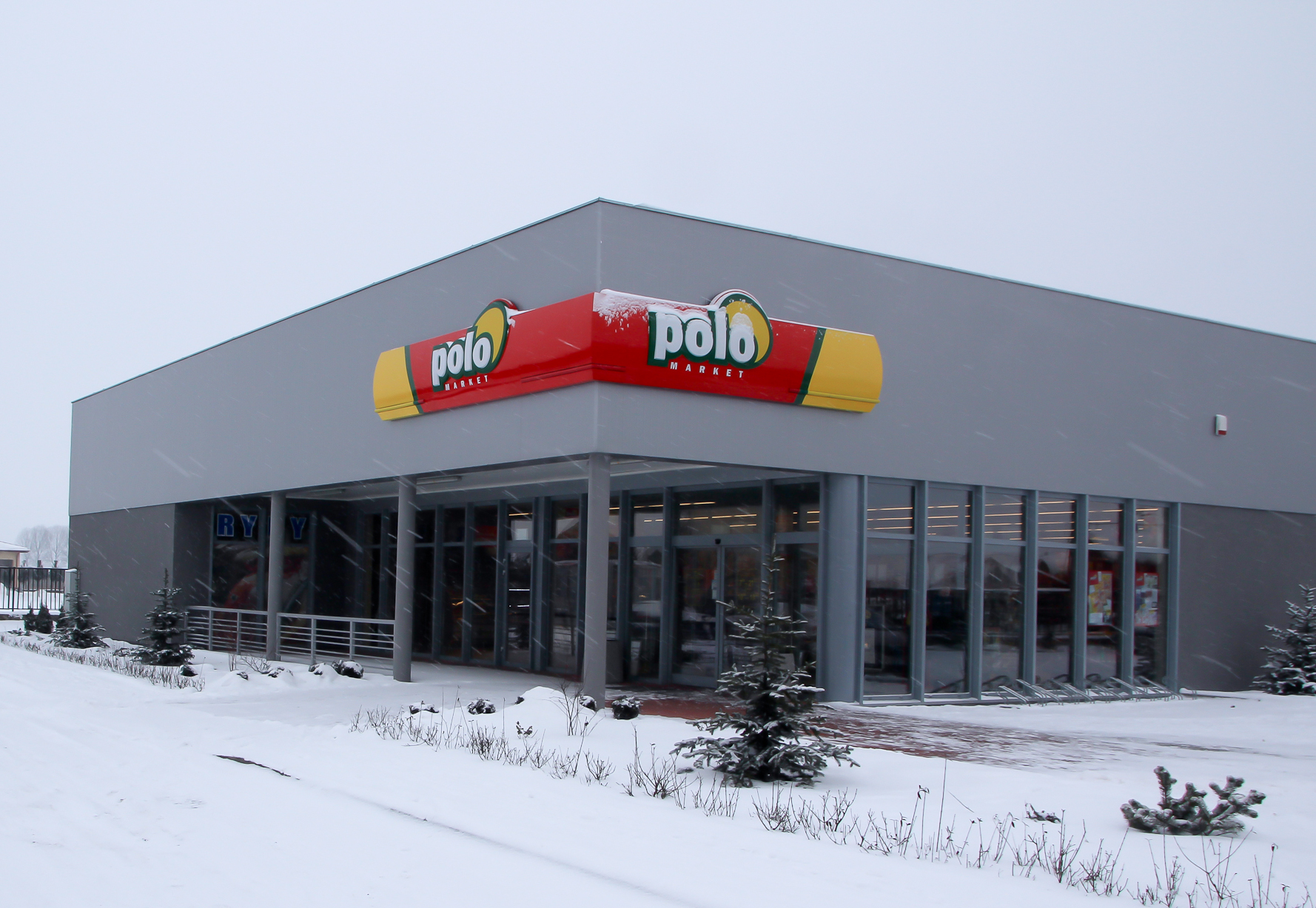
Polomarket in Święciechowa.

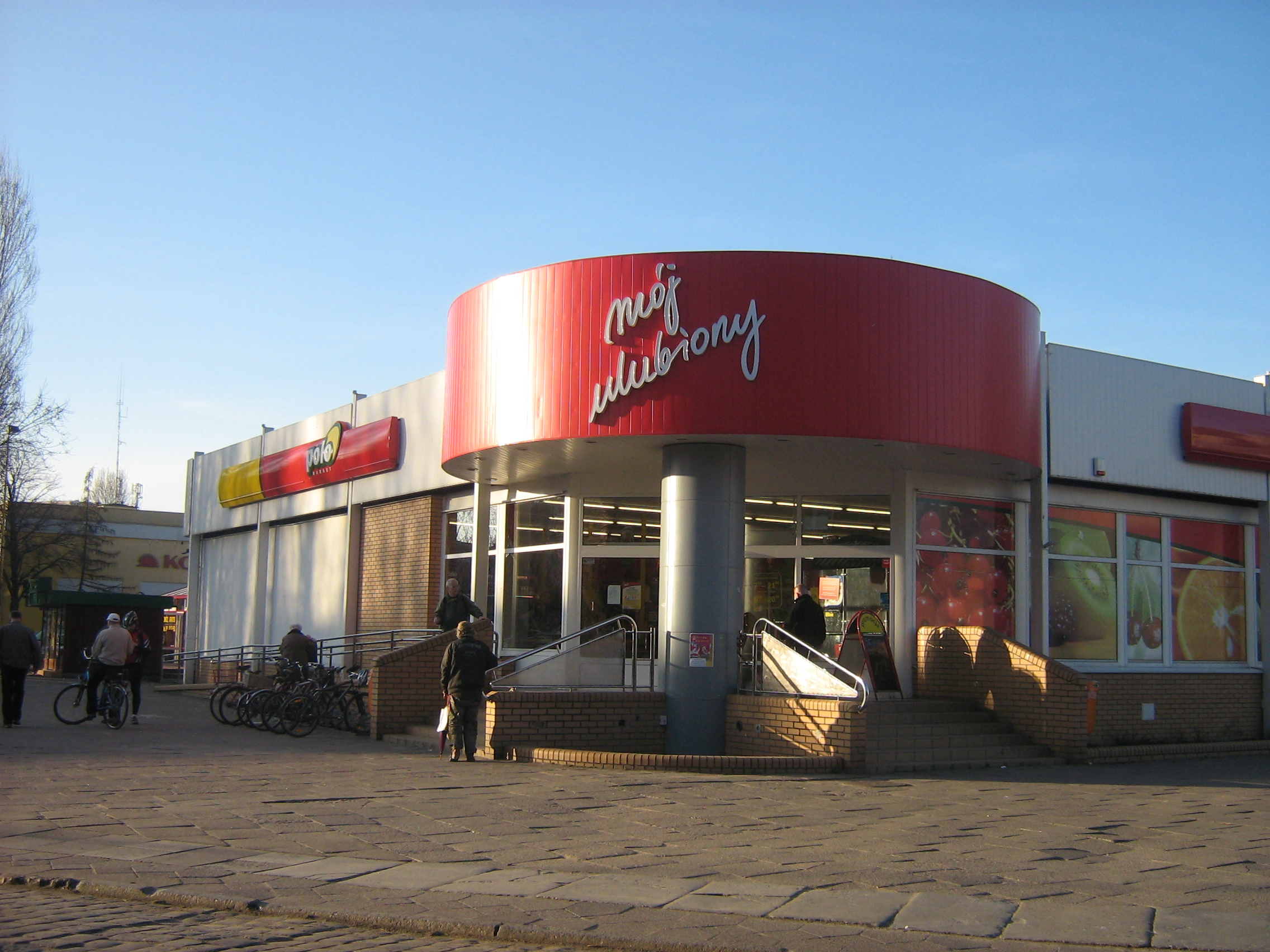
Polomarket in Świnoujście.

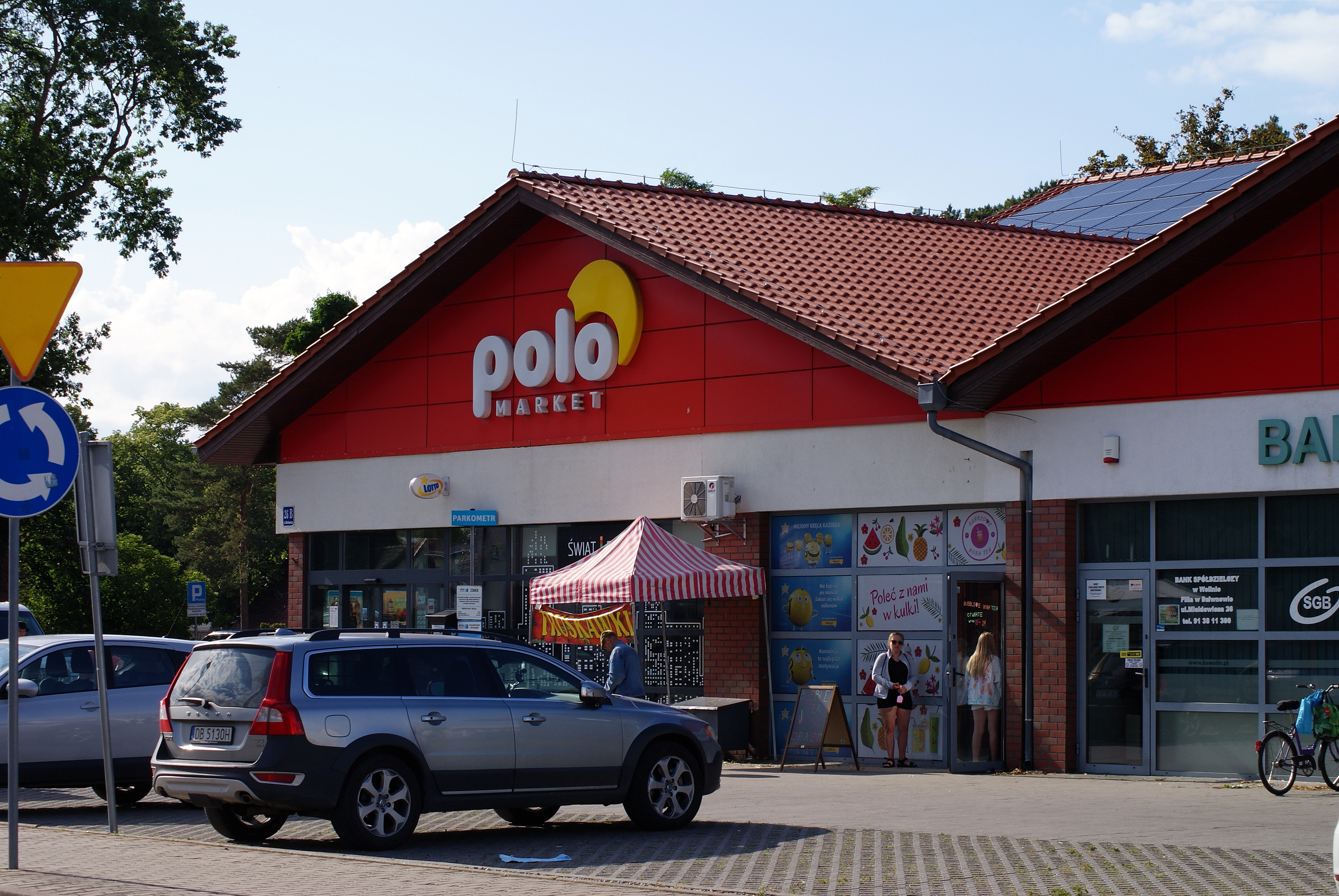
Polomarket in Dziwnów.

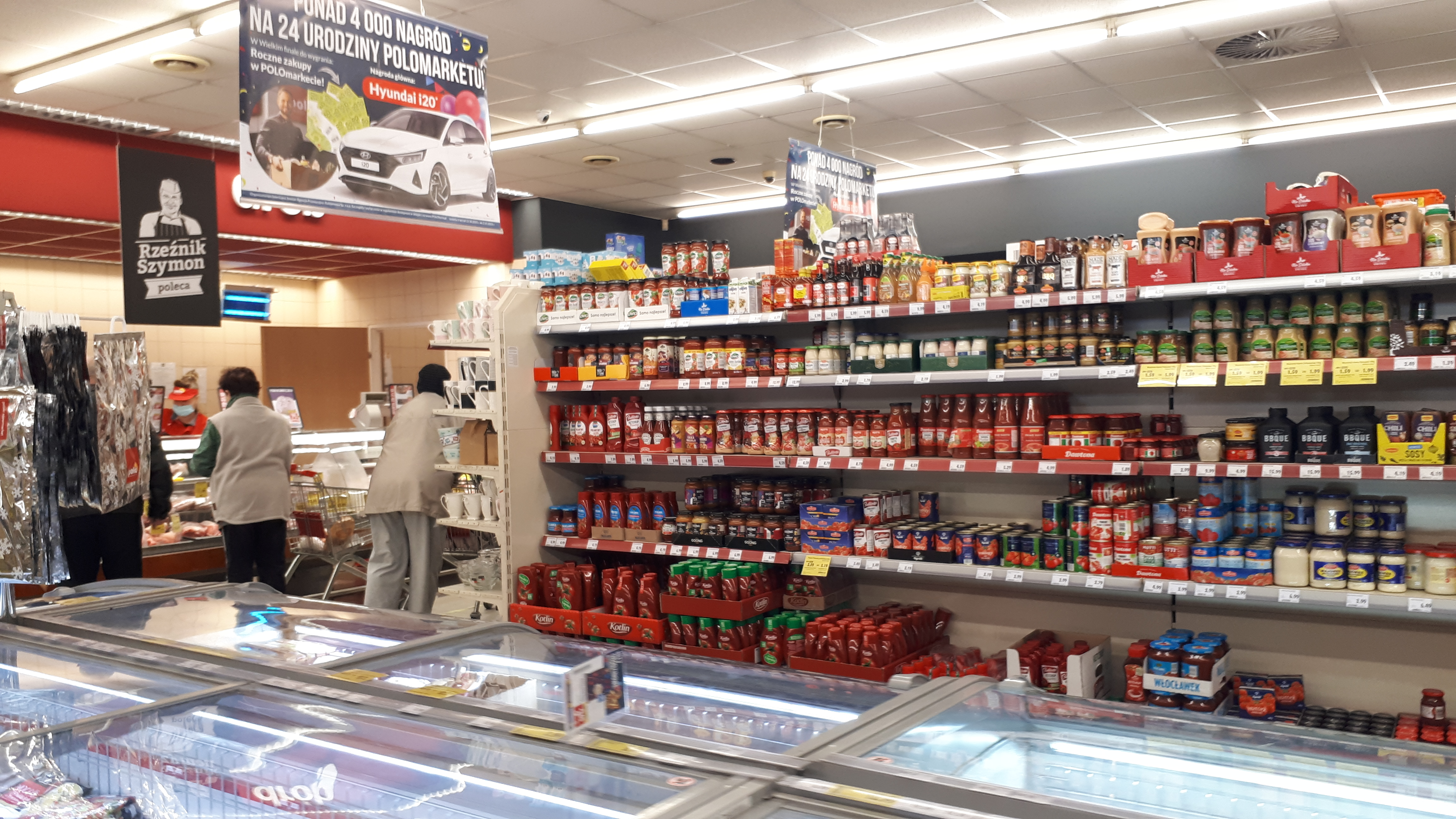
Interior of Polomarket in Augustów
