= Rycerzewko =

Rycerzewko may refer to:

- Rycerzewko, Kuyavian-Pomeranian Voivodeship, Poland
- Rycerzewko, West Pomeranian Voivodeship, a village in Gmina Świdwin, Poland

== See also ==
- Rycerzewo (disambiguation)
