= Gaszowice =

Gaszowice may refer to the following villages in Poland:

- Gaszowice in Rybnik County, Silesian Voivodeship (S Poland)
- Gaszowice in Oleśnica County, Lower Silesian Voivodeship (SW Poland)
