= Rycerzewo =

Rycerzewo may refer to:

- Rycerzewo, Kuyavian-Pomeranian Voivodeship, a village in the Gmina Pakość, Inowrocław County, Poland
- Rycerzewo, Warmian-Masurian Voivodeship, a settlement in the Gmina Miłakowo, Ostróda County, Poland

== See also ==
- Rycerzewko (disambiguation)
