= Kościelec, Kuyavian-Pomeranian Voivodeship =

Kościelec
- Village
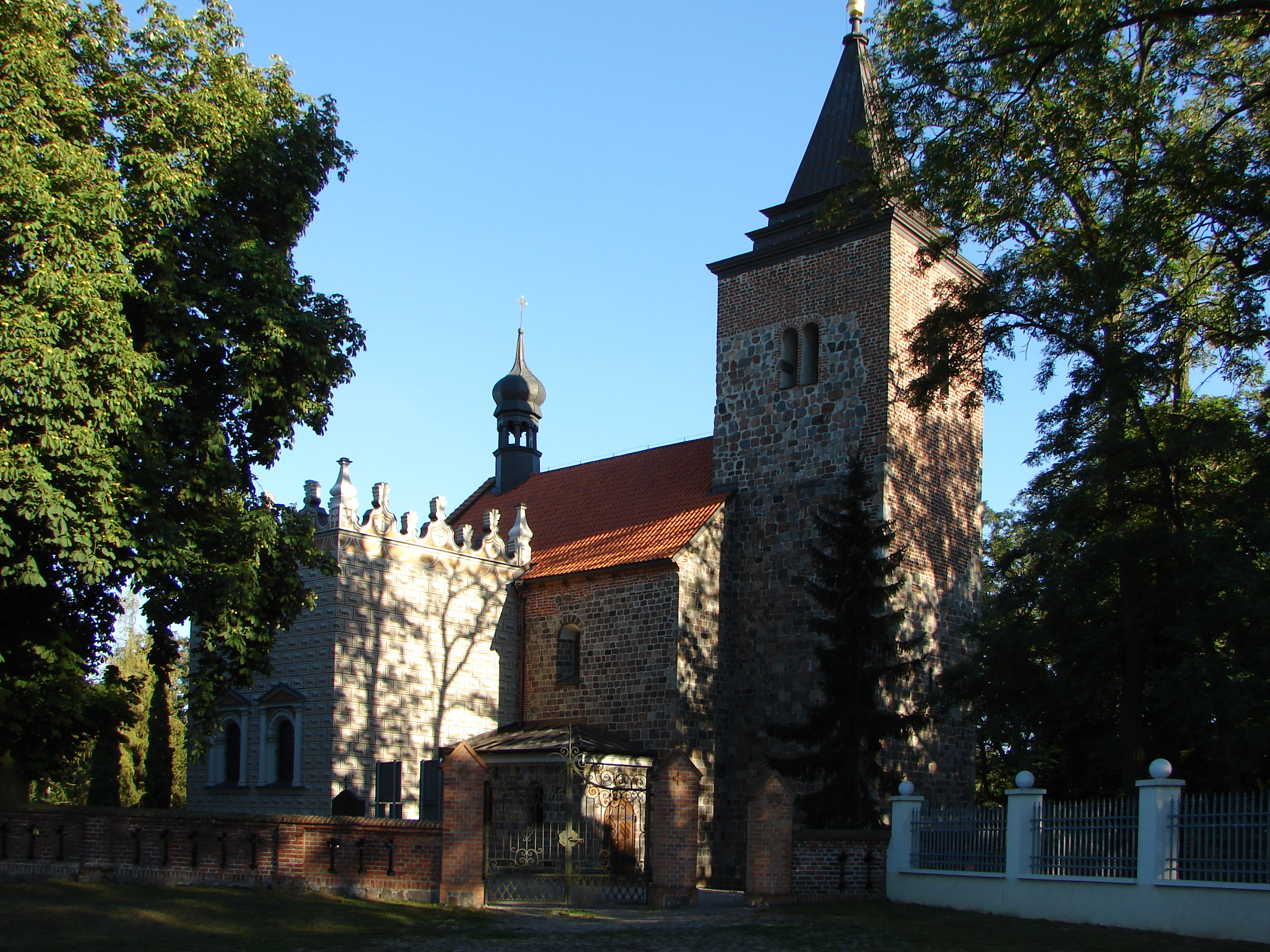
- Church of Saint Margaret. Was built in the 12th century.

- Location within Poland
- Coordinates: 52°47′38″N 18°9′26″E
- Country: Poland
- Voivodeship: Kuyavian-Pomeranian
- County: Inowrocław
- Gmina: Pakość
- Population: 680

Kościelec [kɔɕˈt͡ɕɛlɛt͡s] is a village in the administrative district of Gmina Pakość, within Inowrocław County, Kuyavian-Pomeranian Voivodeship, in north-central Poland.
