= Łącko, Kuyavian-Pomeranian Voivodeship =

Łącko
- Village
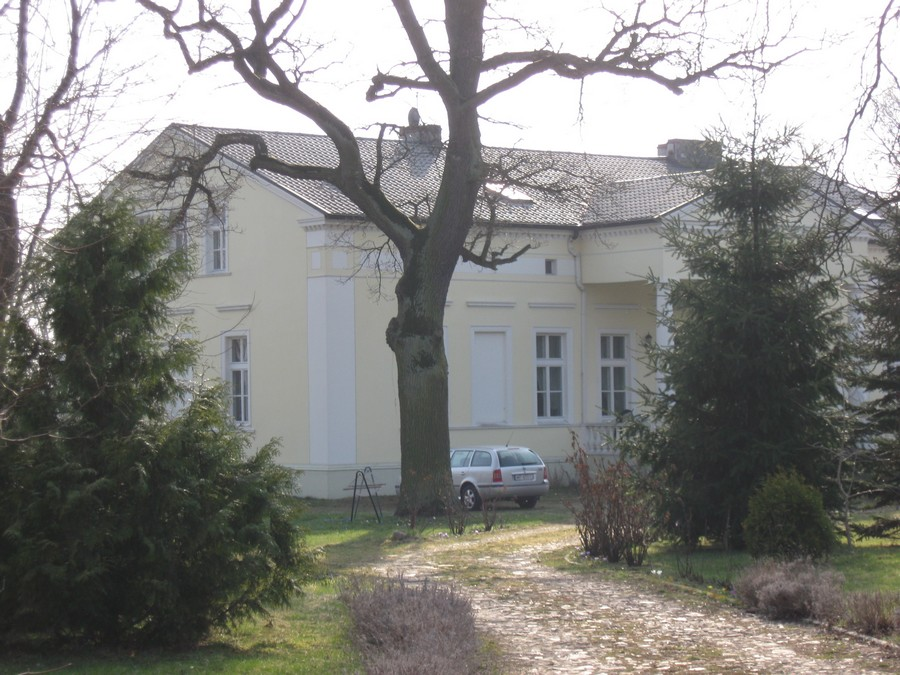

- Location within Poland
- Coordinates: 52°50′08″N 18°06′12″E
- Country: Poland
- Voivodeship: Kuyavian-Pomeranian
- County: Inowrocław
- Gmina: Pakość

Łącko [ˈwɔnt͡skɔ] is a village in the administrative district of Gmina Pakość, within Inowrocław County, Kuyavian-Pomeranian Voivodeship, in north-central Poland.
