= Wojciechowo Wielkie =

- Village
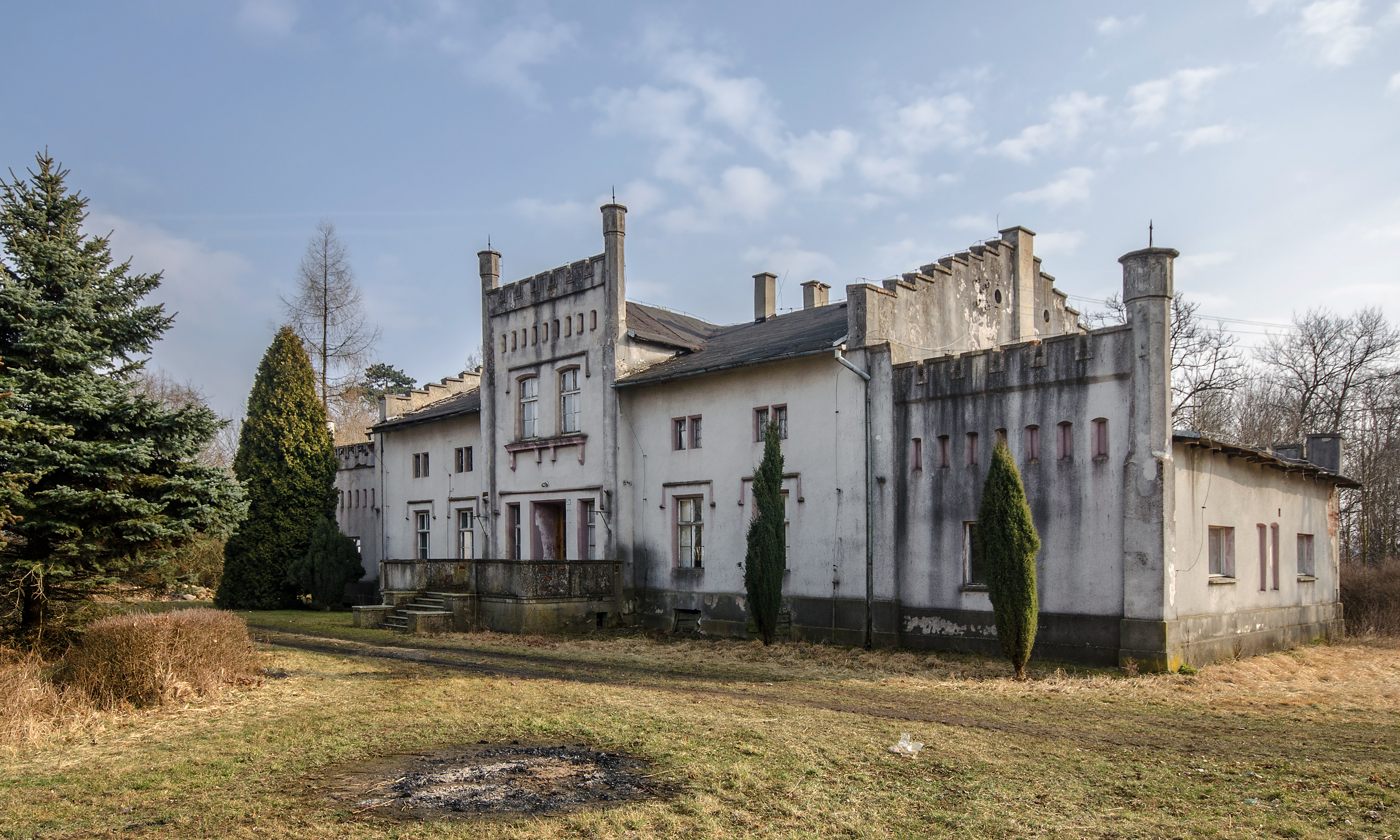
- Old manor house in Wojciechowo Wielkie

- Location within Poland
- Coordinates: 51°18′38″N 17°36′21″E
- Country: Poland
- Voivodeship: Lower Silesian
- County: Oleśnica
- Gmina: Syców
- Population: 220
- Time zone: UTC+1 (CET)
  - Summer (DST): UTC+2 (CEST)
- Vehicle registration: DOL

Wojciechowo Wielkie (Polish pronunciation: [vɔjt͡ɕɛˈxɔvɔ ˈvjɛlkʲɛ]) is a village in the administrative district of Gmina Syców, within Oleśnica County, Lower Silesian Voivodeship, in south-western Poland.

The S8 highway passes nearby, south of Wojciechowo Wielkie.
