= Ludkowo =

- Village
- Location within Poland
- Coordinates: 52°49′1″N 18°4′32″E
- Country: Poland
- Voivodeship: Kuyavian-Pomeranian
- County: Inowrocław
- Gmina: Pakość

Ludkowo [lutˈkɔvɔ] is a village in the administrative district of Gmina Pakość, within Inowrocław County, Kuyavian-Pomeranian Voivodeship, in north-central Poland.
