= Mielno, Inowrocław County =

Mielno
- Village
- Location within Poland
- Coordinates: 52°50′19″N 18°4′45″E
- Country: Poland
- Voivodeship: Kuyavian-Pomeranian
- County: Inowrocław
- Gmina: Pakość
- Population: 40

Mielno [ˈmjɛlnɔ] is a village in the administrative district of Gmina Pakość, within Inowrocław County, Kuyavian-Pomeranian Voivodeship, in north-central Poland.
