= Adam Abraham von Gaffron und Oberstradam =

Adam Abraham von Gaffron und Oberstradam (11 October 1665 – 11 May 1738) was a member of the Silesian ancient noble family, Gaffron.

== Service in the Life Guards ==
In 1683, von Gaffron joined the Danish Life Guards. Between 1689 and 1691, he accompanied the Hjaelpetropperne and Nederlanderne battalions to Ireland. He was wounded at the Battle of Steenkerke in 1692, and in the battle at Helsingborg in 1710. In the 1713 campaign in North Germany he proved a brave and skilful commander. In 1717 he commanded reinforcements sent to Norway. With the death of Charles XII of Sweden on 30 November 1718, he was directed to Röros to block the way for Army Corps under Lieutenant General Carl Gustaf Armfeldt on their retreat back to Sweden. In the summer of 1719 he became the Commander of the so-called "smaalenske 'Corps, which advanced into Swedish Bohuslan.

== Promotions ==
- Second Lieutenant, 1690
- Lieutenant, 1692
- Kaptajnlöjtnant (Junior Captain) 1696
- Kaptajn (Captain) 1697
- Major of the Granaderkorps (Grenadier Corps)
- “Karakteriseret“ Colonel, 1706
- Colonel of the third Danish regiment of the Imperial Service (Austria), 1707
- Head of the Royal Danish Marine Corps, 1707
- Commander of the Grenadier Corps, 1710
- Major-General, 1712
- Commander of Norway, 1719
- Commander of the Danish Nyborg Castle, 1720.

== Post-military career ==
Gaffron formed a good relationship with the burghers of Nyborg and was appointed to Lieutenant General in 1734. In the same year he was appointed by Frederik IV King of Denmark to be Governor of the Danish Island Fyn. He was awarded the Danish collar of the order of Dannebrogen in 1730.

== Family life ==
Gaffron married Christine Charlotte Trolle (1685–1760), daughter of the Minister of State Herluf Trolle of Snedinge. They had eight children of which two sons both became officers in the Danish service. One of his sons, Balle Marimilian, returned to Silesia after inheriting the Castle of Haltauf and Kunern from his aunt.

He died in 1738 and was buried in Noble Chapel of the Vor Frue Church in Nyborg on 23 June 1738.

== Other links ==
- https://www.ggo.se (The GGO Foundation, Gawron-Gaffron-Oberstradam)
