= Węgierce, Kuyavian-Pomeranian Voivodeship =

Węgierce
- Village
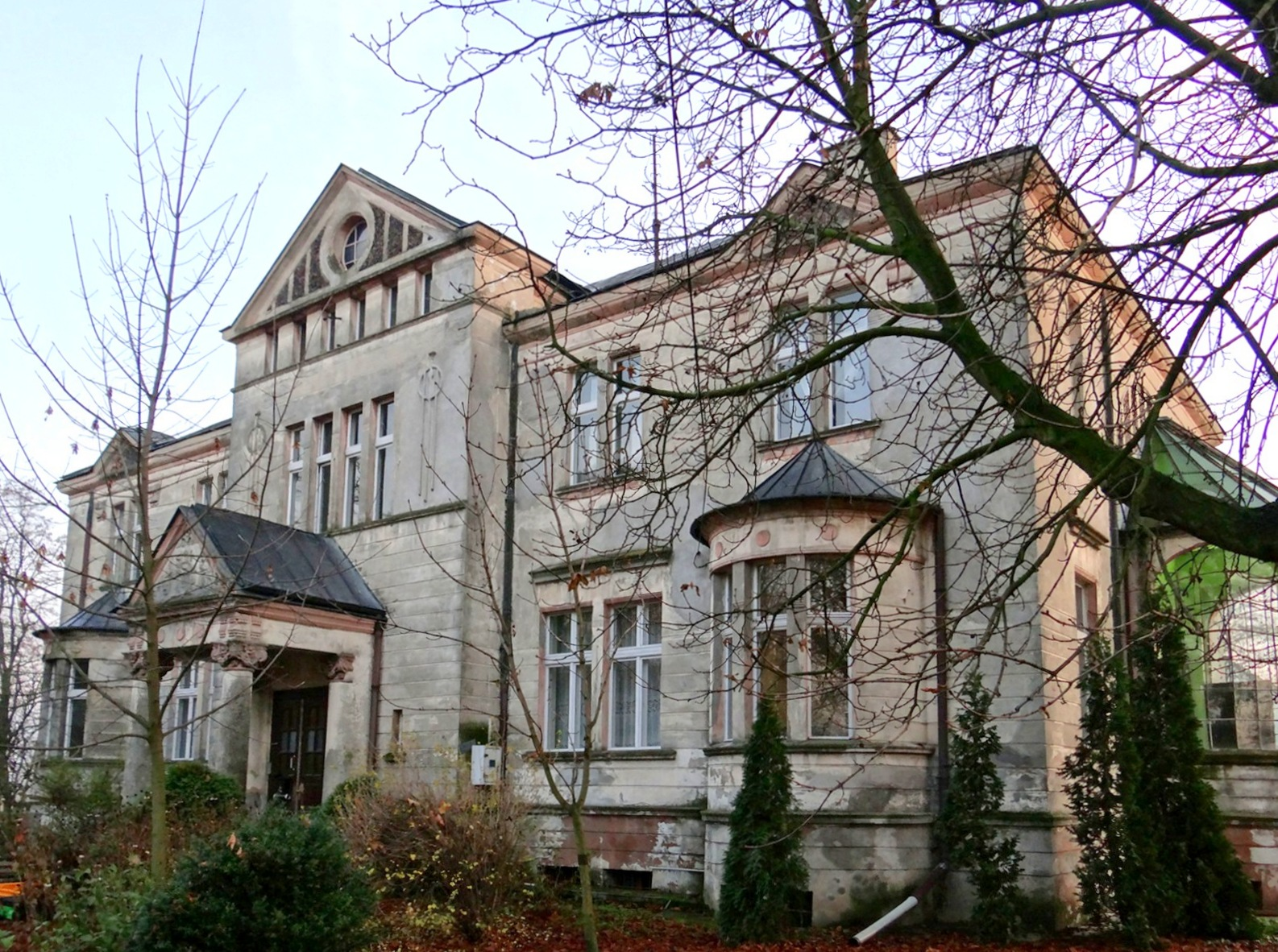
- Dembiński Palace

- Location within Poland
- Coordinates: 52°46′N 18°9′E
- Country: Poland
- Voivodeship: Kuyavian-Pomeranian
- County: Inowrocław
- Gmina: Pakość
- Time zone: UTC+1 (CET)
  - Summer (DST): UTC+2 (CEST)
- Vehicle registration: CIN

Węgierce [vɛŋˈɡʲɛrt͡sɛ] is a village in the administrative district of Gmina Pakość, within Inowrocław County, Kuyavian-Pomeranian Voivodeship, in north-central Poland.
