= Gorzany =

- Village
- Location within Poland
- Coordinates: 52°47′N 18°9′E
- Country: Poland
- Voivodeship: Kuyavian-Pomeranian
- County: Inowrocław
- Gmina: Pakość

Gorzany [ɡɔˈʐanɨ] is a village in the administrative district of Gmina Pakość, within Inowrocław County, Kuyavian-Pomeranian Voivodeship, in north-central Poland.
