= Dziarnowo, Kuyavian-Pomeranian Voivodeship =

Dziarnowo
- Village
- Location within Poland
- Coordinates: 52°46′44″N 18°10′47″E
- Country: Poland
- Voivodeship: Kuyavian-Pomeranian
- County: Inowrocław
- Gmina: Pakość

Dziarnowo [d͡ʑarˈnɔvɔ] is a village in the administrative district of Gmina Pakość, within Inowrocław County, Kuyavian-Pomeranian Voivodeship, in north-central Poland.
