= Ślizów =

- Village
- Location within Poland
- Coordinates: 51°16′N 17°43′E
- Country: Poland
- Voivodeship: Lower Silesian
- County: Oleśnica
- Gmina: Syców
- Time zone: UTC+1 (CET)
  - Summer (DST): UTC+2 (CEST)
- Vehicle registration: DOL

Ślizów ([ˈɕlʲizuf]) (German: Schleise) is a village in the administrative district of Gmina Syców, within Oleśnica County, Lower Silesian Voivodeship, in southern Poland.

The name of the village is of Polish origin and comes from the word śliz, which means "stone loach".
