= Stradomia Wierzchnia =

- Village
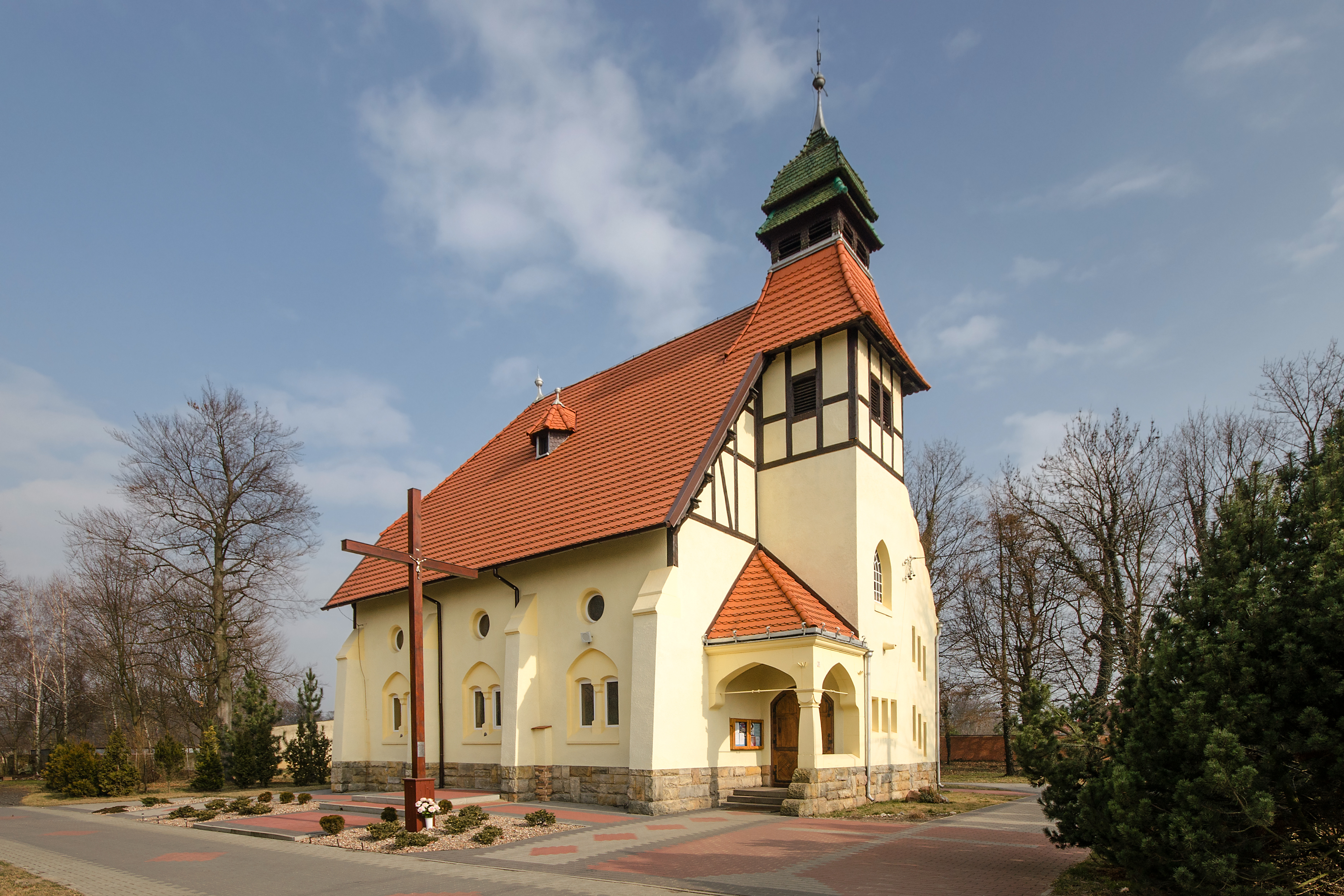
- Saint Bartholomew church

- Location within Poland
- Coordinates: 51°16′N 17°38′E
- Country: Poland
- Voivodeship: Lower Silesian
- County: Oleśnica
- Gmina: Syców
- Time zone: UTC+1 (CET)
  - Summer (DST): UTC+2 (CEST)
- Vehicle registration: DOL

Stradomia Wierzchnia ([straˈdɔmʲa ˈvʲɛʂxɲa]) (German: Ober Stradam) is a village in the administrative district of Gmina Syców, within Oleśnica County, Lower Silesian Voivodeship, in southern Poland.

== History ==
The village was founded by German law and was first recorded around 1305 as Stradano superiori, when it was part of fragmented Piast-ruled Poland. The first known owner was probably Walter de Stradano, witness of a document on April 28, 1310. Later it was divided in 4 parts. One belonged to the Gaffron family (before 1570 to 1611), another to the Rohr family (since 1557) or the Prittwitz family (since 1611). The last manor house in Stradomia Wierzchnia was built by Otto von Reinersdorf-Paczensky und Tenczin in 1866 and rebuilt by Georg von Reinersdorf-Paczensky und Tenczin in 1880. After Second World War it remained unused, the roof collapsed and it was practically a ruin as of 2011.
