= Gaffron family =

Former noble family

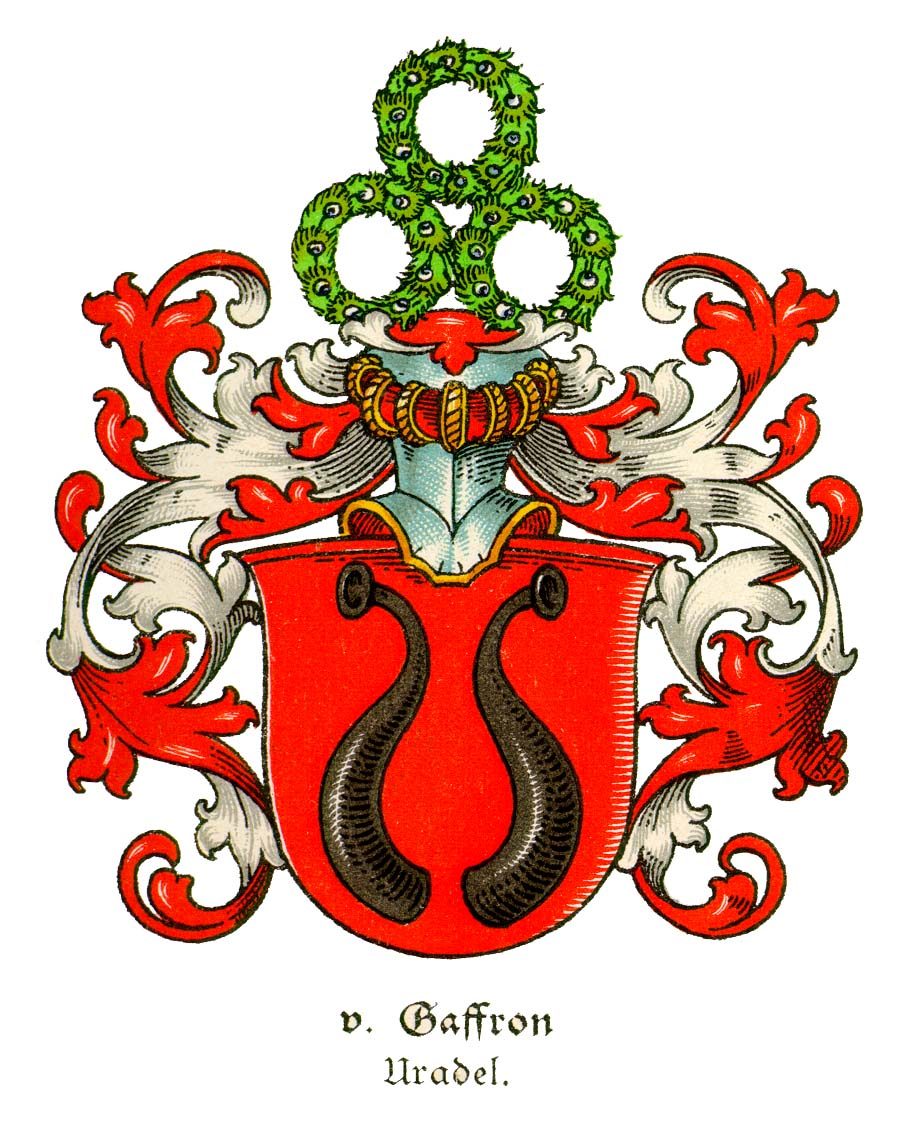
Noble coat of arms

The Gaffron family is the name of a German noble family - classified as Uradel (German for 'ancient nobility') - from Silesia.

== Origins ==
German standard references don't believe that the family was of Polish origin. They are also not mentioned in such Polish ones. And because their coats of arms doesn't belong to any of the Polish clans it's highly unlikely that the Gaffrons originally came from Poland. Firstly, they were recorded on December 13, 1329: Janco von Gaveron was a document witness while Werner von Panwitz donated some money to a cloister in Breslau. (Document of Duke Boleslaus III. of Liegnitz ). The next one is from 1358 when Przibko von Gaweron sold his estate Buschke in the Groß Wartenberg area to Thamo von Hayn (Document of Duke Konrad I. from Oels and Cosel-Beuthen ). Because of such an early appearance in the area of Groß Wartenberg (today Syców) the located village Gaffron there should be their earliest estate. Herrmann von Gaffron und Oberstradam obtained the Prussian title of baron on October 15, 1840, with the name 'Gaffron-Kunern'

== Estates ==
The important estates in the principality of Oels were: Mahjau (Trebnitz county, from 1387 to 1448), Buschka (1358 sold), Gaffron (before 1358 to 1481), Trembatschau (1440 to 1572) also Ober Stradam (before 1557 to 1611 and last part was sold in 1635). Most members lost their estates in the 17th century. But one of them, Sigmund von Gaffron-Oberstradam, left the Oels area and went to his wife's Anna v. Saurma-Jeltsch estate Haltauf in principality of Münsterberg in 1628. His son Max early died as an office in the Habsburg Monarchy's Army. Without his father - his son Adam Abraham should get a catholic education. A way round the problem was to flee and became an officer in the Danish army. His son Palle Max came back to Silesia, got from his aunt the Haltauf estate, 1737 the estate Kunern from his wife and he bought Schreibendorf in 1740. There he became the patronage of the church and built a family-tomb there. His descendants bought Märzdorf around 1800. The last baron of the family, Theodor Freiherr von Gaffron-Kunern, sold Kunern, Haltauf and Märzdorf on November 17, 1882, to the house of Sachsen-Weimar. That was the reason why his children lost their title of baron. As the last estate in Silesia Schreibendorf was sold short after 1900.

== Notable people from the family ==
- Adam Abraham von Gaffron und Oberstradam (October 11, 1665 – May 11, 1738) was Lieutenant General and appointed by Frederik IV King of Denmark to be Governor of the Danish Island Fyn. He married Christine Charlotte Trolle (1685–1760), daughter of the Danish Minister of State Herluf Trolle of Snedinge. In 1730 he received the Danish Collar of The Order of Dannebrogen.
- Ernst Christian Gottlieb von Gaffron u. Oberstradam auf Kunern, (1741–1803), county commissioner of Münsterberg (1780–1803).
- Hermann Freiherr von Gaffron-Kunern, (1797–1870) Member of the House of Lords of Prussia.
- Maximilian Friedrich von Gaffron u. Oberstradam (1727–1800), county commissioner of Liegnitz (1781–1794).
- Theodor Freiherr von Gaffron-Kunern, (1823–1899) Member of the House of Lords of Prussia.

== Literature ==
- Joseph Franzkowski (1912), Geschichte der freien Standesherrschaft, der Stadt und des landrätlichen Kreises Gross Wartenberg (in German), Groß Wartenberg
- Ernst Heinrich Kneschke (1861), Neues allgemeines Deutsches Adels-Lexicon (Band 3) (in German), Leipzig, pp. 425–426
- Johann Sinapius (1720), Schlesischer Curiositäten Erste Vorstellung, Darinnen die ansehnlichen Geschlechter Des Schlesischen Adels...(Band 1) (in German), Leipzig, pp. 376–378
- Johann Sinapius (1728), Des Schlesischen Adels Anderer Theil, Oder Fortsetzung Schlesicher Curiostäten...(Band 2) (in German), Leipzig, pp. 633–635
- Leopold Freiherr v. Zedlitz-Neukirch (1836), Neues Preussisches Adels-Lexicon (Band 2) (in German), Leipzig, pp. 489–490
