= Gmina Pakość =

Gmina Pakość Pakość Commune
- Gmina
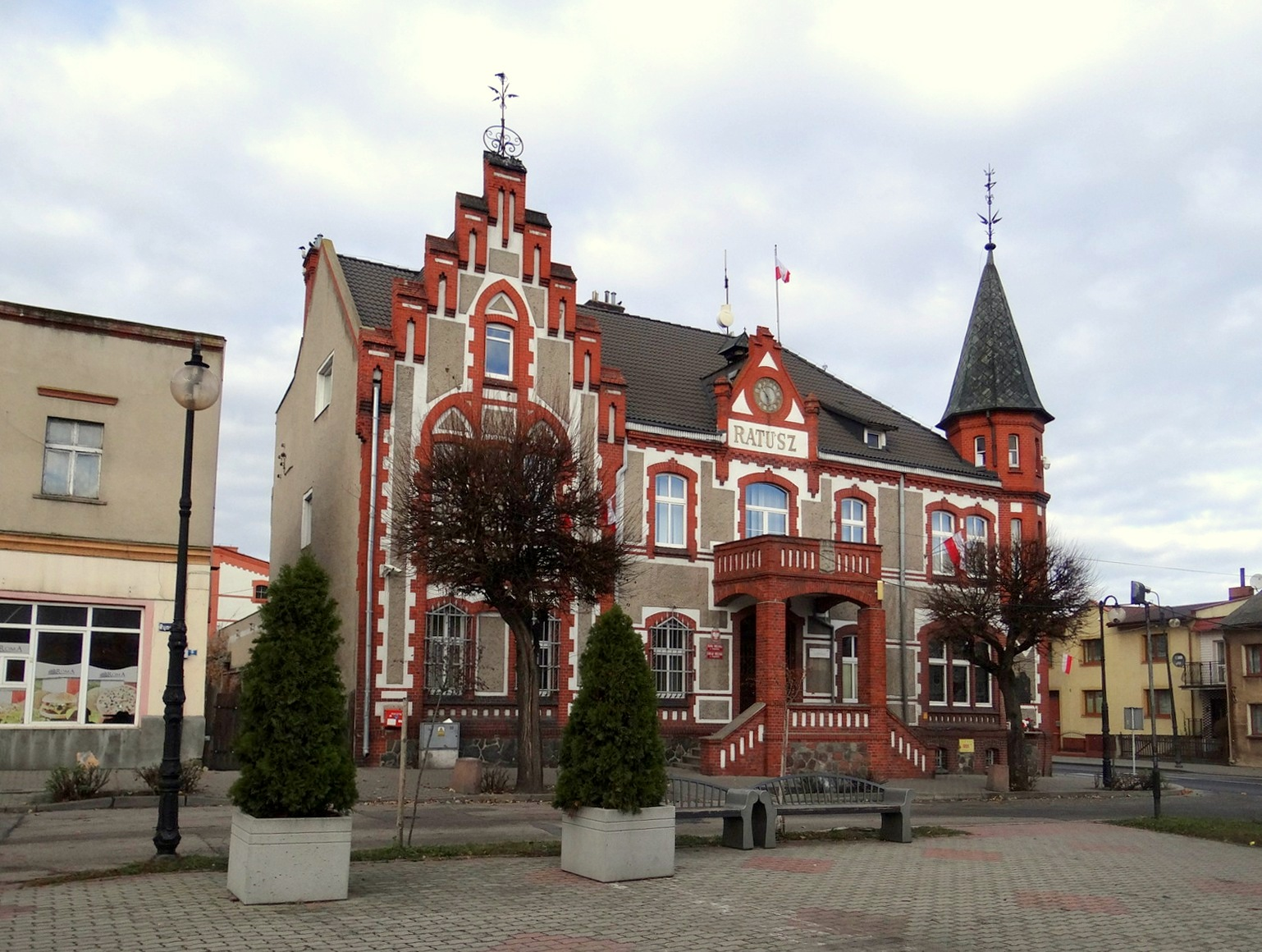
- Town Hall in Pakość, seat of the gmina office

- Coat of arms
- Interactive map of Gmina Pakość
- Coordinates (Pakość): 52°48′19″N 18°5′2″E
- Country: Poland
- Voivodeship: Kuyavian-Pomeranian
- County: Inowrocław
- Seat: Pakość

Area
  - Total: 86.29 km^{2} (33.32 sq mi)

Population (2006)
  - Total: 9,971
  - Density: 115.6/km^{2} (299.3/sq mi)
  - Urban: 5,789
  - Rural: 4,182
- Time zone: UTC+1 (CET)
  - Summer (DST): UTC+2 (CEST)
- Vehicle registration: CIN
- Website: http://www.pakosc.pl/

Gmina Pakość is an urban-rural gmina (administrative district) in Inowrocław County, Kuyavian-Pomeranian Voivodeship, in north-central Poland. Its seat is the town of Pakość, which lies approximately 13 kilometres (8 mi) west of Inowrocław, 36 km (22 mi) south of Bydgoszcz, and 44 km (27 mi) south-west of Toruń.

The gmina covers an area of 86.29 square kilometres (33.3 sq mi), and as of 2006 its total population is 9,971 (out of which the population of Pakość amounts to 5,789, and the population of the rural part of the gmina is 4,182).

== Villages ==
Apart from the town of Pakość, Gmina Pakość contains the villages and settlements of Dziarnowo, Giebnia, Gorzany, Jankowo, Kościelec, Łącko, Ludkowo, Ludwiniec, Mielno, Radłowo, Rybitwy, Rycerzewko, Rycerzewo, Węgierce, Wielowieś and Wojdal.

== Neighbouring gminas ==
Gmina Pakość is bordered by the gminas of Barcin, Dąbrowa, Inowrocław, Janikowo and Złotniki Kujawskie.
