= Komorów, Oleśnica County =

Komorów
- Village
- Location within Poland
- Coordinates: 51°19′40″N 17°41′29″E
- Country: Poland
- Voivodeship: Lower Silesian
- County: Oleśnica
- Gmina: Syców
- Time zone: UTC+1 (CET)
  - Summer (DST): UTC+2 (CEST)
- Vehicle registration: DOL

Komorów [kɔˈmɔruf] is a village in the administrative district of Gmina Syców, within Oleśnica County, Lower Silesian Voivodeship, in south-western Poland.
