= Biskupice, Oleśnica County =

Biskupice
- Village
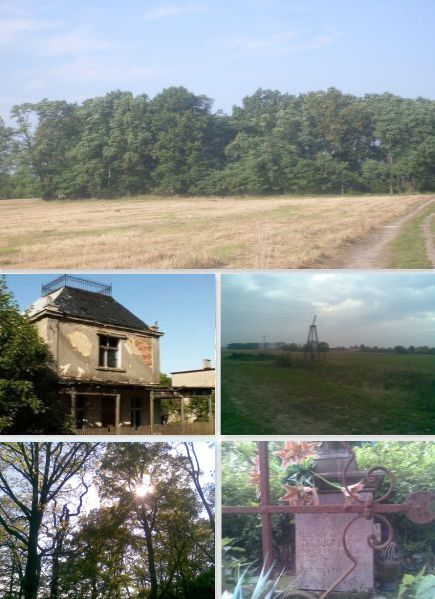

- Location within Poland
- Coordinates: 51°19′54″N 17°38′42″E
- Country: Poland
- Voivodeship: Lower Silesian
- County: Oleśnica
- Gmina: Syców
- Population: 260
- Time zone: UTC+1 (CET)
  - Summer (DST): UTC+2 (CEST)
- Vehicle registration: DOL

Biskupice [bʲiskuˈpʲit͡sɛ] is a village in the administrative district of Gmina Syców, within Oleśnica County, Lower Silesian Voivodeship, in south-western Poland.
