= Drołtowice =

- Village
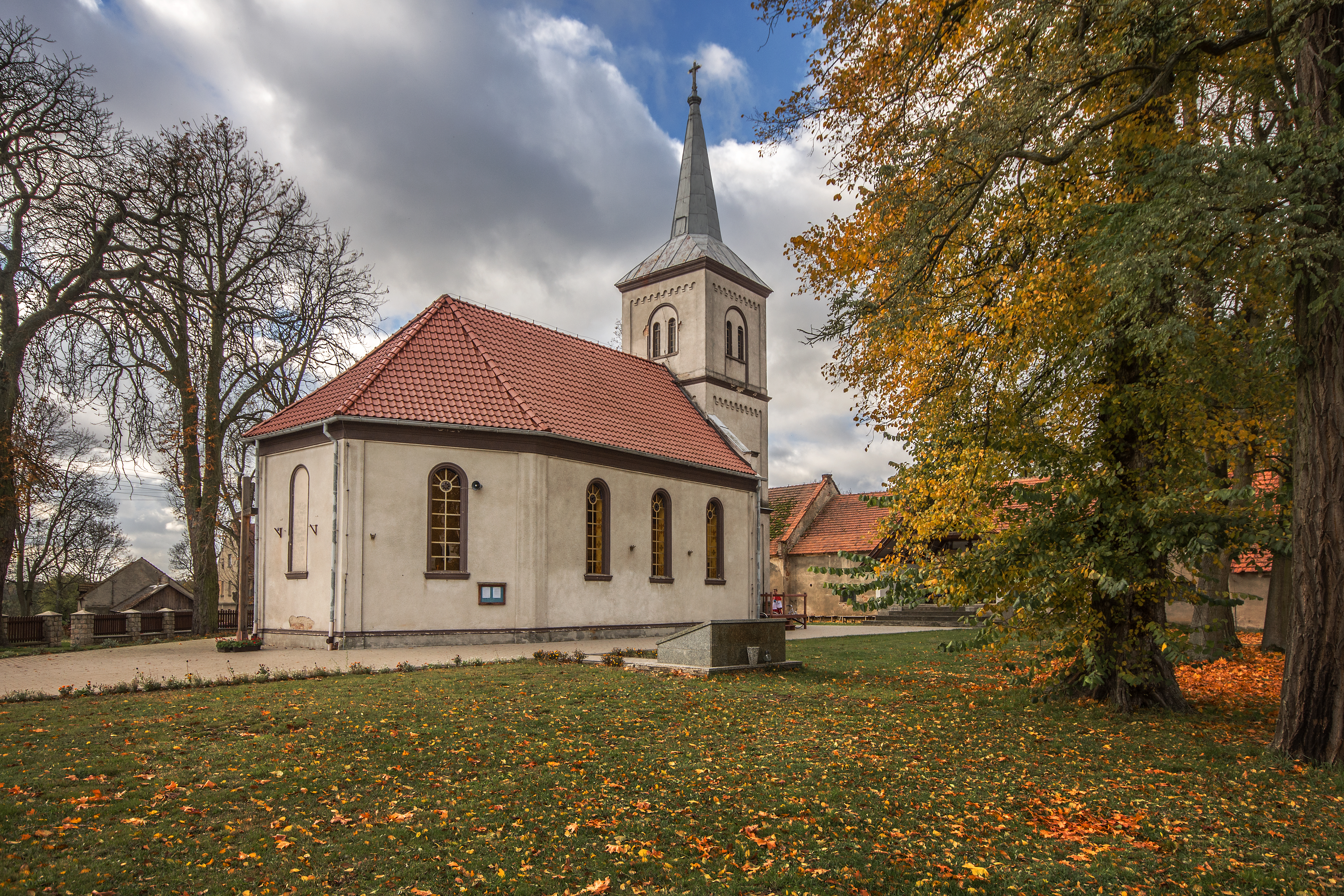
- Saint Matthew the Apostle church in Drołtowice

- Location within Poland
- Coordinates: 51°20′N 17°35′E
- Country: Poland
- Voivodeship: Lower Silesian
- County: Oleśnica
- Gmina: Syców
- Time zone: UTC+1 (CET)
  - Summer (DST): UTC+2 (CEST)
- Vehicle registration: DOL

Drołtowice [drɔu̯tɔˈvʲit͡sɛ] is a village in the administrative district of Gmina Syców, within Oleśnica County, Lower Silesian Voivodeship, in southern Poland.
