= Jankowo, Inowrocław County =

Jankowo
- Village
- Location within Poland
- Coordinates: 52°46′N 18°4′E
- Country: Poland
- Voivodeship: Kuyavian-Pomeranian
- County: Inowrocław
- Gmina: Pakość

Jankowo [janˈkɔvɔ] is a village in the administrative district of Gmina Pakość, within Inowrocław County, Kuyavian-Pomeranian Voivodeship, in north-central Poland.
