= Ludwiniec =

- Village
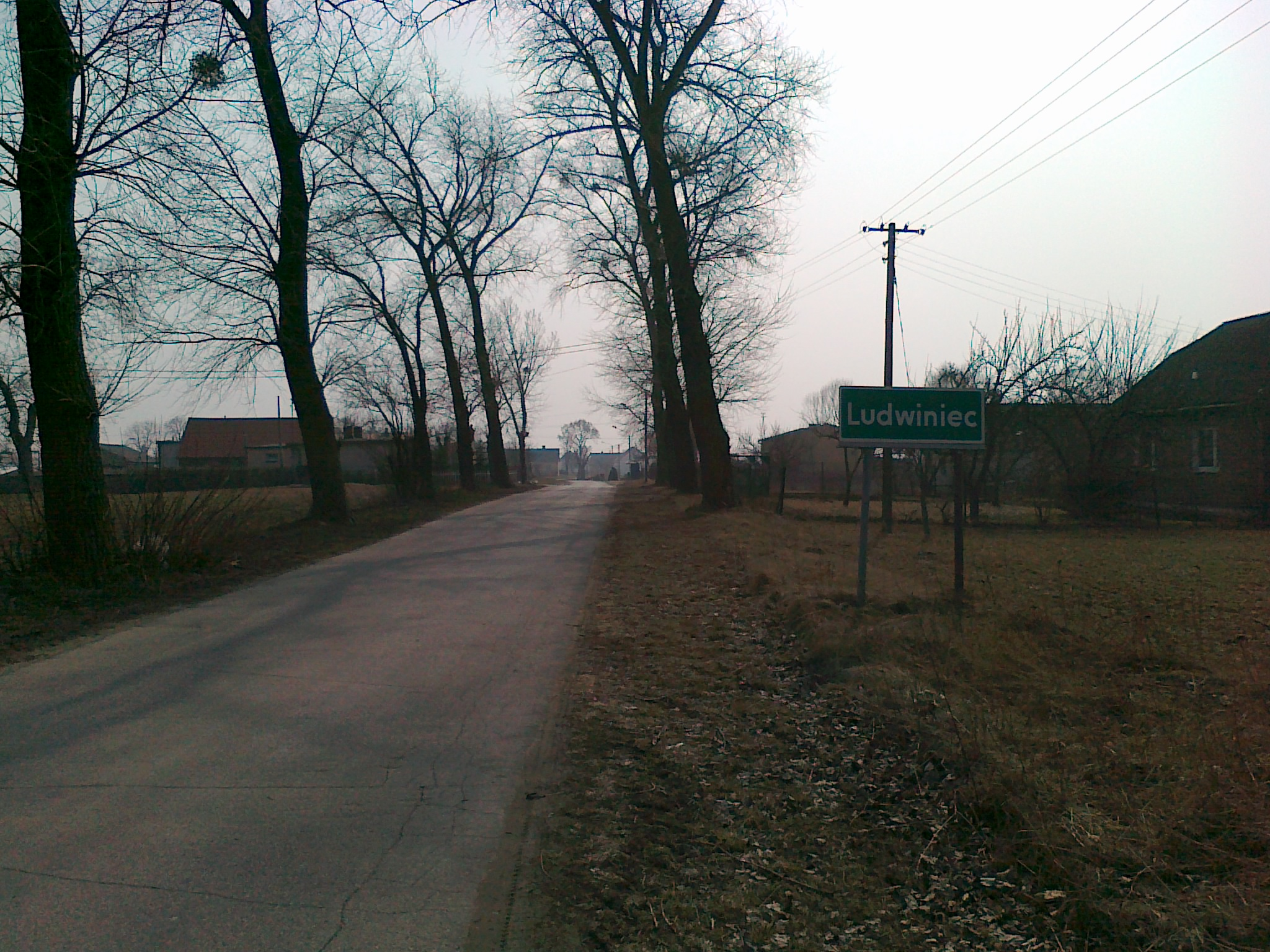

- Location within Poland
- Coordinates: 52°46′00″N 18°02′00″E
- Country: Poland
- Voivodeship: Kuyavian-Pomeranian
- County: Inowrocław
- Gmina: Pakość

Ludwiniec [ludˈviɲɛt͡s] is a village in the administrative district of Gmina Pakość, within Inowrocław County, Kuyavian-Pomeranian Voivodeship, in north-central Poland.
