= Zawada, Lower Silesian Voivodeship =

Zawada
- Village
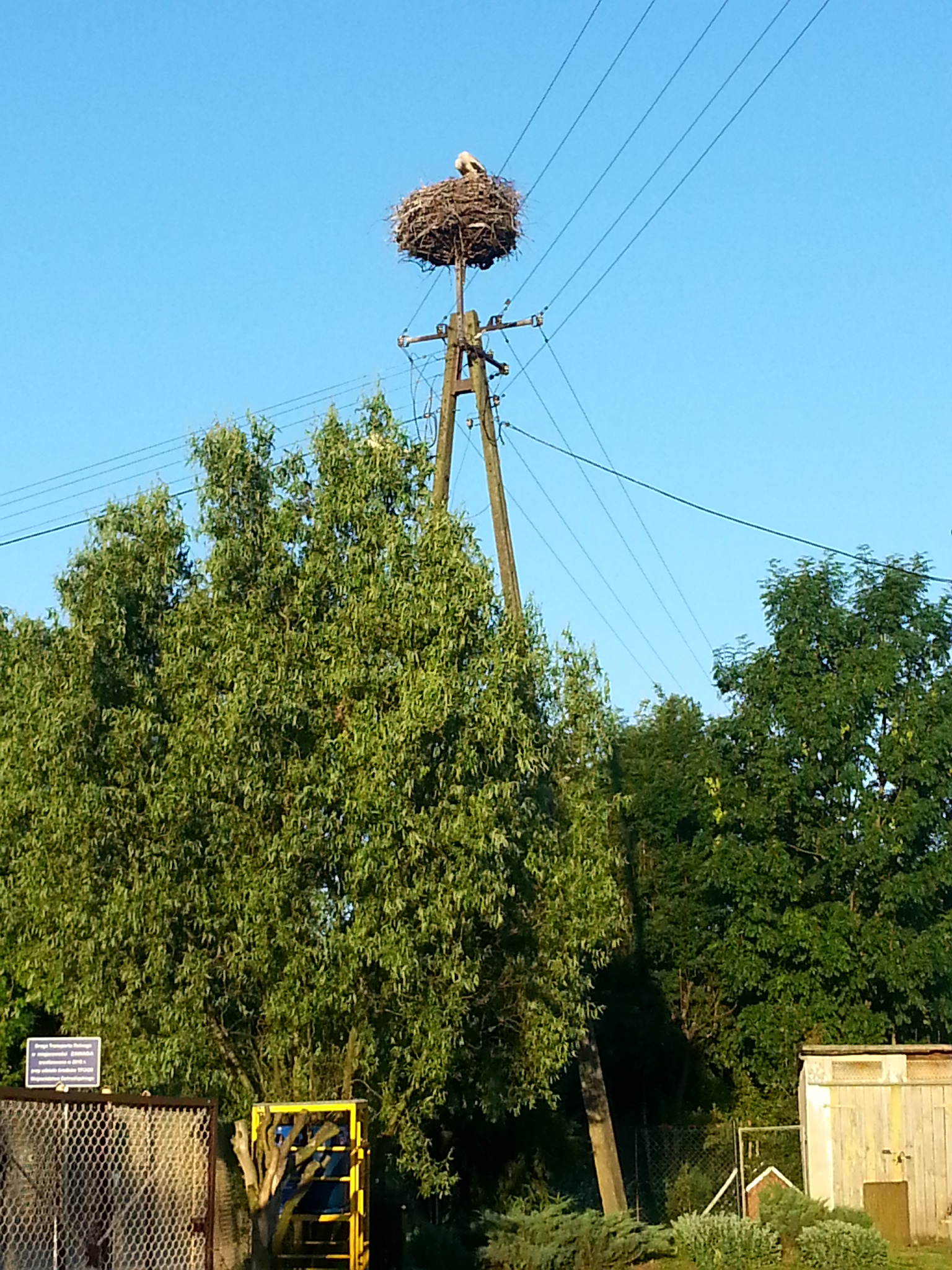

- Location within Poland
- Coordinates: 51°18′39″N 17°36′3″E
- Country: Poland
- Voivodeship: Lower Silesian
- County: Oleśnica
- Gmina: Syców
- Population: 240
- Time zone: UTC+1 (CET)
  - Summer (DST): UTC+2 (CEST)
- Vehicle registration: DOL

Zawada ([zaˈvada]) (German: Dyhrnfeld) is a village in the administrative district of Gmina Syców, within Oleśnica County, Lower Silesian Voivodeship, in southern Poland.

The S8 highway passes nearby, south of Zawada.
