= Radłowo, Kuyavian-Pomeranian Voivodeship =

Radłowo
- Village
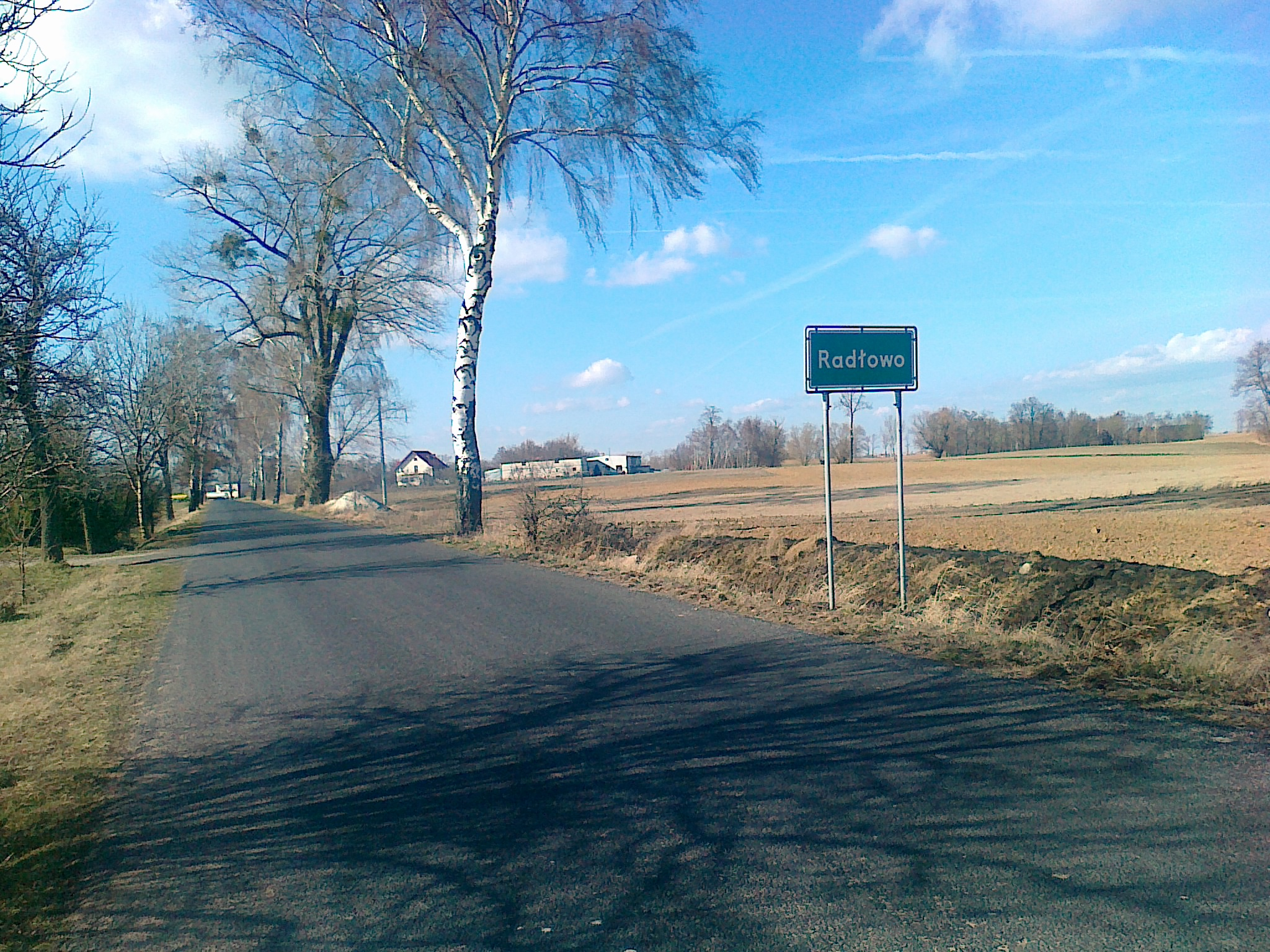

- Location within Poland
- Coordinates: 52°48′N 18°2′E
- Country: Poland
- Voivodeship: Kuyavian-Pomeranian
- County: Inowrocław
- Gmina: Pakość

Radłowo [radˈwɔvɔ] is a village in the administrative district of Gmina Pakość, within Inowrocław County, Kuyavian-Pomeranian Voivodeship, in north-central Poland.
