= Rycerzewo, Kuyavian-Pomeranian Voivodeship =

Rycerzewo
- Village
- Location within Poland
- Coordinates: 52°49′N 18°10′E
- Country: Poland
- Voivodeship: Kuyavian-Pomeranian
- County: Inowrocław
- Gmina: Pakość

Rycerzewo [rɨt͡sɛˈʐɛvɔ] is a village in the administrative district of Gmina Pakość, within Inowrocław County, Kuyavian-Pomeranian Voivodeship, in north-central Poland.
