= Gaszowice, Lower Silesian Voivodeship =

Gaszowice
- Village
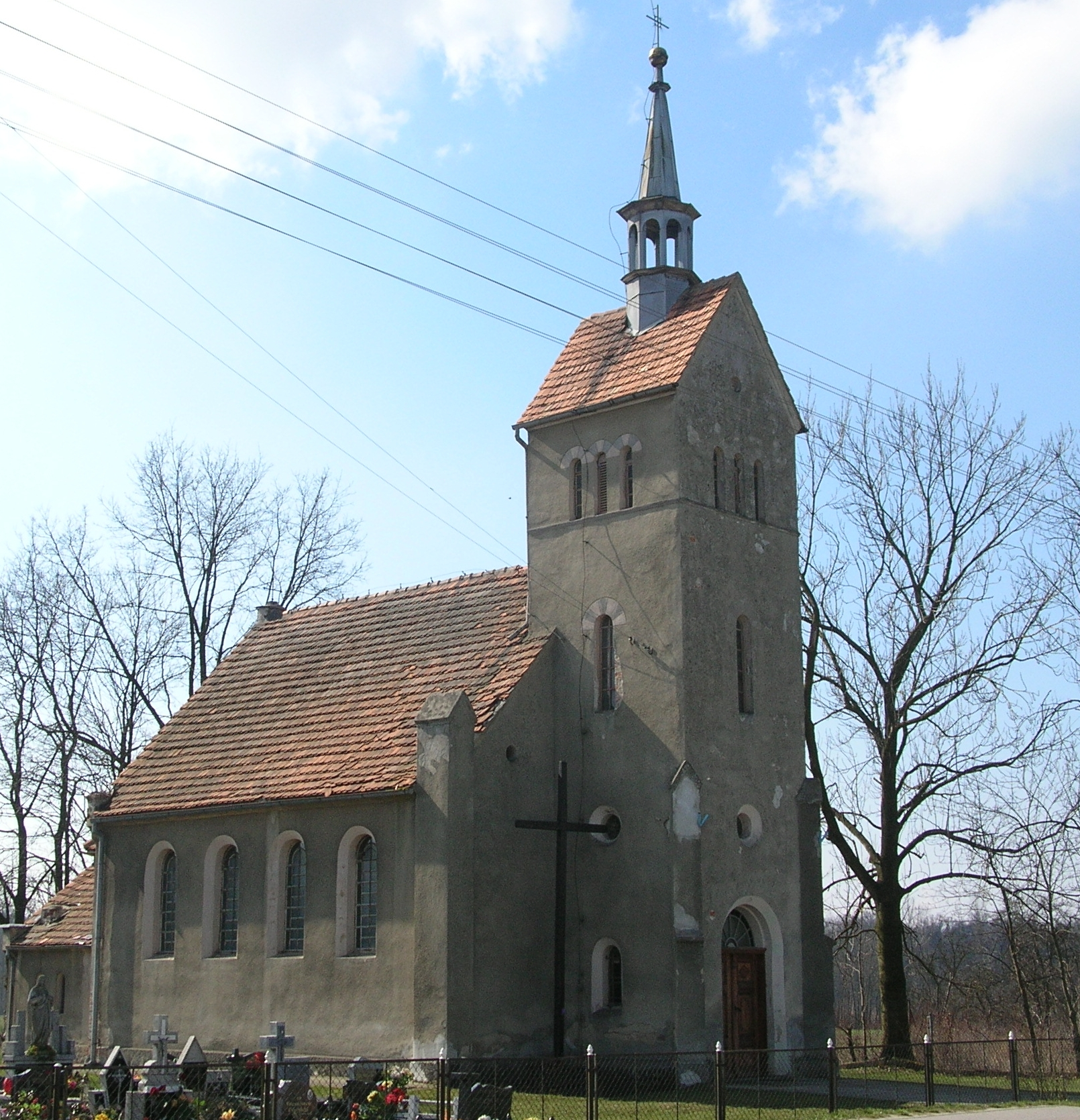
- Our Lady of the Assumption church in Gaszowice

- Location within Poland
- Coordinates: 51°15′34″N 17°35′04″E
- Country: Poland
- Voivodeship: Lower Silesian
- County: Oleśnica
- Gmina: Syców
- Time zone: UTC+1 (CET)
  - Summer (DST): UTC+2 (CEST)
- Vehicle registration: DOL

Gaszowice [ɡaʂɔˈvʲit͡sɛ] is a village in the administrative district of Gmina Syców, within Oleśnica County, Lower Silesian Voivodeship, in south-western Poland.
