= Gmina Syców =

Gmina Syców Syców Commune
- Gmina
- Flag Coat of arms
- Interactive map of Gmina Syców
- Coordinates (Syców): 51°18′36″N 17°43′25″E
- Country: Poland
- Voivodeship: Lower Silesian
- County: Oleśnica
- Seat: Syców
- Sołectwos: Biskupice, Drołtowice, Działosza, Gaszowice, Komorów, Nowy Dwór, Ślizów, Stradomia Wierzchnia, Szczodrów, Wielowieś, Wioska, Zawada

Area
  - Total: 144.79 km^{2} (55.90 sq mi)

Population (2019-06-30)
  - Total: 16,874
  - Density: 116.54/km^{2} (301.84/sq mi)
  - Urban: 10,397
  - Rural: 6,477
- Website: http://www.sycow.pl

Gmina Syców is an urban-rural gmina (administrative district) in Oleśnica County, Lower Silesian Voivodeship, in south-western Poland. Its seat is the town of Syców, which lies approximately 27 kilometres (17 mi) north-east of Oleśnica, and 52 kilometres (32 mi) north-east of the regional capital Wrocław. It is part of the Wrocław metropolitan area.

The gmina covers an area of 144.79 square kilometres (55.9 sq mi), and as of 2019 its total population is 16,874.

== Neighbouring gminas ==
Gmina Syców is bordered by the gminas of Dziadowa Kłoda, Kobyla Góra, Międzybórz, Oleśnica, Perzów and Twardogóra.

== Villages ==
Apart from the town of Syców, the gmina contains the villages of Bielawki, Biskupice, Błotnik, Dłusko, Drołtowice, Działosza, Gaszowice, Komorów, Lesieniec, Ligota Dziesławska, Maliszów, Niwki Garbarskie, Nowy Dwór, Nowy Świat, Pawełki, Pawłowice, Radzyna, Ślizów, Stradomia Wierzchnia, Święty Marek, Szczodrów, Trzy Chałupy, Widawki, Wielowieś, Wioska, Wojciechowo Wielkie, Zawada, Zawady and Zieleniec.

== Twin towns – sister cities ==
Gmina Syców is twinned with:

- Malsch, Germany
