= Wielowieś, Gmina Pakość =

Wielowieś
- Village
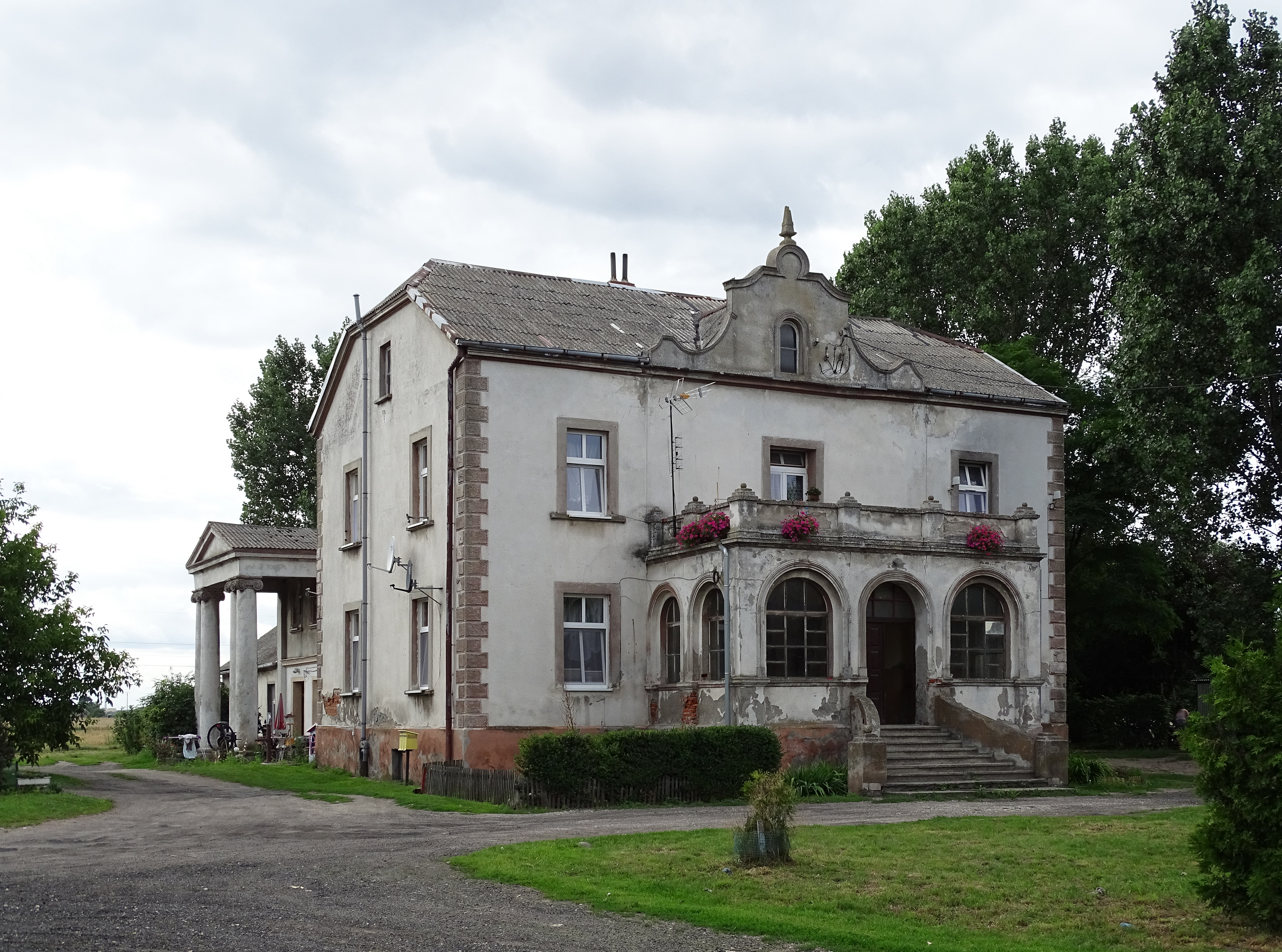
- Former mansion

- Location within Poland
- Coordinates: 52°48′45″N 18°07′30″E
- Country: Poland
- Voivodeship: Kuyavian-Pomeranian
- County: Inowrocław
- Gmina: Pakość

Wielowieś [vjɛˈlɔvjɛɕ] is a village in the administrative district of Gmina Pakość, within Inowrocław County, Kuyavian-Pomeranian Voivodeship, in north-central Poland.
