= Smolna (river) =

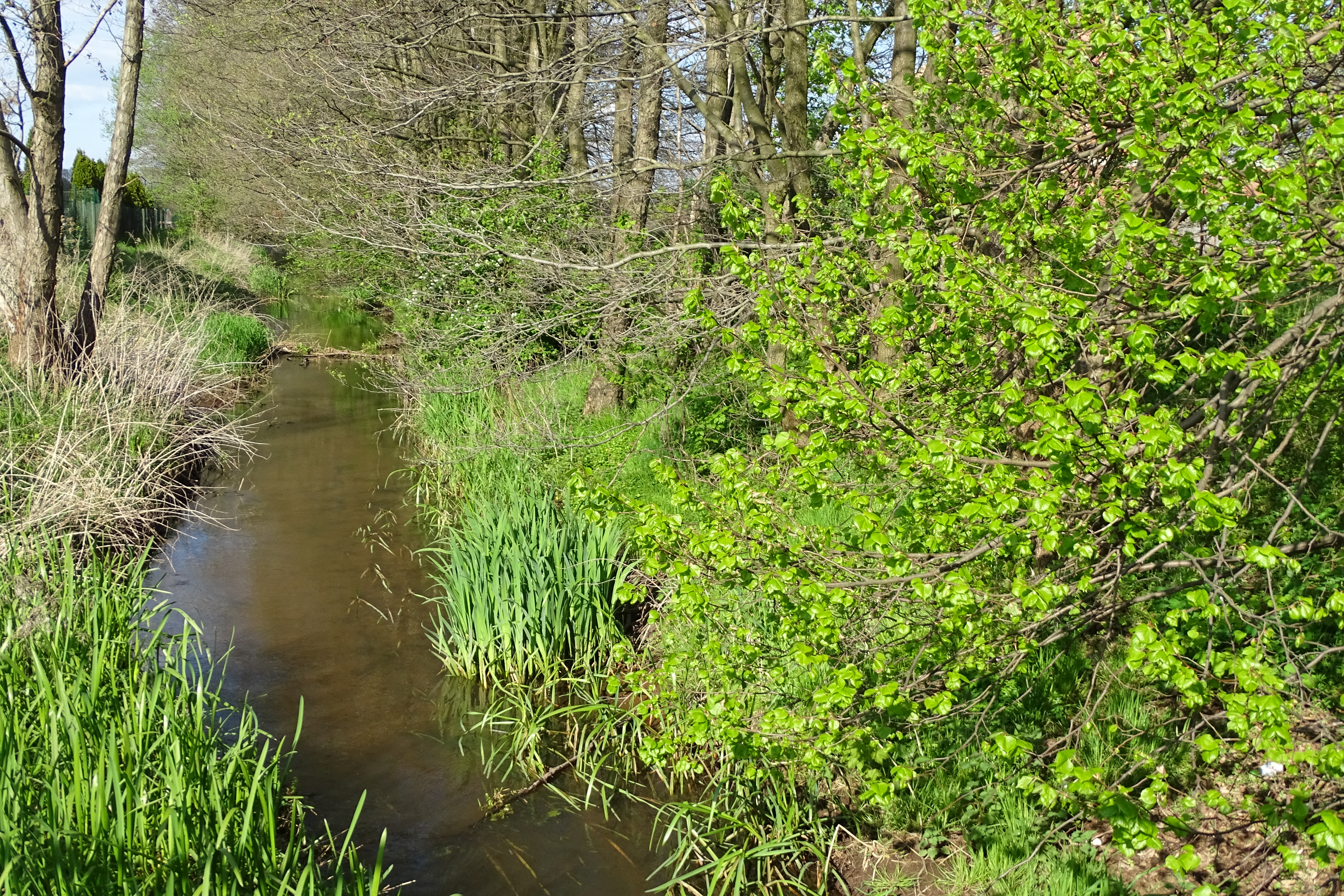
- The Smolna near Ligota Mała

Location
- Country: Poland
- Region: Oleśnica County

Physical characteristics
- Source
  - location: near Wabienice
  - coordinates: 51°11′59″N 17°35′27″E
  - elevation: 192 m.a.s.l.
- Mouth
  - location: Leśny Młyn near Ligota Mała
  - coordinates: 51°07′02″N 17°19′45″E
  - elevation: 131 m.a.s.l.
- Length: 27.46 km (17.06 mi)
- Basin size: 88.63 km²

The Smolna (German: Schmollen) is a 27.46 km long river that is a right-bank tributary of the Widawa River.

== Course ==
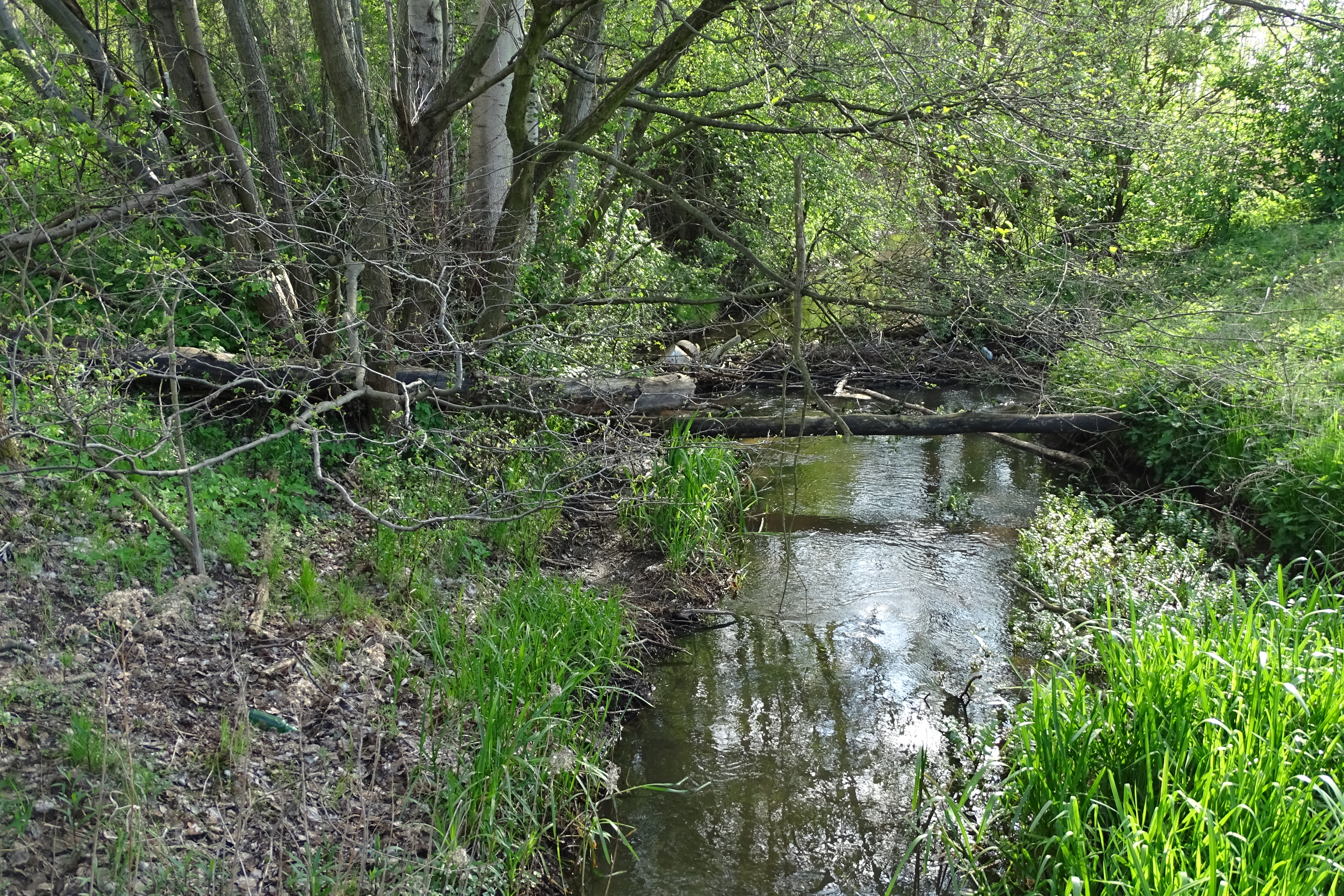
River Smolna in Ligota Mała in April 2023.

The Smolna River begins near the village of Wabienice, located approximately 7 kilometers north-east of Bierutów. Then it flows westwards and after approximately 12 kilometers, at the height of Solniki Wielkie, it crosses the provincial road no. 451. For the next few kilometers, the river flows through a partially forested area, passing Gręboszyce, Smolna and Zimnica. The last town located on the Smolna River is Ligota Mała. After passing Ligota, the river enters the Lasy Grędzińskie reserve - an area protected by Natura 2000. The mouth of the Smolna River to the Widawa River is located near the currently abandoned hamlet of Leśny Młyn, on the 72nd kilometer of the river.

== Description ==
The Smolna is a lowland river of the 3rd order, with a length of 27.46 km or 27.34 km and a catchment area of 88.63 km^{2}. The river has several tributaries of the 4th and 5th order, including: the Mesznik, Sucha Rzeka and Gorzesławka streams, and is also fed by numerous drainage ditches and streams. According to data from 2009, the permissible standards for NH_{4}, NO_{2} and Cu were exceeded in the Smolna waters, which makes the river an unfriendly environment for the existence of cyprinids. Along the river in the Grędzińskie Forest reserve there is a complex of hornbeam forests, oak forests and extensive meadows, which is a refuge for amphibians found here, among others. fire-bellied toads, tree frogs and newts. The Smolna River falls under the fishing district of the Widawa River No. 3, belonging to the PZW Wrocław branch.

== See also ==
- Widawa
- List of rivers of Poland
