= Oleśnica (river) =

Oleśnica Oleśniczanka
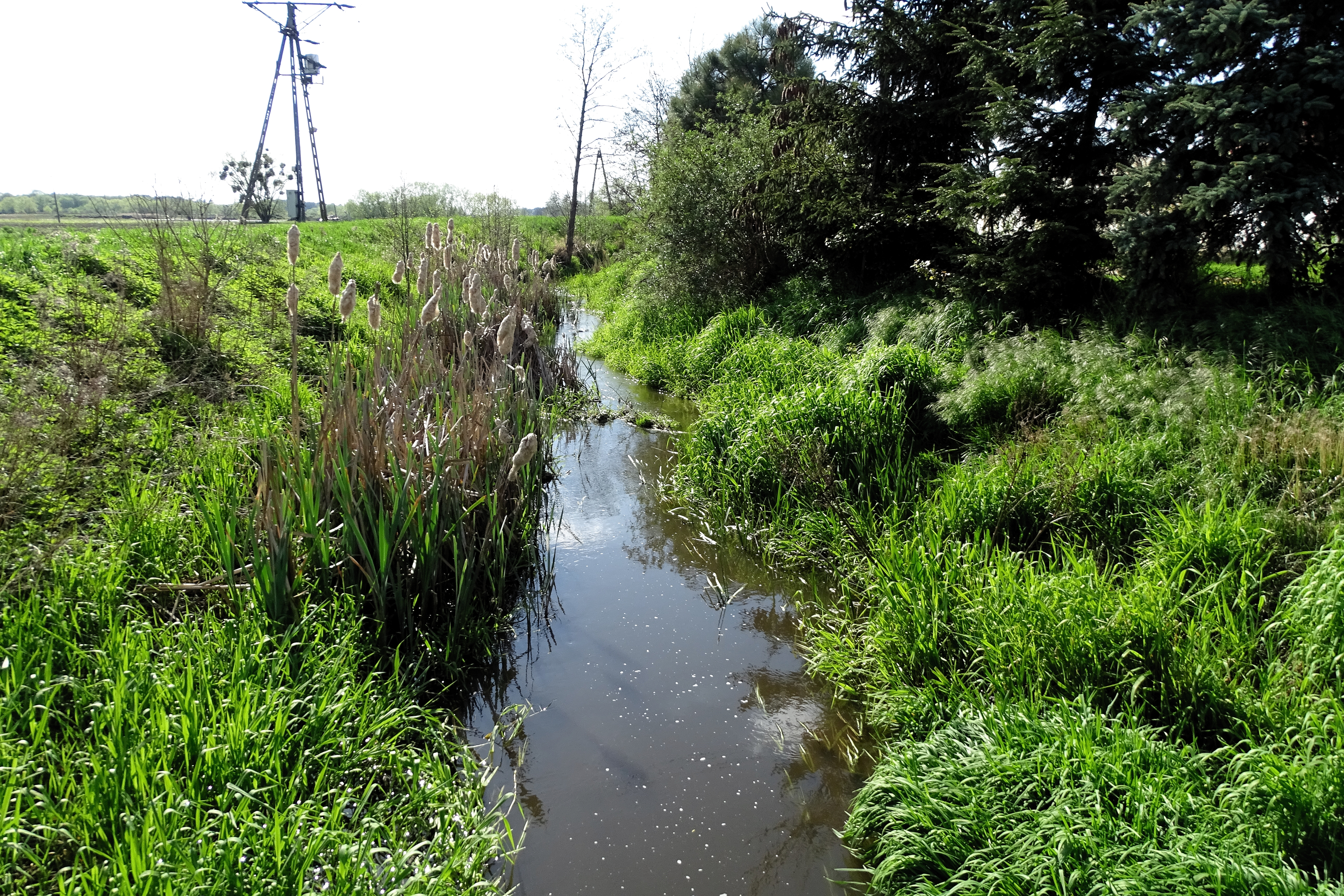
- The Oleśnica River near Brzezia Łąka

Location
- Country: Poland
- Region: Oleśnica County

Physical characteristics
- Source
  - location: near Drogoszowice
  - coordinates: 51°20′37″N 17°29′51″E
  - elevation: 202 m.a.s.l.
- Mouth
  - location: near Śliwice
  - coordinates: 51°06′54″N 17°12′30″E
  - elevation: 118 m.a.s.l.
- Length: 43.49 km (27.02 mi)

Basin features
- Cities: Oleśnica
- Tributaries
  - left: Potok Boguszycki

The Oleśnica (pronounced: [ɔlɛɕˈɲit͡sa]; German: Oelsbach) is a 43.49-kilometre-long (27.02 mi) river that is the longest right-bank tributary of the Widawa River.

== Course ==
It flows in the Lower Silesian Voivodeship in the Oleśnica and Wrocław counties. Its sources are located in the Twardogórskie Hills near Drogoszowice. It flows through the town of Oleśnica and the villages: Sokołowice, Smardzów, Raków, Brzezia Łąka. It flows into the Widawa River west of the town of Brzezia Łąka. One of the river's tributaries is Potok Boguszycki.
