= Nowoszyce =

Nowoszyce may refer to the following places in Poland:

- Nowoszyce, Oleśnica County in Gmina Oleśnica, Oleśnica County in Lower Silesian Voivodeship (SW Poland)
- Nowoszyce, Zgorzelec County in Gmina Sulików, Zgorzelec County in Lower Silesian Voivodeship (SW Poland)
