= Smolna =

Smolna may refer to the following places:

- Smolna, Helsinki, Finland
- Smolna, Lower Silesian Voivodeship, Poland
- Smolna Street, Warsaw, Poland
