= Vyshgorod (disambiguation) =

Vyshgorod (Russian: Вышгород, Ukrainian: Вишгород), literally "upper town" may refer to:

- Vyshhorod, town in Vyshhorod Raion, Kyiv Oblast, Ukraine; medieval residence of Kyivan rulers
  - Vyshhorod Raion, raion in Kyiv Oblast, Ukraine, whose administrative centre is Vyshhorod
- Vyshgorod, village in Ryazansky District, Ryazan Oblast, Russia
- Vyshgorod, village in Kuvshinovsky District, Tver Oblast, Russia
- Toompea, hill and historical ruling centre inside the old town of Tallinn, Estonia, often referred to as Вышгород (Vyshgorod) in Russian language

== See also ==
- Visegrad
- Wyszogród (disambiguation)
- Vyshgorodok, village in Pytalovsky District, Pskov Oblast, Russia
- Vyšehrad, historic fort in Prague, Czech Republic
