= Wyszogród (disambiguation) =

Wyszogród may refer to the following places in Poland:

- Wyszogród, a town in Masovian Voivodeship (central Poland)
- Wyszogród, Lower Silesian Voivodeship (south-west Poland)
- Wyszogród, Świętokrzyskie Voivodeship (south-central Poland)
- Wyszogród hillfort, historic Kuyavian stronghold of Duchy of Bydgoszcz and Wyszogród, currently Fordon, a district of Bydgoszcz, Kuyavian-Pomeranian Voivodeship, mid-northern Poland

== See also ==
- Vyshgorod (disambiguation)
- Visegrad
