= Spalice =

- Village
- Location within Poland
- Coordinates: 51°13′3″N 17°24′33″E
- Country: Poland
- Voivodeship: Lower Silesian
- County: Oleśnica
- Gmina: Gmina Oleśnica
- Population: 609

Spalice [spaˈlit͡sɛ] is a village in the administrative district of Gmina Oleśnica, within Oleśnica County, Lower Silesian Voivodeship, in south-western Poland.
