= Ligota Wielka, Oleśnica County =

Ligota Wielka
- Village
- Location within Poland
- Coordinates: 51°10′09″N 17°23′20″E
- Country: Poland
- Voivodeship: Lower Silesian
- County: Oleśnica
- Gmina: Gmina Oleśnica

Ligota Wielka [liˈɡɔta ˈvjɛlka] is a village in the administrative district of Gmina Oleśnica, within Oleśnica County, Lower Silesian Voivodeship, in south-western Poland.
