= VyshHora =

Ukrainian ski complex

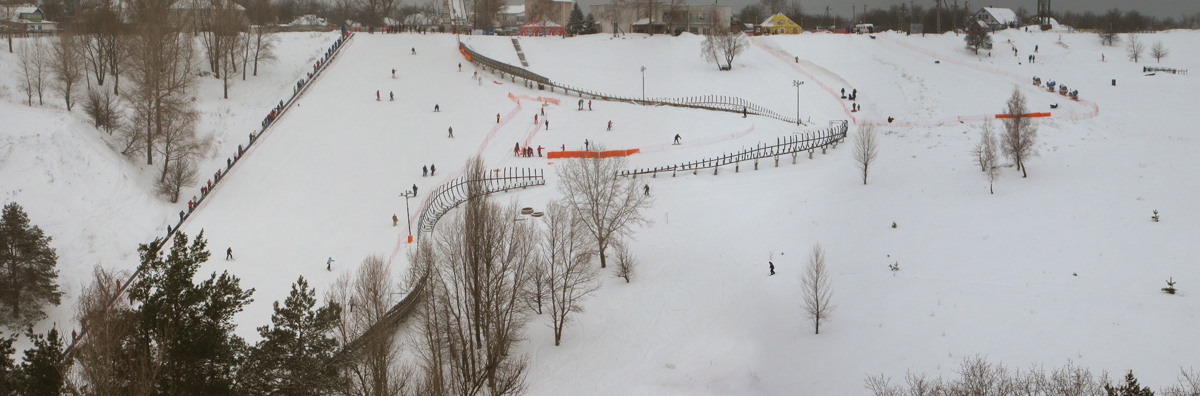
- Interactive map of VyshHora
- Location: banks of the Kyiv Reservoir
- Nearest city: Vyshhorod, Kyiv Oblast
- Coordinates: 50.603247°N 30.488624°E
- Trails: 3
- Longest run: 220 m (720 ft)
- Lift system: 1 (magic carpet)
- Terrain parks: snowboard park, snowtubing rides
- Night skiing: Sat 23:00 - 04:00
- Website: Official website

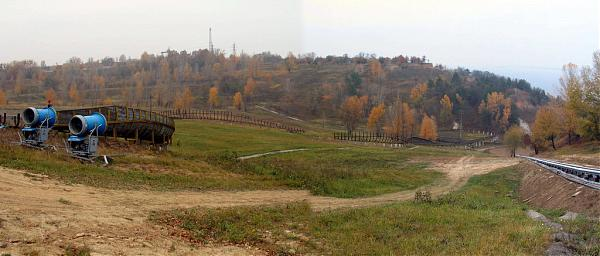
offseason at VyshHora ski resort

VyshHora (Ukrainian: ВишГора) is a ski complex close to Kyiv (also known as Fedot Hill) in Vyshhorod, Ukraine. It is a former luge complex and still contains a luge track.

Built in the Soviet Union, in 1993 the luge sports complex closed and about a half year later the track caught on fire. Now the luge track is nonoperational. The sports complex however has a great story as here started out the native of Kyiv Natalya Yakushenko who was an Olympian flagbearer for Ukraine at the 2006 Winter Olympics.

Today the ski resort has several pistes, one of them is for skiing. The complex also has trails for snowboarding and snowtubing. Some small ski ramps are available for more advanced ski-goers.

There is a fancy ski lift and a ski school.

Also equipment rental and a small cafe are open for winter sports lovers, medical center, and a ski shop to fix sports equipment.

Public transportation is available from Kyiv. During a sports season the official website broadcasts its ski area throughout a day.
