= Poniatowice =

- Village
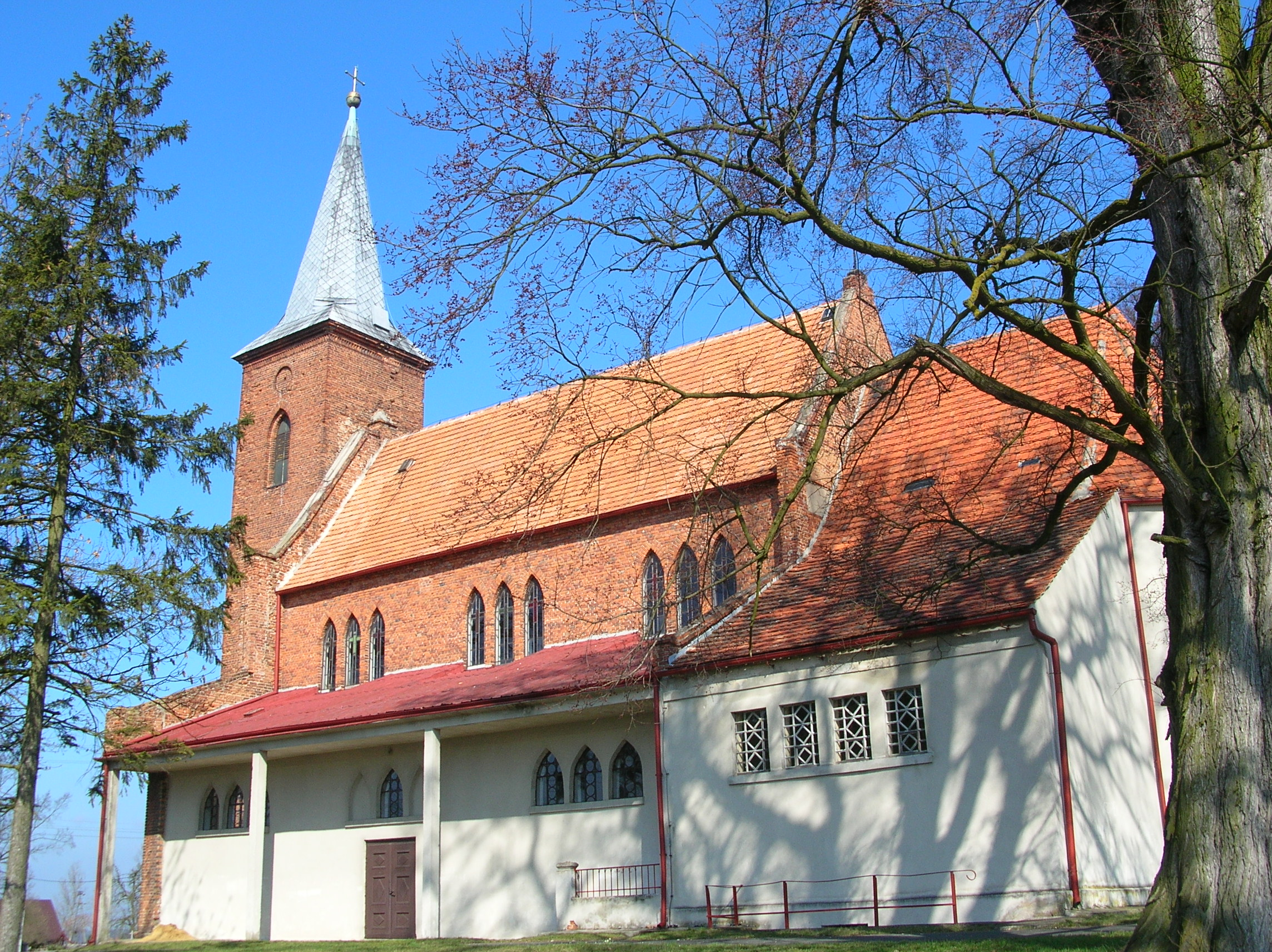

- Location within Poland
- Coordinates: 51°14′N 17°33′E
- Country: Poland
- Voivodeship: Lower Silesian
- County: Oleśnica
- Gmina: Gmina Oleśnica

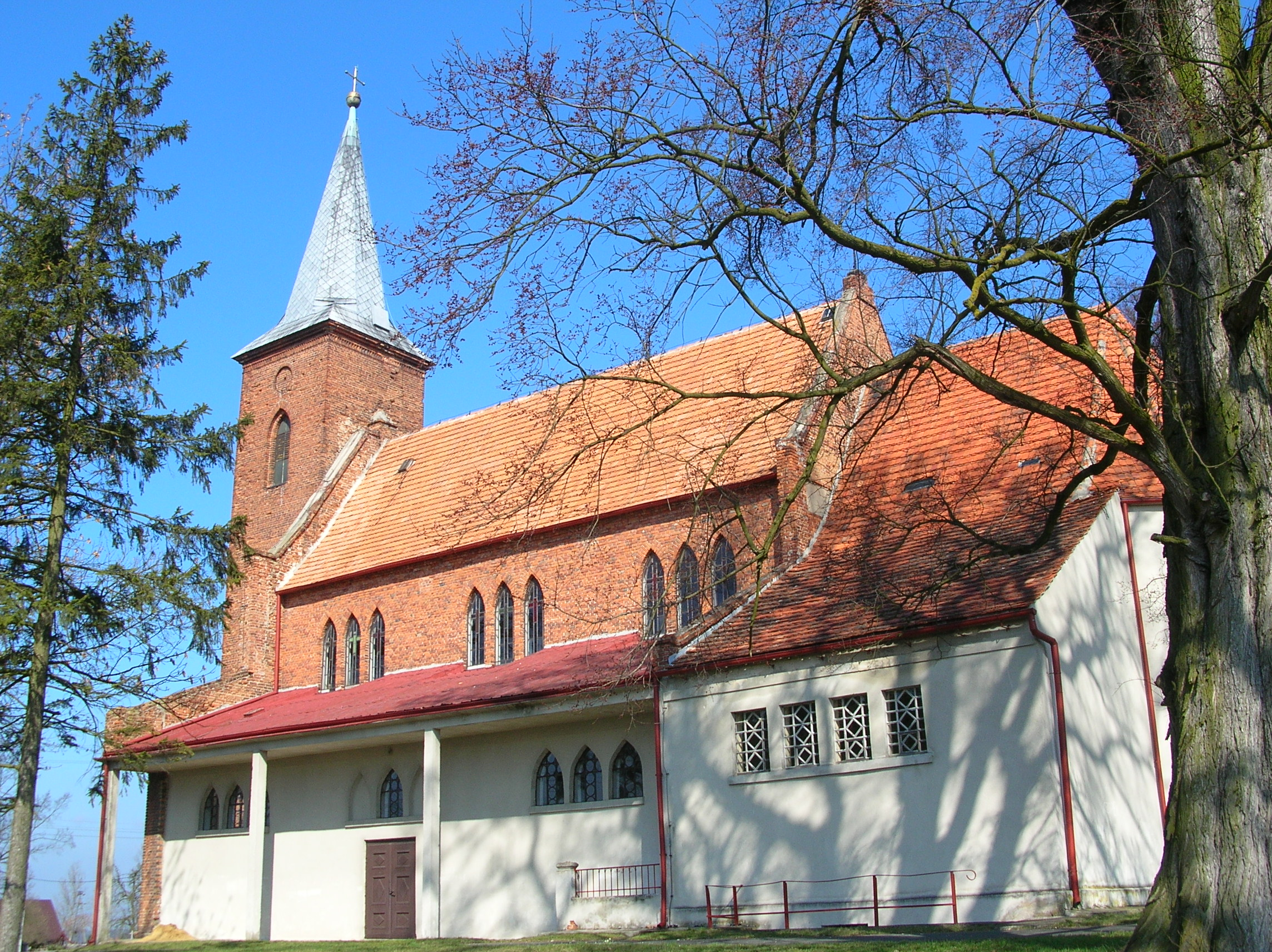
Church in Poniatowice

Poniatowice [pɔɲatɔˈvit͡sɛ] is a village in the administrative district of Gmina Oleśnica, within Oleśnica County, Lower Silesian Voivodeship, in south-western Poland.
