= Gmina Oleśnica, Lower Silesian Voivodeship =

Gmina Oleśnica Oleśnica Commune
- Gmina
- Coat of arms
- Interactive map of Gmina Oleśnica
- Coordinates (Oleśnica): 51°12′N 17°23′E
- Country: Poland
- Voivodeship: Lower Silesian
- County: Oleśnica
- Seat: Oleśnica
- Sołectwos: Bogusławice, Boguszyce, Brzezinka, Bystre, Cieśle, Dąbrowa, Gręboszyce, Jenkowice, Krzeczyn, Ligota Mała, Ligota Polska, Ligota Wielka, Nieciszów, Nowa Ligota, Nowoszyce, Osada Leśna, Ostrowina, Piszkawa, Poniatowice, Smardzów, Smolna, Sokołowice, Spalice, Świerzna, Wszechświęte, Wyszogród, Zarzysko, Zimnica

Area
  - Total: 243.44 km^{2} (93.99 sq mi)

Population (2019-06-30)
  - Total: 13,689
  - Density: 56.232/km^{2} (145.64/sq mi)
- Website: http://www.olesnica.wroc.pl

Gmina Oleśnica is a rural gmina (administrative district) in Oleśnica County, Lower Silesian Voivodeship, in south-western Poland. Its seat is the town of Oleśnica, although the town is not part of the territory of the gmina.

The gmina covers an area of 243.44 square kilometres (94.0 sq mi), and as of 2019 its total population is 13,689.

== Neighbouring gminas ==
Gmina Oleśnica is bordered by the town of Oleśnica and the gminas of Bierutów, Czernica, Długołęka, Dobroszyce, Dziadowa Kłoda, Jelcz-Laskowice, Syców and Twardogóra.

== Villages ==
The gmina contains the villages of Bogusławice, Boguszyce, Brzezinka, Bystre, Cieśle, Dąbrowa, Gręboszyce, Jenkowice, Krzeczyn, Ligota Mała, Ligota Polska, Ligota Wielka, Nieciszów, Nowa Ligota, Nowoszyce, Osada Leśna, Ostrowina, Piszkawa, Poniatowice, Smardzów, Smolna, Sokołowice, Spalice, Świerzna, Wszechświęte, Wyszogród, Zarzysko and Zimnica.
