= Dąbrowa, Gmina Oleśnica =

Dąbrowa
- Village
- Location within Poland
- Coordinates: 51°13′57″N 17°21′46″E
- Country: Poland
- Voivodeship: Lower Silesian
- County: Oleśnica
- Gmina: Gmina Oleśnica
- Population (approx.): 360
- Time zone: UTC+1 (CET)
  - Summer (DST): UTC+2 (CEST)
- Vehicle registration: DOL

Dąbrowa [dɔmˈbrɔva] is a village in the administrative district of Gmina Oleśnica, within Oleśnica County, Lower Silesian Voivodeship, in south-western Poland.
