= Vyshhorod urban hromada =

Vyshhorod urban hromada Вишгородська міська громада
- Hromada
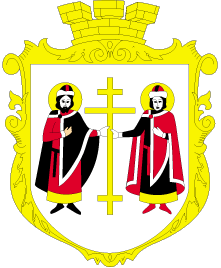
- Seal
- Interactive map of Vyshhorod urban hromada
- Country: Ukraine
- Oblast: Kyiv
- Raion: Vyshhorod

Area
  - Total: 93.7 km^{2} (36.2 sq mi)

Population (2020)
  - Total: 33,276
  - Density: 355/km^{2} (920/sq mi)
- Settlements: 3
- Cities: 1
- Villages: 2

Vyshhorod urban hromada (Ukrainian: Вишгородська міська громада) is a hromada of Ukraine, located in Vyshhorod Raion, Kyiv Oblast. Its administrative center is the city Vyshhorod.

It has an area of 93.7 square kilometres (36.2 mi^{2}) and a population of 33,276, as of 2020.

The hromada contains 3 settlements: 1 city (Vyshhorod), and 2 villages (Oseshchyna and Khotianivka).

== See also ==
- List of hromadas of Ukraine
