= Khotianivka =

Rural locality in Kyiv Oblast, Ukraine

Khotianivka Хотянівка
- Village
- Interactive map of Khotianivka
- Coordinates: 50°36′21″N 30°34′31″E
- Country: Ukraine
- Oblast: Kyiv
- Raion: Vyshhorod
- Founded: 1919

Population (2001)
  - Total: 982
- Postal code: 07363

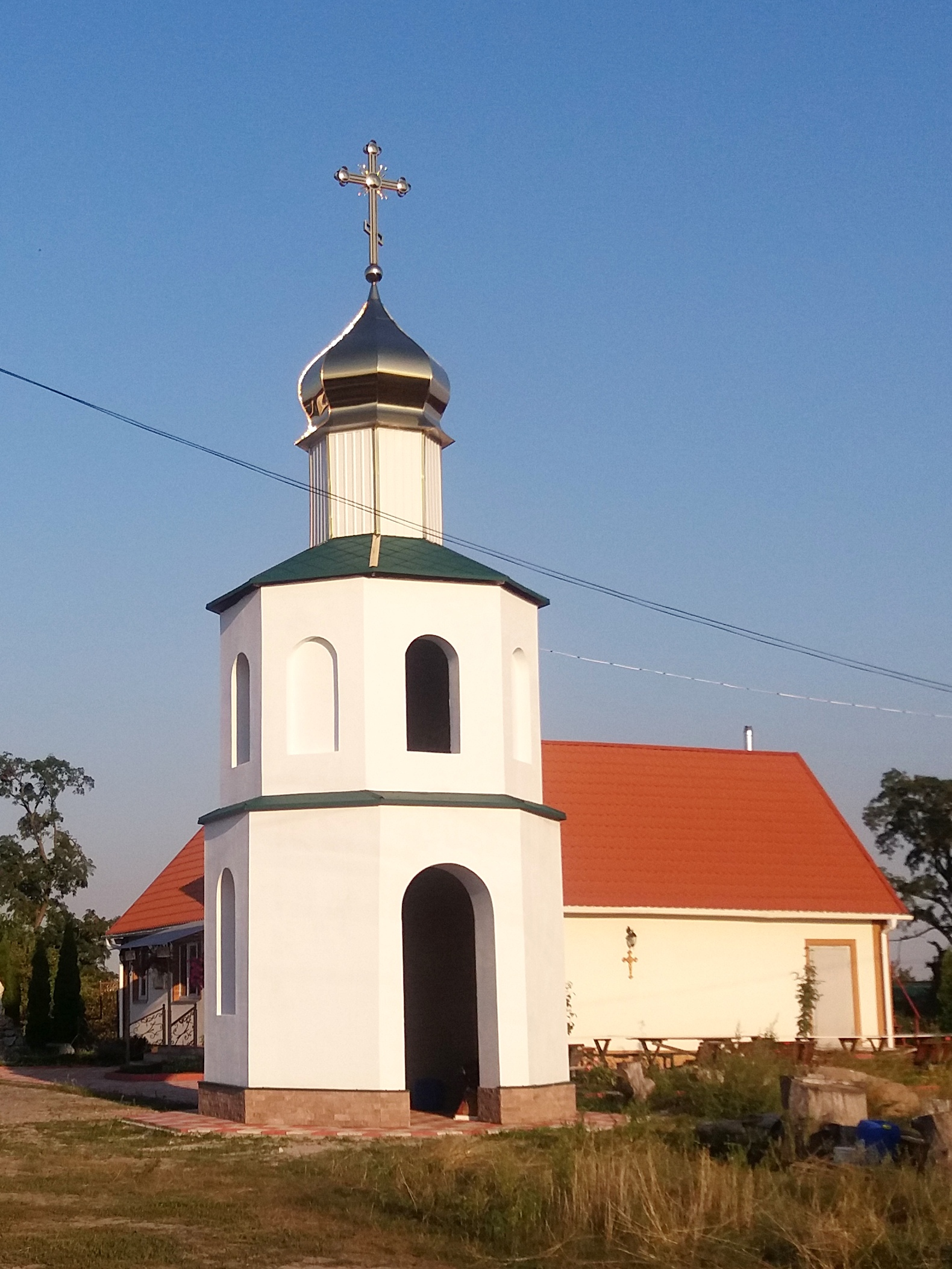
Church of the Transfiguration of the Lord, Moscow Patriarchate, Khotyanivka village

Khotianivka (Ukrainian: Хотянівка) is a village in Vyshhorod Raion, Kyiv Oblast (province) of Ukraine. It hosts the administration of Vyshhorod urban hromada, one of the hromadas of Ukraine.
