= Ligota Polska =

- Village
- Location within Poland
- Coordinates: 51°15′N 17°33′E
- Country: Poland
- Voivodeship: Lower Silesian
- County: Oleśnica
- Gmina: Gmina Oleśnica

Ligota Polska [liˈɡɔta ˈpɔlska] is a village in the administrative district of Gmina Oleśnica, within Oleśnica County, Lower Silesian Voivodeship, in south-western Poland.
