= Ostrowina =

Village in Lower Silesian Voivodeship, Poland

- Village
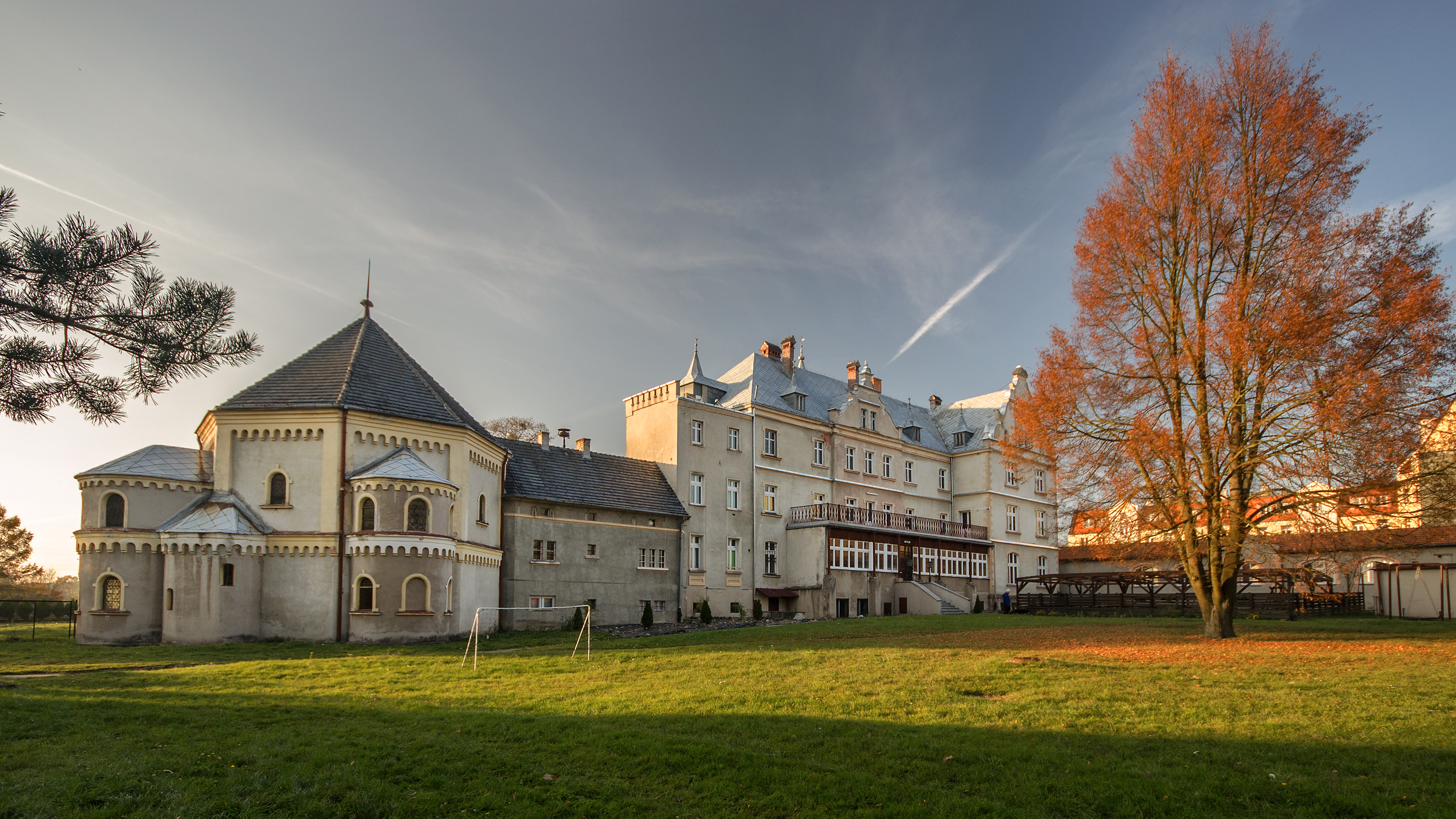

- Location within Poland
- Coordinates: 51°17′25″N 17°31′53″E
- Country: Poland
- Voivodeship: Lower Silesian
- County: Oleśnica
- Gmina: Gmina Oleśnica

Ostrowina [ɔstrɔˈvina] is a village in the administrative district of Gmina Oleśnica, within Oleśnica County, Lower Silesian Voivodeship, in south-western Poland.
