= Zarzysko =

- Village
- Location within Poland
- Coordinates: 51°11′37″N 17°29′55″E
- Country: Poland
- Voivodeship: Lower Silesian
- County: Oleśnica
- Gmina: Gmina Oleśnica

Zarzysko [zaˈʐɨskɔ] is a village in the administrative district of Gmina Oleśnica, within Oleśnica County, Lower Silesian Voivodeship, in south-western Poland. Area of Zarzysko, Olesnica (Gmina) is 79107m^{2}.

== Demographics ==
Population is only 17. Population change from 1975 to 2015 is +325%. There was no population change 2000–2015. Timezone is Central European Summer Time.
