= Nieciszów =

- Village
- Location within Poland
- Coordinates: 51°10′55″N 17°19′35″E
- Country: Poland
- Voivodeship: Lower Silesian
- County: Oleśnica
- Gmina: Gmina Oleśnica
- Population: 368

Nieciszów [ɲɛˈt͡ɕiʂuf] is a village in the administrative district of Gmina Oleśnica, within Oleśnica County, Lower Silesian Voivodeship, in south-western Poland.
