= Brzezinka, Lower Silesian Voivodeship =

Brzezinka
- Village
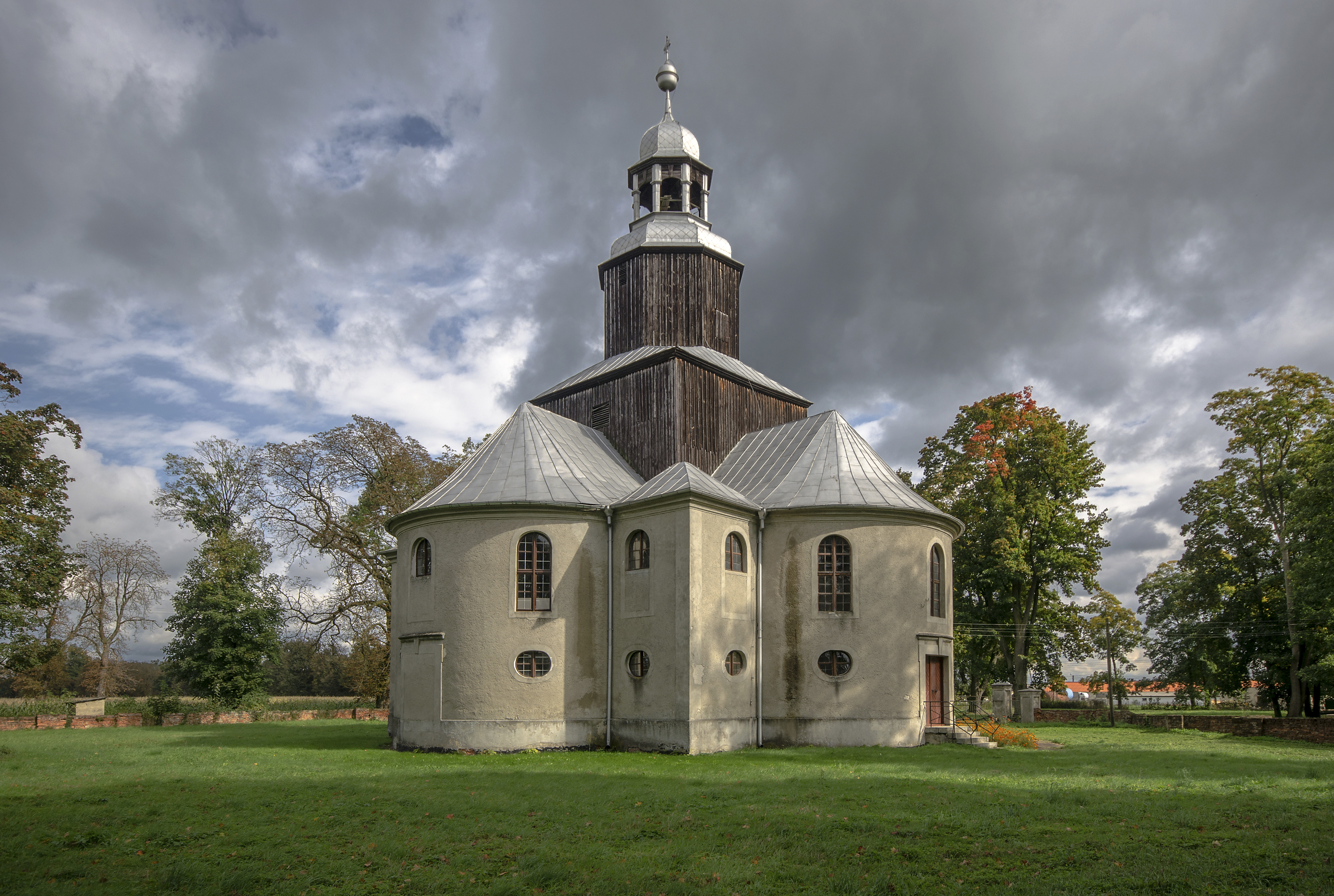
- Church of the Assumption of the Holy Virgin Mary

- Location within Poland
- Coordinates: 51°17′01″N 17°27′06″E
- Country: Poland
- Voivodeship: Lower Silesian
- County: Oleśnica
- Gmina: Gmina Oleśnica
- Time zone: UTC+1 (CET)
  - Summer (DST): UTC+2 (CEST)
- Vehicle registration: DOL

Brzezinka (Polish: [bʐɛˈʑiŋka]; German: Briese) is a village in the administrative district of Gmina Oleśnica, within Oleśnica County, Lower Silesian Voivodeship, in south-western Poland.

== History ==
The area became part of the emerging Polish state in the 10th century. Centuries later it passed to Bohemia (Czechia), Prussia and Germany. It became again part of Poland following Germany's defeat in World War II in 1945.
