= Bystre, Lower Silesian Voivodeship =

Bystre
- Village
- Location within Poland
- Coordinates: 51°10′52″N 17°22′05″E
- Country: Poland
- Voivodeship: Lower Silesian
- County: Oleśnica
- Gmina: Gmina Oleśnica
- Population: 164

Bystre [ˈbɨstrɛ] is a village in the administrative district of Gmina Oleśnica, within Oleśnica County, Lower Silesian Voivodeship, in south-western Poland.
