= Krzeczyn =

- Village
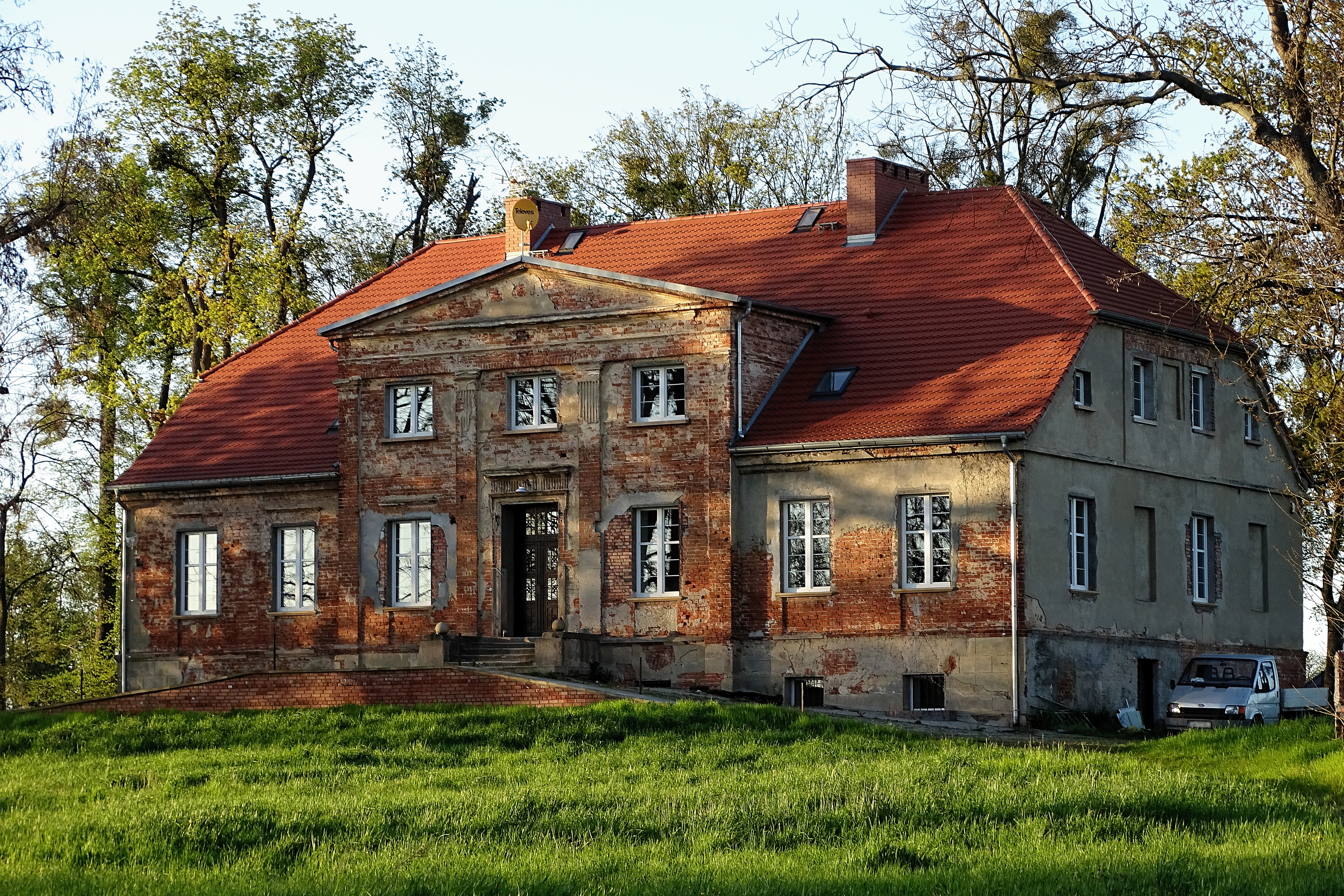
- Manor

- Location within Poland
- Coordinates: 51°09′05″N 17°20′16″E
- Country: Poland
- Voivodeship: Lower Silesian
- County: Oleśnica
- Gmina: Gmina Oleśnica

Krzeczyn [ˈkʂɛt͡ʂɨn] is a village in the administrative district of Gmina Oleśnica, within Oleśnica County, Lower Silesian Voivodeship, in south-western Poland.
