= Świerzna =

- Village
- Location within Poland
- Coordinates: 51°11′09″N 17°25′54″E
- Country: Poland
- Voivodeship: Lower Silesian
- County: Oleśnica
- Gmina: Gmina Oleśnica

Świerzna (Polish: [ˈɕfjɛʐna]) is a village in the administrative district of Gmina Oleśnica, within Oleśnica County, Lower Silesian Voivodeship, in south-western Poland.
