= Vyshhorod =

City in Kyiv Oblast, Ukraine

Vyshhorod Вишгород
- City
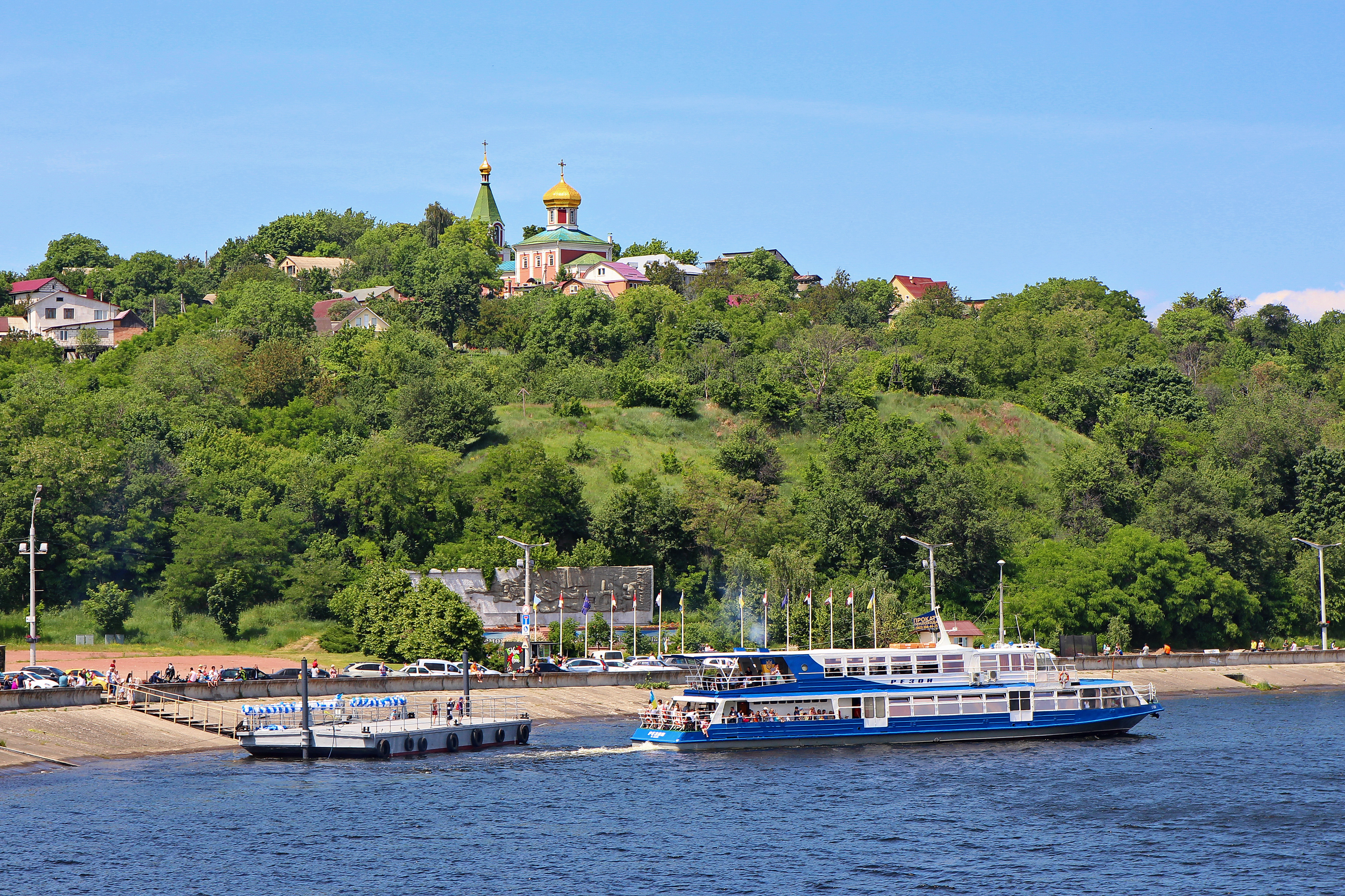
- Skyline of Vyshhorod

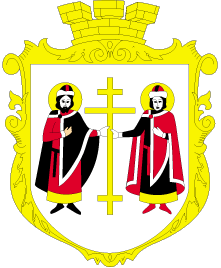
- Flag Coat of arms
- Interactive map of Vyshhorod
- Location within Kyiv Oblast Location within Ukraine
- Coordinates: 50°35′0″N 30°30′0″E
- Country: Ukraine
- Oblast: Kyiv Oblast
- Raion: Vyshhorod Raion
- Hromada: Vyshhorod urban hromada
- First mentioned: 946
- City rights: 1968

Government
  - Mayor: Oleksiy Momot

Area
  - Total: 8.7 km^{2} (3.4 sq mi)

Population (2025)
  - Total: 40,000
  - Density: 2,635/km^{2} (6,820/sq mi)
- Time zone: UTC+2 (EET)
  - Summer (DST): UTC+3 (EEST)
- Postal code: 07300 — 07304
- Area code: +380 4596
- Website: vyshgorod.osp-ua.info

Vyshhorod (Ukrainian: Вишгород, IPA: [ˈwɪʒɦorod]; Russian: Вышгород, romanized: Vyshgorod) is a city in Kyiv Oblast, central Ukraine, situated immediately north of the capital Kyiv, and part of the Kyiv metropolitan area. It is on the right (western) bank of the Dnieper river and, as the location of the Kyiv Hydroelectric Power Plant, the northern part of the city is beside the Kyiv Reservoir. It is the administrative center of Vyshhorod Raion and hosts the administration of Vyshhorod urban hromada, one of the hromadas of Ukraine.

First mentioned in the 10th century, Vyshhorod is now a notable industrial center and a growing commuter town for Kyiv. Its population is approximately 33,109 (2022 estimate).

== Geography ==
Vyshhorod is located on a hilly right bank of the Dnieper river adjoining the dam of the Kyiv Reservoir.

== History ==
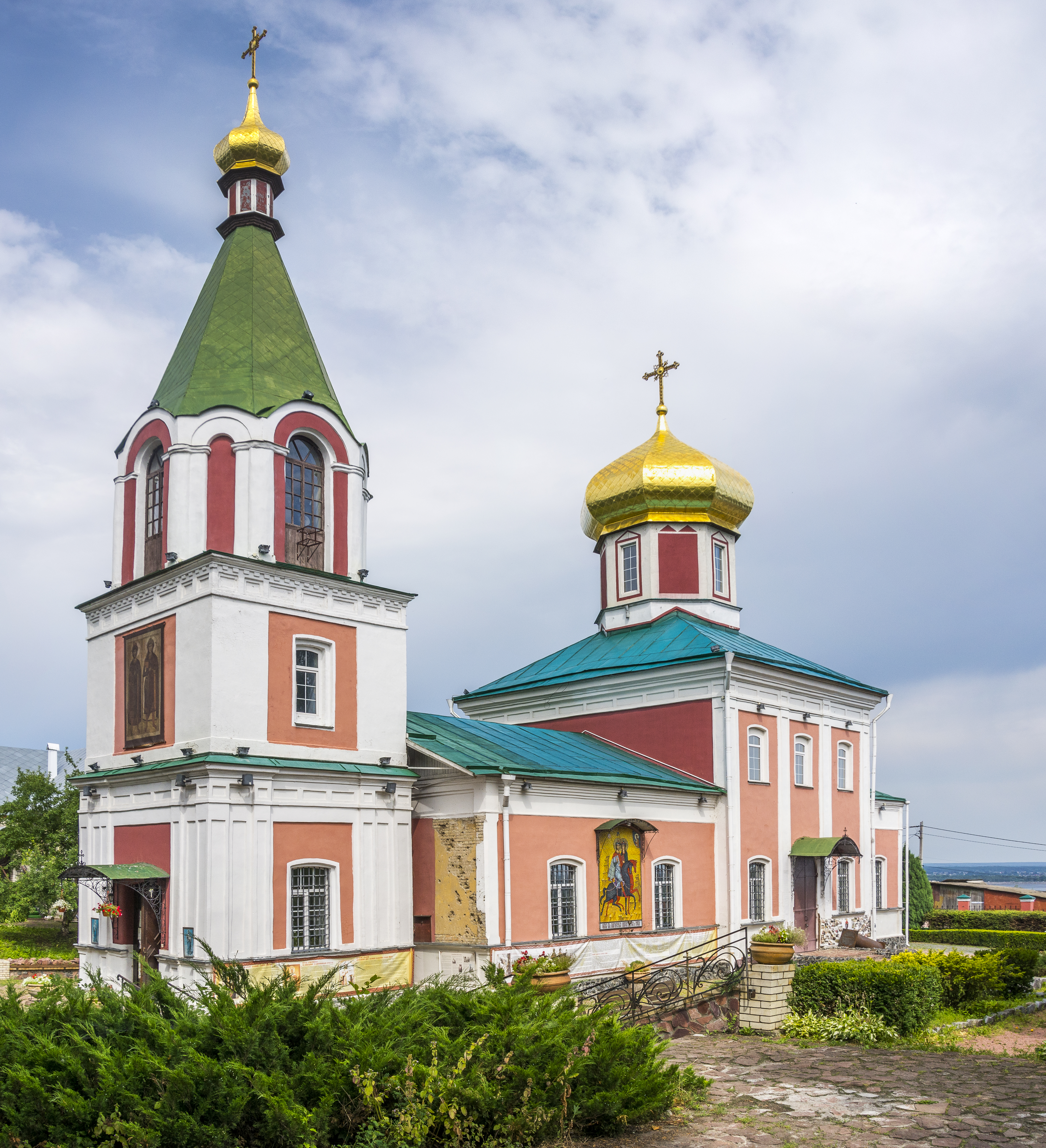
Borysohlibska Church (Church of Saints Borys and Hlib)

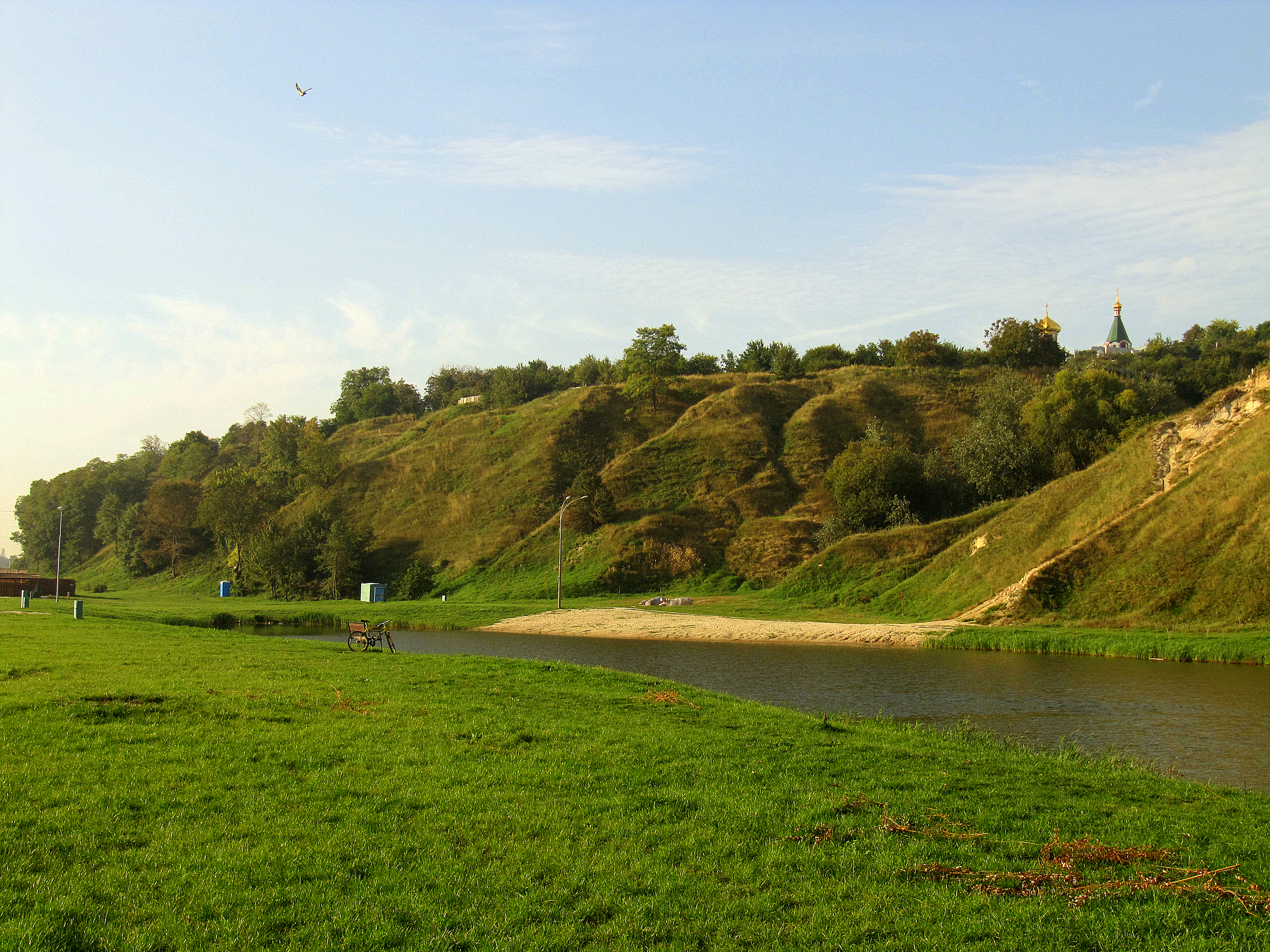
Remains of the ancient walls of Vyshhorod

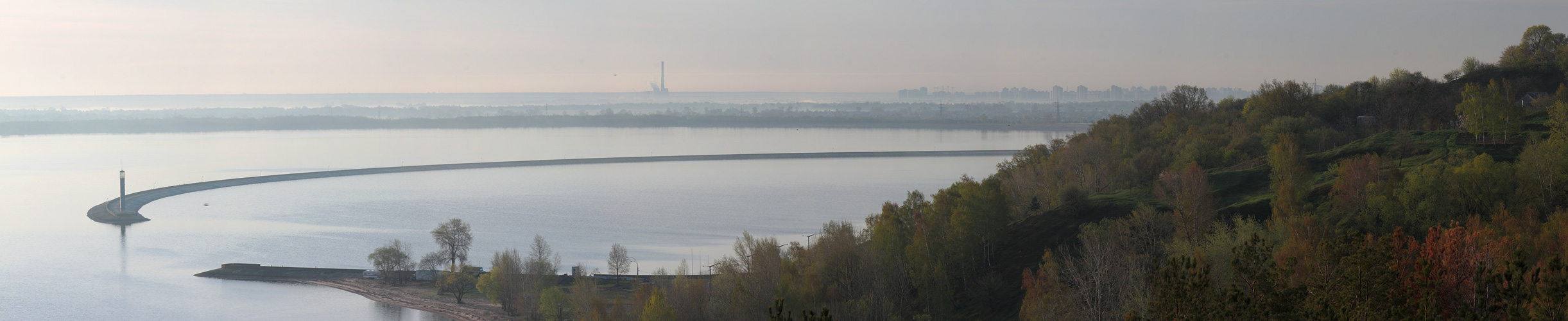
View of Kyiv Reservoir near Vyshhorod

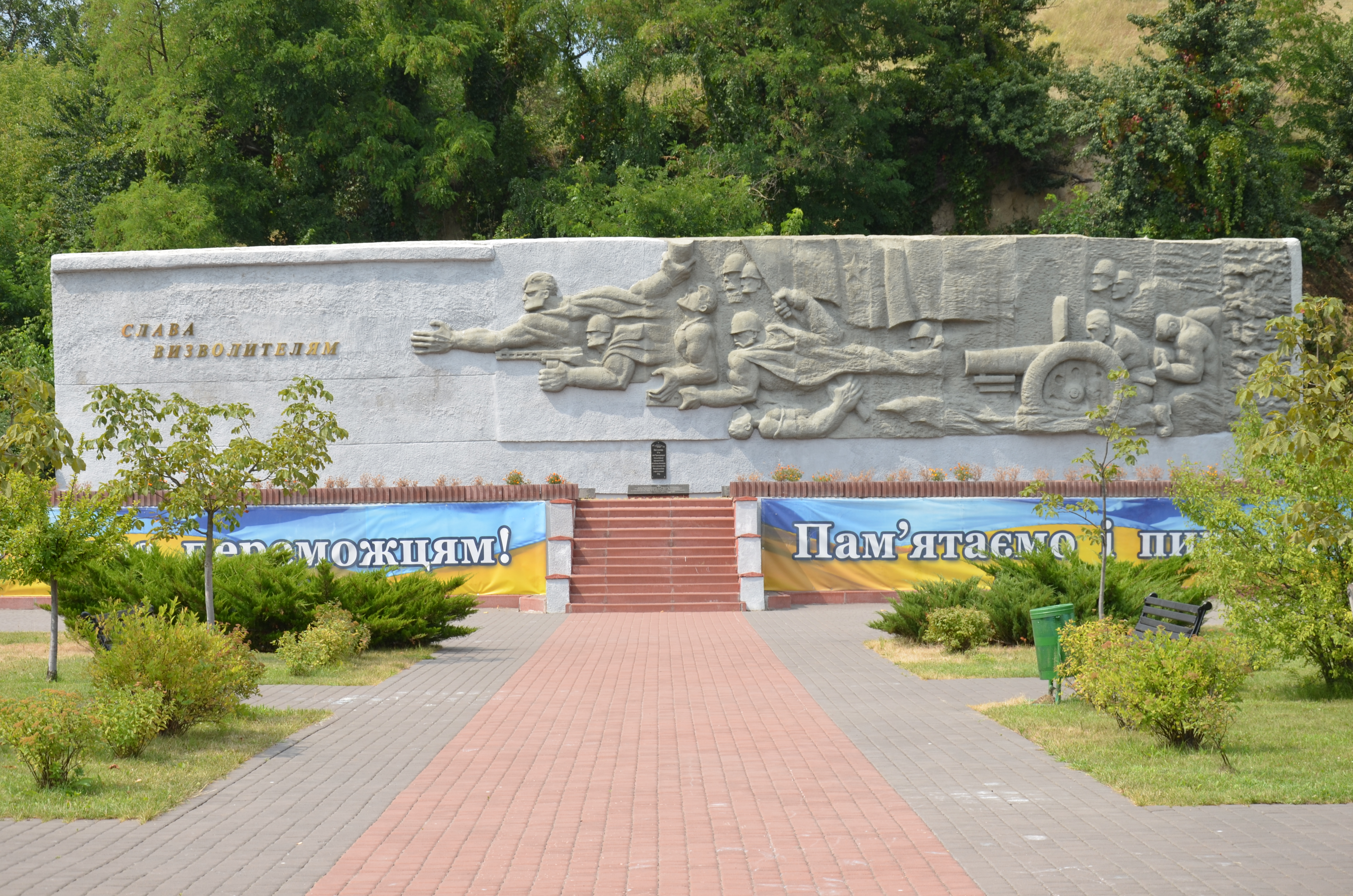
Monument in Vyshhorod WW2 museum

The earliest historical mention of Vyshhorod (the name translates as "the town upstream") dates from as early as 946 when it was described as the favourite residence of Saint Olga. Also mentioned in De Administrando Imperio, Vyshhorod served as the fortified castle and residence of the monarchs of Kievan Rus' on the Dnieper from that time until 1240, when the Mongols sacked it. At Vyshhorod Vladimir the Great (reigned 980 to 1015) kept a harem of 300 concubines. The Battle and siege of Vyshhorod took place in 1173. After the Mongol invasion of Kievan Rus', the location does not appear in the records again until 1523 – and even then it was documented as a poor village.

In 1934-37 and 1947, the archaeological remnants of the medieval town were excavated. The most striking find was the basement of the eight-pillared Church of St. Basil, founded by Vladimir the Great and named after his patron saint. As the church was one of the largest in Kievan Rus', it took twenty years to complete it. Before the Mongol invasion, the church housed the relics of the first East Slavic saints, Boris and Gleb, but their subsequent fate remains a mystery. The ancient Cossack military monastery, the Mezhyhirskyi Monastery, stood not too far away from the city.

Vyshhorod grew considerably following the construction of the hydroelectric Kyiv power plant and was incorporated as a town in 1968.

== Industry ==
Vyshhorod has more than 1,500 enterprises and companies, the most important being the Kyiv Hydroelectric Power Plant, the Kyiv Pumped Storage Power Plant (both operated by Ukrhydroenergo) and a building materials factory owned by German firm Henkel.

== Transportation ==
Vyshhorod is connected to Kyiv and other localities mainly by roads. There is also a non-electrified terminus rail connection to Kyiv used for both freight transport and peak hour commuter passenger service. The city's river port facilities are used for local industrial purposes only. Jitney buses run between Vyshhorod and the Heroiv Dnipra station of the Kyiv Metro's Obolonsko–Teremkivska line.

== Demographics ==
As of the 2001 Ukrainian census, Vyshhorod counted a population of 22,867. The population is ethnically overwhelmingly Ukrainian, but also contains significant minority groups from the Post-Soviet Realm, such as ethnic Russians, Belarusians and Armenians, as well as a small Polish community. The exact ethnic and linguitic composition was as follows:

Ethnic groups in Vyshhorod
	percent
Ukrainians	83.33%
Russians	14.35%
Belarusians	1.01%
Armenians	0.28%
Poles	0.18%
Jews	0.14%
Tatars	0.13%
Georgians	0.06%
Moldovans	0.06%
others	0.46%

Native languages in Vyshhorod
	percent
Ukrainian	77.3%
Russian	22.1%
Belarusian	0.3%
Armenian	0.1%
others	0.2%

== Sports ==
In 2011, Vyshhorod was the first Ukrainian city to host the F1 Powerboat World Championship motorboat race.

== Twin towns – sister cities ==
Vyshhorod is twinned with:

- Delčevo, North Macedonia
- Eichenau, Germany
- Kaniv, Ukraine
- Lörrach, Germany
- Rakvere, Estonia
- Sens, France
- Wyszków, Poland

== See also ==
- Visegrad, towns with similar names
- VyshHora
