= Bogusławice, Oleśnica County =

Bogusławice
- Village
- Location within Poland
- Coordinates: 51°12′18″N 17°27′20″E
- Country: Poland
- Voivodeship: Lower Silesian
- County: Oleśnica
- Gmina: Gmina Oleśnica

Bogusławice [bɔɡuswaˈvit͡sɛ] is a village in the administrative district of Gmina Oleśnica, within Oleśnica County, Lower Silesian Voivodeship, in south-western Poland.
