= Jenkowice, Oleśnica County =

Jenkowice
- Village
- Location within Poland
- Coordinates: 51°13′53″N 17°19′27″E
- Country: Poland
- Voivodeship: Lower Silesian
- County: Oleśnica
- Gmina: Gmina Oleśnica

Jenkowice [jɛnkɔˈvit͡sɛ] is a village in the administrative district of Gmina Oleśnica, within Oleśnica County, Lower Silesian Voivodeship, in south-western Poland.
