= Nowa Ligota =

- Village
- Location within Poland
- Coordinates: 51°08′10″N 17°24′36″E
- Country: Poland
- Voivodeship: Lower Silesian
- County: Oleśnica
- Gmina: Gmina Oleśnica

Nowa Ligota [ˈnɔva liˈɡɔta] is a village in the administrative district of Gmina Oleśnica, within Oleśnica County, Lower Silesian Voivodeship, in south-western Poland. As of 2011, the village had a population of 76.
