= Boguszyce, Oleśnica County =

Boguszyce
- Village
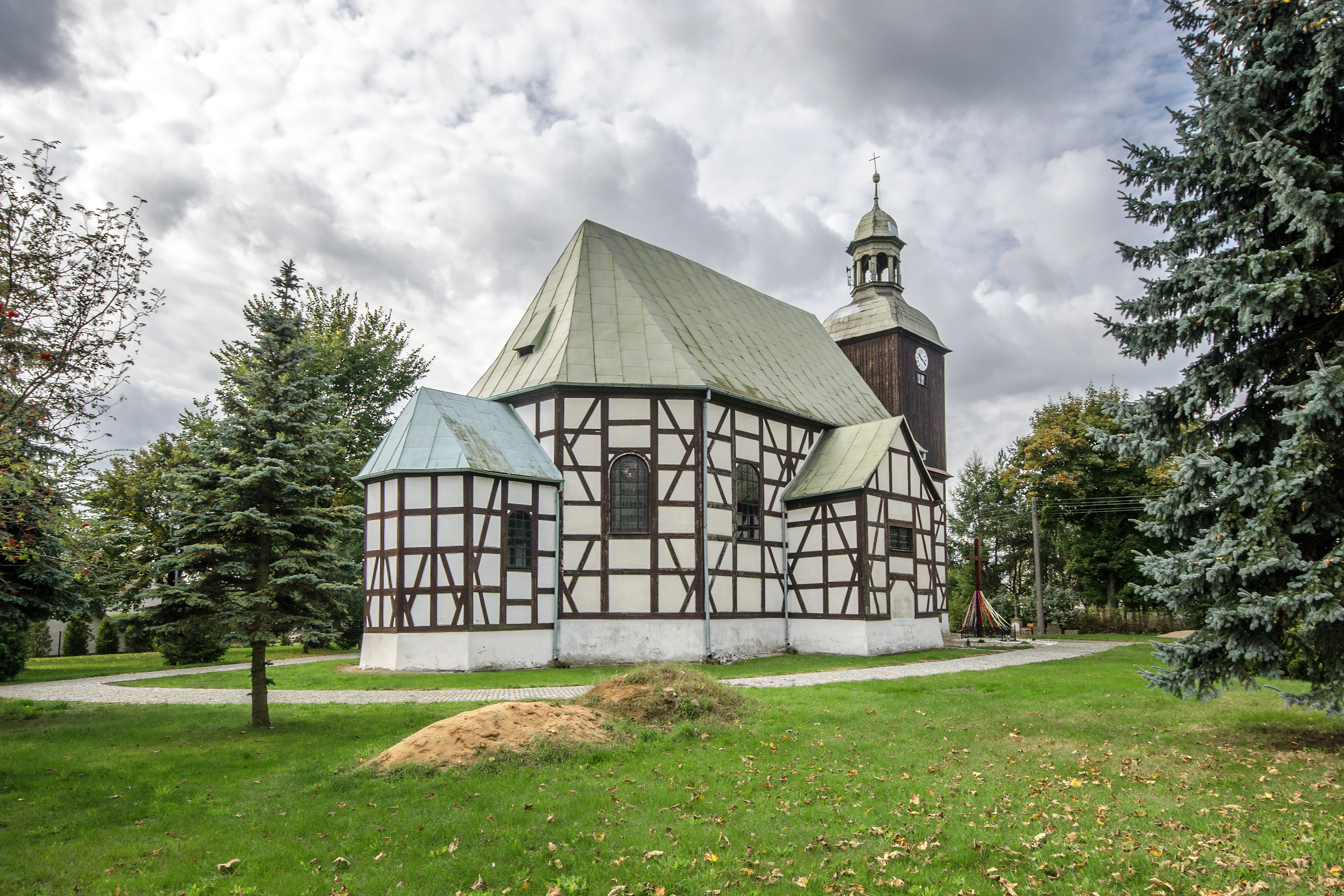
- Our Lady of Perpetual Help Church

- Location within Poland
- Coordinates: 51°14′45″N 17°23′43″E
- Country: Poland
- Voivodeship: Lower Silesian
- County: Oleśnica
- Gmina: Gmina Oleśnica

Boguszyce [bɔɡuˈʂɨt͡sɛ] is a village in the administrative district of Gmina Oleśnica, within Oleśnica County, Lower Silesian Voivodeship, in south-western Poland.

== History ==
Boguszyce formerly belonged to the church district of Oleśnica. From 1538 onward it was a Protestant community. The church was built in 1712 to 1714. It still exists and its interior is more or less unchanged, except for adapting it to the now Catholic belief.

The number of inhabitants changed little since the 19th century:

- 1867: 675 inhabitants
- 1871: 679 inhabitants, 106 houses and 139 households. There was also a coffee house and a chemist.
- 1905: 572 inhabitants (of them 554 Protestant, 18 Catholic) in 87 houses and 135 households
- 1925: 714 inhabitants
- 1939: 704 inhabitants in 202 households

Boguszyce lies approximately 6 kilometres (4 mi) north of Oleśnica, and 29 kilometres (18 mi) north-east of the regional capital Wrocław.
