= Wszechświęte, Lower Silesian Voivodeship =

Wszechświęte
- Village
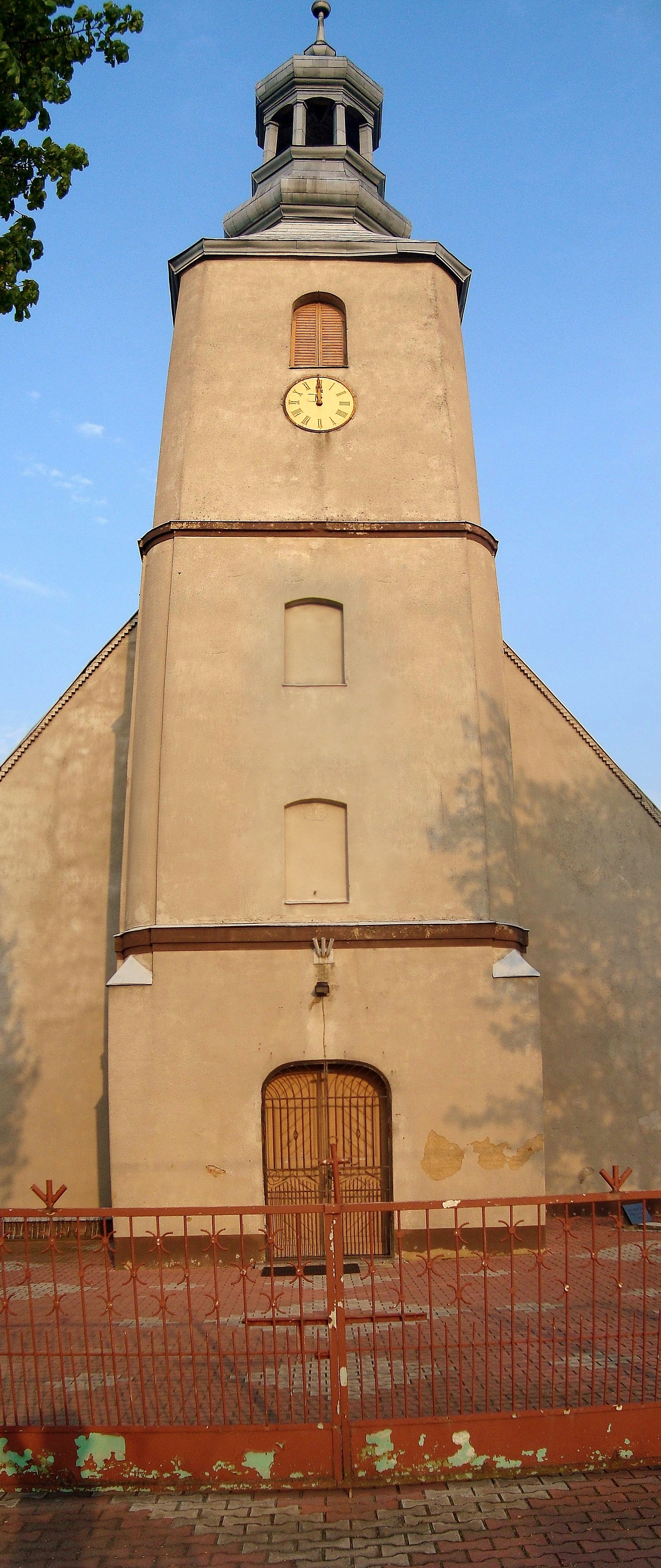
- Our Lady of Częstochowa church in Wszechświęte

- Location within Poland
- Coordinates: 51°11′30″N 17°29′05″E
- Country: Poland
- Voivodeship: Lower Silesian
- County: Oleśnica
- Gmina: Gmina Oleśnica
- First mentioned: 1317

Area
  - Total: 3,986 km^{2} (1,539 sq mi)
- Elevation: 126 m (413 ft)

Population
  - Total: 235
- Time zone: UTC+1 (CET)
  - Summer (DST): UTC+2 (CEST)
- Postal code: 56-400
- Vehicle registration: DOL

Wszechświęte [fʂɛxɕˈfjɛntɛ] is a village in the administrative district of Gmina Oleśnica, within Oleśnica County, Lower Silesian Voivodeship, in south-western Poland. The village lies approximately 8 kilometers (5 mi) east from Oleśnica.

== Organizations ==
In the village there are three organizations

- Folk music band "Wianki" ("Wreaths")
- Volunteer fire department
- Football team

== Area ==
Wszechświęte occupies an area of 398.55 hectares (984.8 acres), of which 358.48 hectares (885.8 acres) is agricultural land. It consists of:

- arable land – 311.91 hectares (770.7 acres)
- meadows – 31.75 hectares (78.5 acres)
- pastures – 12.81 hectares (31.7 acres)
- orchards – 2.01 hectares (5.0 acres)
- built-up areas – 10.49 hectares (25.9 acres)
- forests – 7.77 hectares (19.2 acres)
- water – 3.54 hectares (8.7 acres)
- road – 16.59 hectares (41.0 acres)
- waste land – 1.60 hectares (4.0 acres)

== Names ==
Village has changed names three times over the years:

- 1317 – Omnium Sanctorum (Latin for All Saints)
- 1376 – Alle Heilig (German: All Saints)
- 1785 – Allerheiligen

== History ==
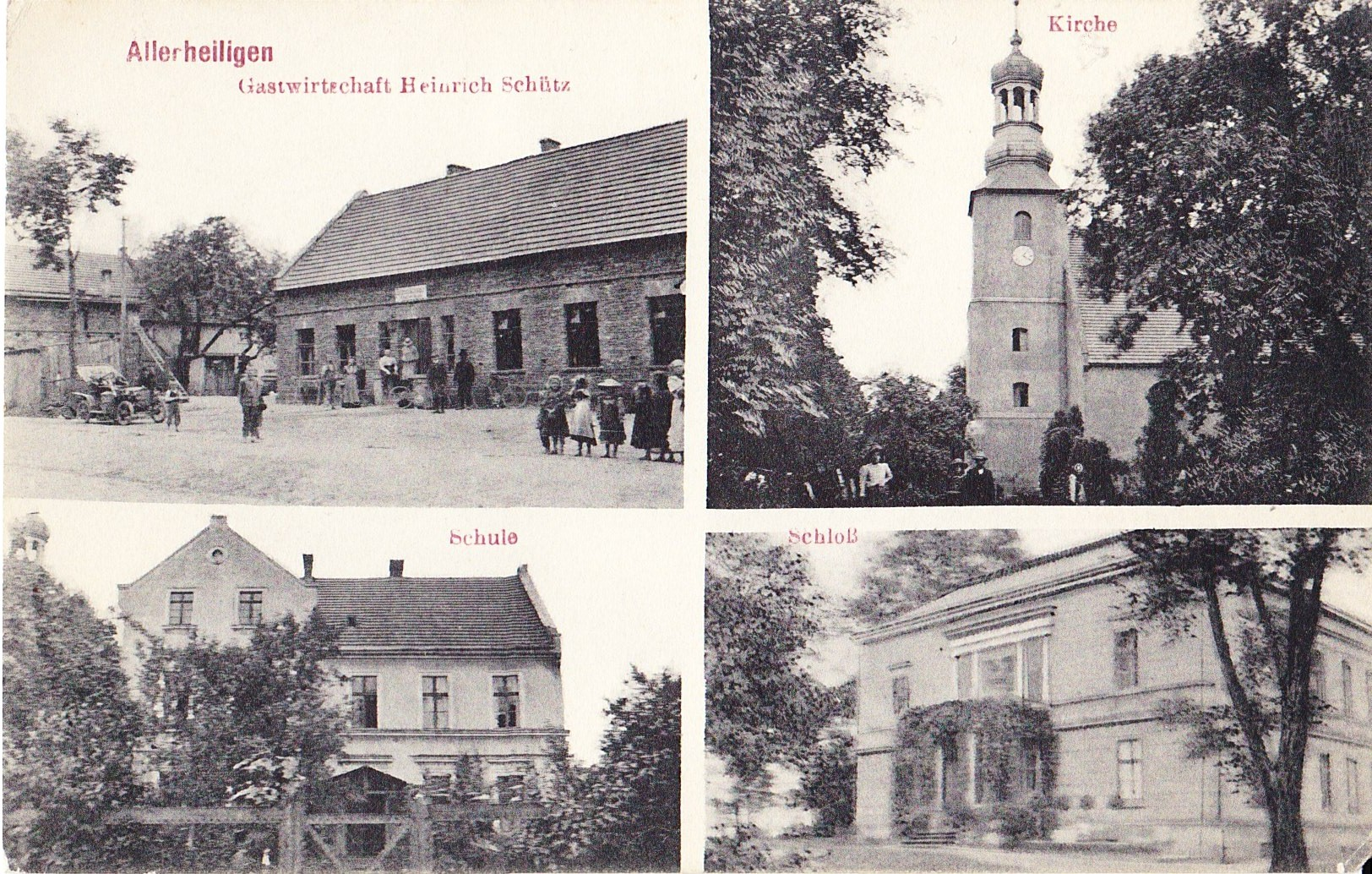
Postcard from Wszechświęte of 1930

- 1317 – first mention. Berold, the parish priest in the village Wszechświęte was mentioned in a document concerning a dispute about tithes
- 1376 – village mentioned, as established under German law
- 1380 – in the village was a manor owned by Pecko Krompusch
- 1597 – the evangelical minister Bartolomeus Glassius was mentioned
- 1705 – old church was completely rebuilt (realized by evangelical community)
- 1785 – in the village school and folwark began to operate. The village had 143 inhabitants, 3 farmstead farms, 13 farmsteads, 3 cottages
- 1819 – Von Hautcharmoi sold his fortune to von Schickfus family
- 1845 – the owner of the village was a deputy of the court in Oleśnica – Gustaw Moritz von Schickfus. There were parish, a palace, a windmill, a horse-powered mill in the village. All 27 farms were inhabited by 281 people (3 Catholics, 7 Judaists) of which 15 craftsmen and tradesmen. In the village there was an evangelical school.
- 1874 – in the village were 24 farms, inhabited by 149 people (9 Catholics).
- 1860 – building of the palace, and establishment of the park
- 1876 – estate was owned by Hermann von Wiessel. The estate covered 236 hectares (580 acres) of land
- 1891 – the next owner of the estate was Dr. Phil Kurt Seidler
- 1908 – village had 30 houses, 189 inhabitants (23 Catholics)
- 1909 – the property was in the hands of the lawyer and deputy district, Wilhelm Krüger. The property area covered 300 hectares (740 acres) of land, including a park and garden of 6 hectares (15 acres), 4 hectares (9.9 acres) of farmland. The owner also had a distillery and sugar factory. This state lasted until 1945
- after 1945 – the property was parceled out between the individual users
