= Osada Leśna, Lower Silesian Voivodeship =

Osada Leśna
- Village
- Location within Poland
- Coordinates: 51°13′59″N 17°35′43″E
- Country: Poland
- Voivodeship: Lower Silesian
- County: Oleśnica
- Gmina: Gmina Oleśnica

Osada Leśna [ɔˈsada ˈlɛɕna] is a village in the administrative district of Gmina Oleśnica, within Oleśnica County, Lower Silesian Voivodeship, in south-western Poland.
