= Zimnica, Lower Silesian Voivodeship =

Zimnica
- Village
- Location within Poland
- Coordinates: 51°09′16″N 17°23′32″E
- Country: Poland
- Voivodeship: Lower Silesian
- County: Oleśnica
- Gmina: Gmina Oleśnica

Zimnica [ʑimˈnit͡sa] is a village in the administrative district of Gmina Oleśnica, within Oleśnica County, Lower Silesian Voivodeship, in south-western Poland.
