= Nowoszyce, Zgorzelec County =

Nowoszyce
- Village
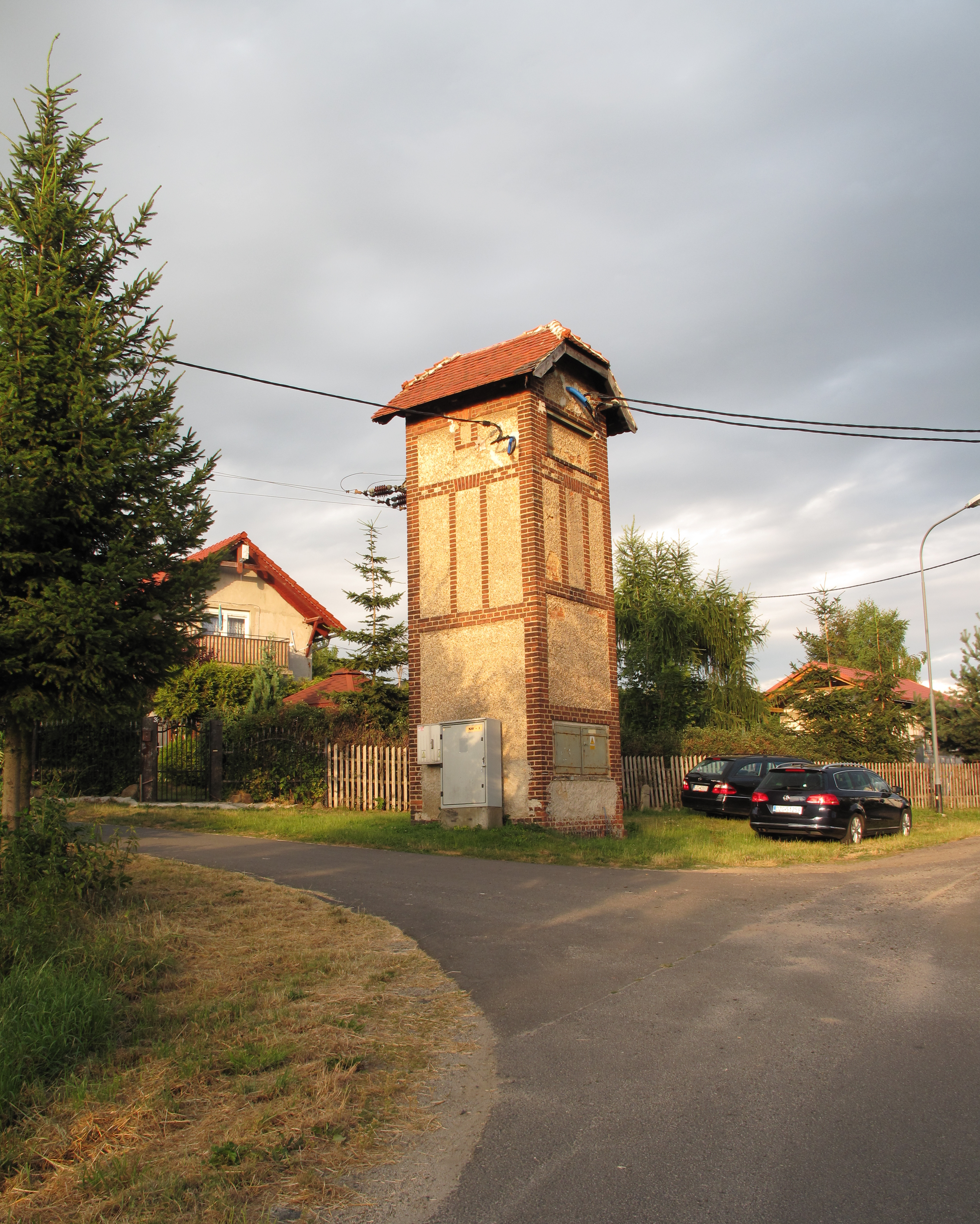
- Electric tower

- Location within Poland
- Coordinates: 51°02′28″N 15°07′07″E
- Country: Poland
- Voivodeship: Lower Silesian
- County: Zgorzelec
- Gmina: Sulików

Nowoszyce [nɔvɔˈʂɨt͡sɛ] is a village in the administrative district of Gmina Sulików, within Zgorzelec County, Lower Silesian Voivodeship, in south-western Poland, close to the Czech border.

== Gallery ==
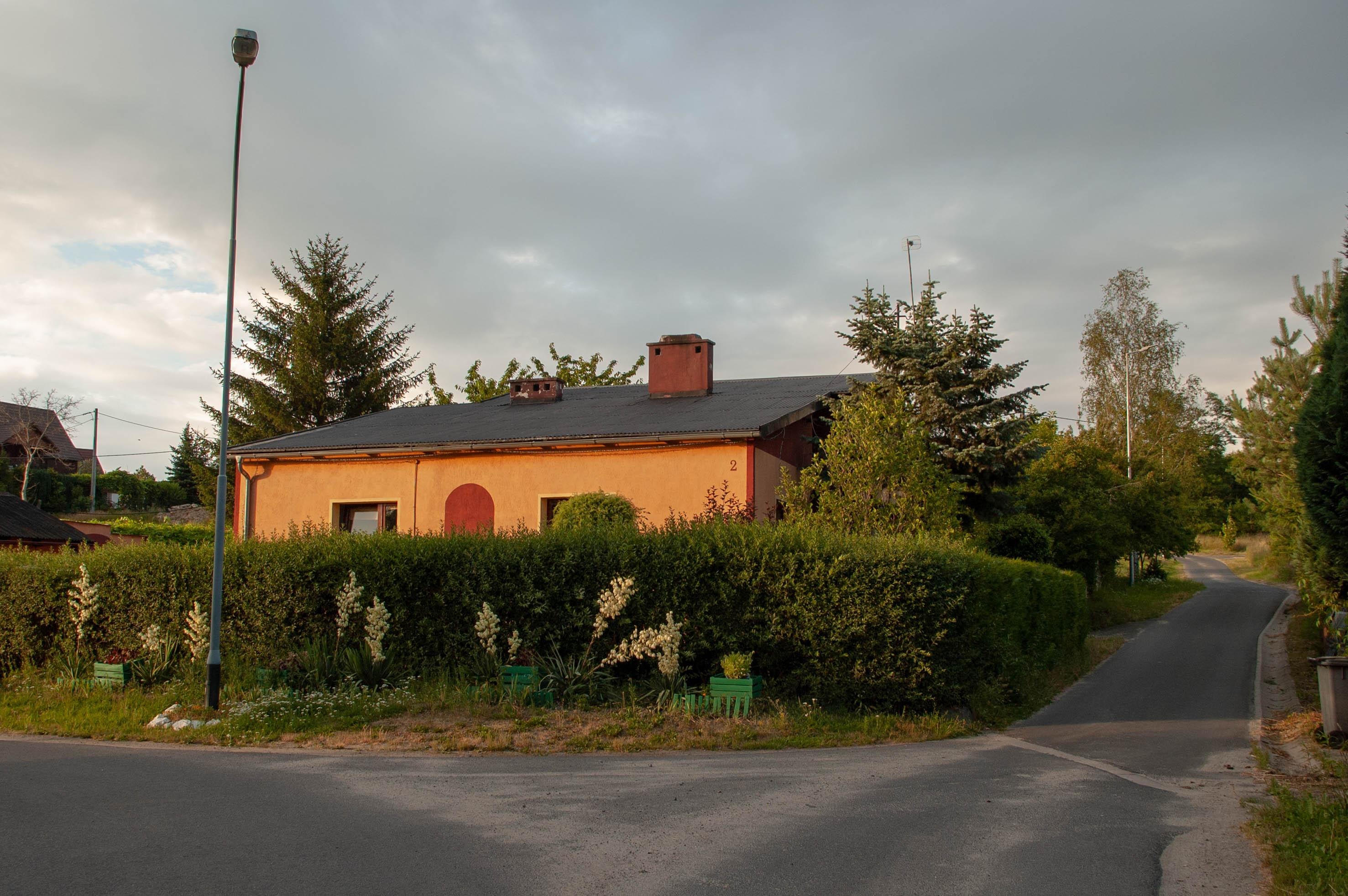
House

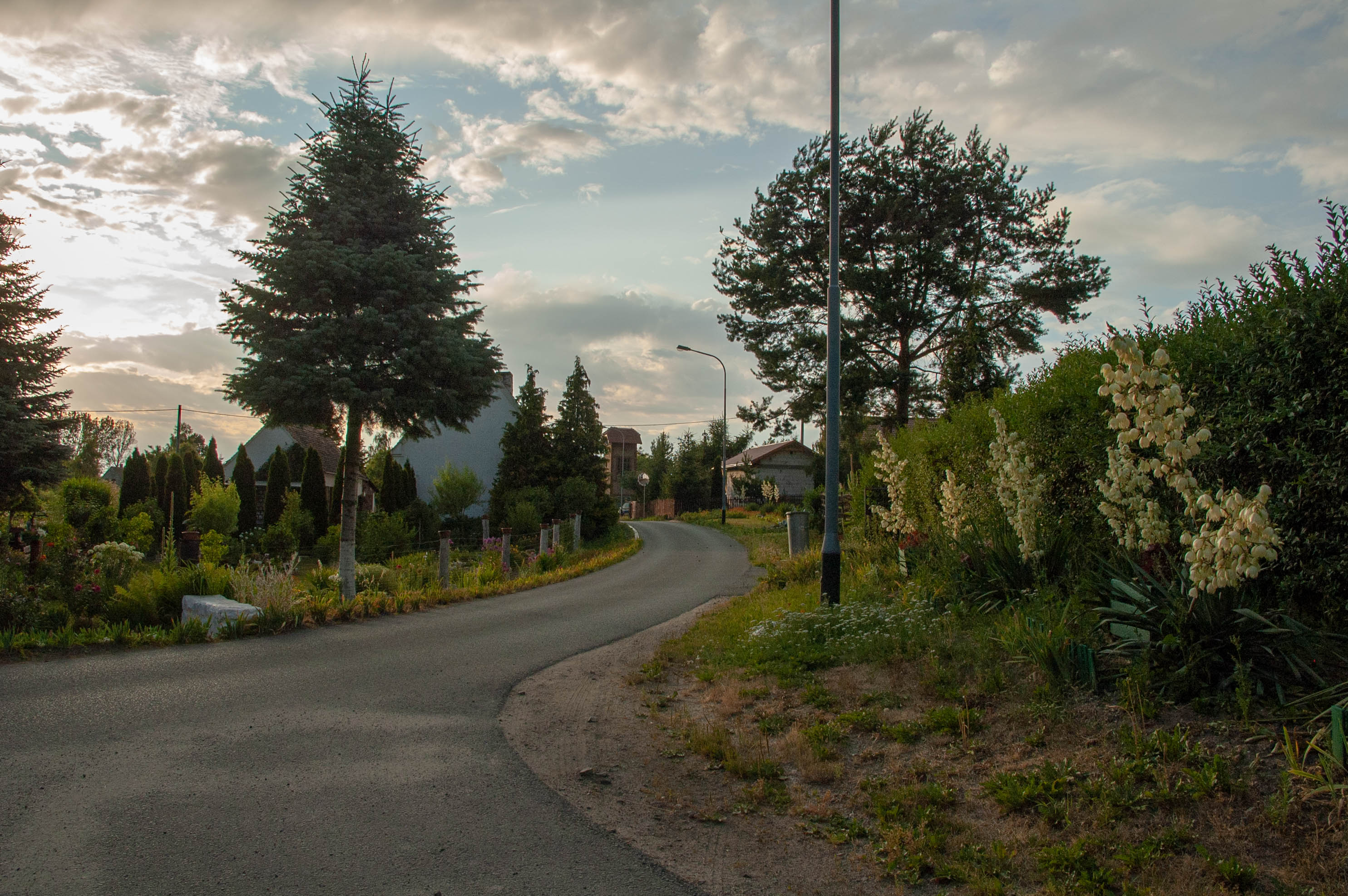
Road
