= Ligota Mała, Oleśnica County =

Ligota Mała
- Village
- Location within Poland
- Coordinates: 51°9′N 17°22′E
- Country: Poland
- Voivodeship: Lower Silesian
- County: Oleśnica
- Gmina: Gmina Oleśnica

Ligota Mała [liˈɡɔta ˈmawa] is a village in the administrative district of Gmina Oleśnica, within Oleśnica County, Lower Silesian Voivodeship, in south-western Poland.
