= Gręboszyce =

- Village
- Location within Poland
- Coordinates: 51°10′05″N 17°26′50″E
- Country: Poland
- Voivodeship: Lower Silesian
- County: Oleśnica
- Gmina: Gmina Oleśnica

Gręboszyce [ɡrɛmbɔˈʂɨt͡sɛ] is a village in the administrative district of Gmina Oleśnica, within Oleśnica County, Lower Silesian Voivodeship, in southwestern Poland.
