= Smardzów, Oleśnica County =

Smardzów
- Village
- Location within Poland
- Coordinates: 51°12′06″N 17°19′35″E
- Country: Poland
- Voivodeship: Lower Silesian
- County: Oleśnica
- Gmina: Gmina Oleśnica

Smardzów [ˈsmard͡zuf] is a village in the administrative district of Gmina Oleśnica, within Oleśnica County, Lower Silesian Voivodeship, in south-western Poland.
