= Brzezia Łąka =

- Village
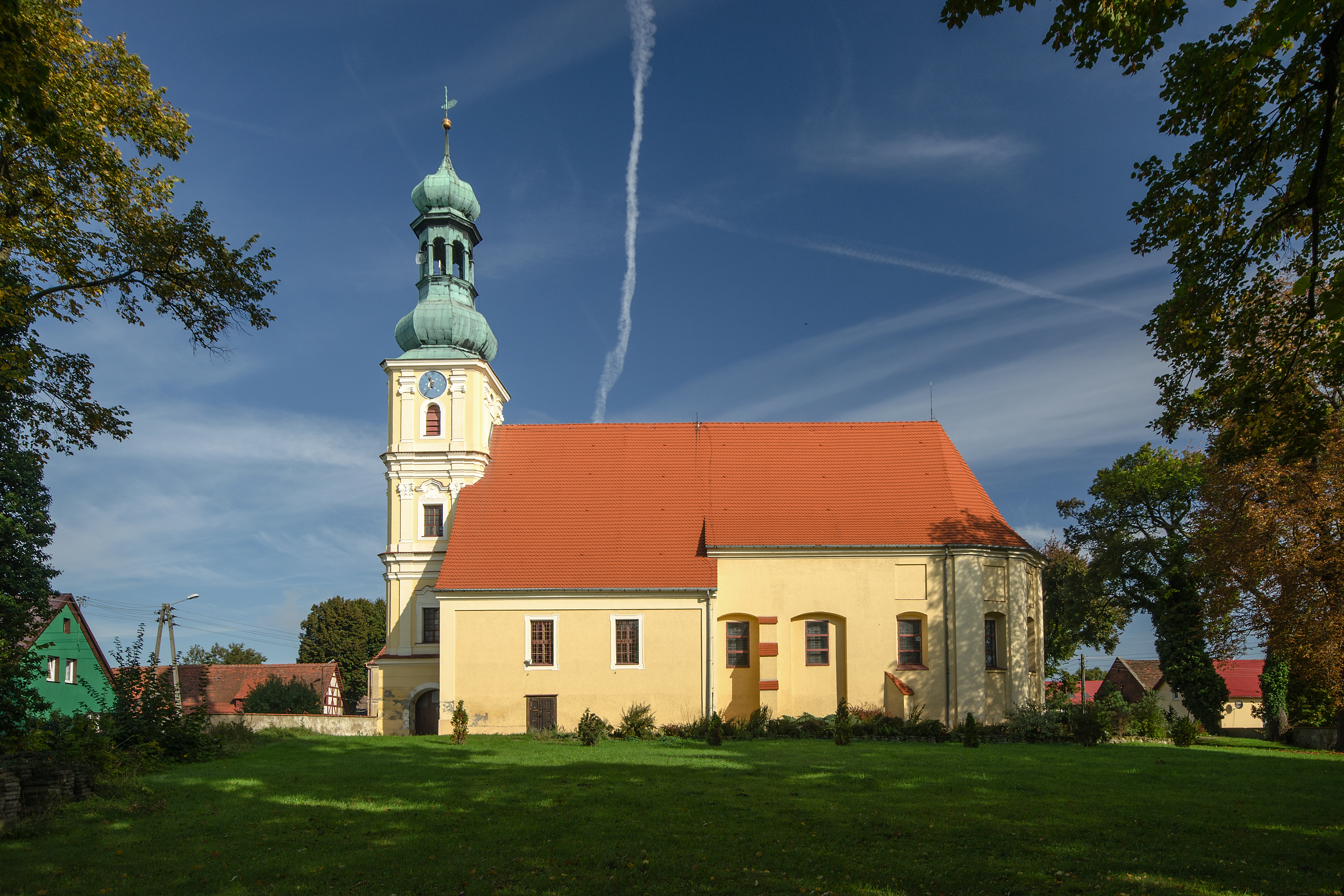
- Catholic church

- Location within Poland
- Coordinates: 51°7′N 17°15′E
- Country: Poland
- Voivodeship: Lower Silesian
- County: Wrocław
- Gmina: Długołęka

Brzezia Łąka [ˈbʐɛʑa ˈwɔŋka] is a village in the administrative district of Gmina Długołęka, within Wrocław County, Lower Silesian Voivodeship, in south-western Poland.
