= Nowoszyce, Oleśnica County =

Nowoszyce
- Village
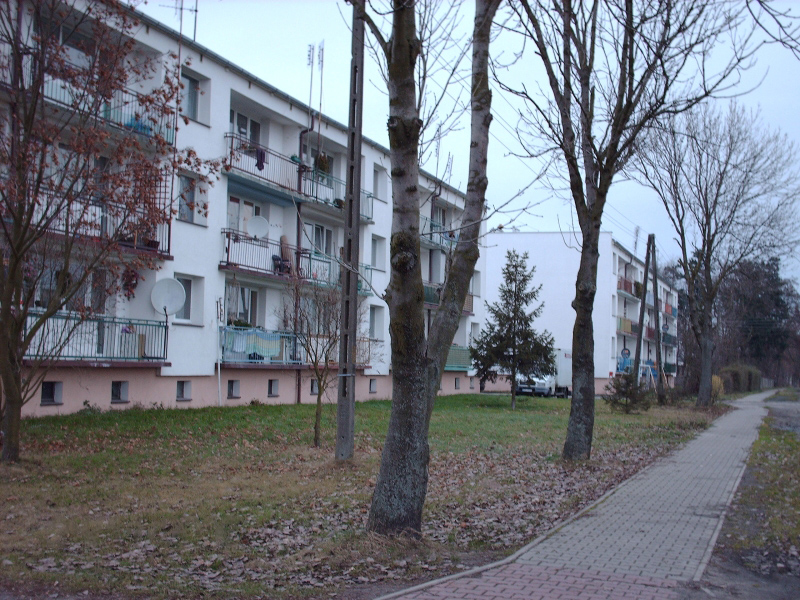

- Location within Poland
- Coordinates: 51°11′10″N 17°28′2″E
- Country: Poland
- Voivodeship: Lower Silesian
- County: Oleśnica
- Gmina: Gmina Oleśnica

Nowoszyce [nɔvɔˈʂɨt͡sɛ] is a village in the administrative district of Gmina Oleśnica, within Oleśnica County, Lower Silesian Voivodeship, in south-western Poland.
