= Wyszogród, Lower Silesian Voivodeship =

Wyszogród
- Village
- Location within Poland
- Coordinates: 51°11′57″N 17°28′22″E
- Country: Poland
- Voivodeship: Lower Silesian
- County: Oleśnica
- Gmina: Gmina Oleśnica
- Time zone: UTC+1 (CET)
  - Summer (DST): UTC+2 (CEST)
- Vehicle registration: DOL

Wyszogród [vɨˈʂɔɡrut] is a village in the administrative district of Gmina Oleśnica, within Oleśnica County, Lower Silesian Voivodeship, in south-western Poland.

The name of the village is of Polish origin and comes from the words wysoki gród, which mean "high stronghold", referring to the elevation of the village.
