= Sokołowice, Lower Silesian Voivodeship =

Sokołowice
- Village
- Location within Poland
- Coordinates: 51°15′N 17°27′E
- Country: Poland
- Voivodeship: Lower Silesian
- County: Oleśnica
- Gmina: Gmina Oleśnica
- Population: 950
- Time zone: UTC+1 (CET)
  - Summer (DST): UTC+2 (CEST)
- Post Code: 56-400
- Area code: (+48) 71
- Vehicle registration: DOL

Sokołowice [sɔkɔwɔˈvit͡sɛ] is a village in the administrative district of Gmina Oleśnica, within Oleśnica County, Lower Silesian Voivodeship, in south-western Poland.

The name of the village is of Polish origin and comes from the word sokół, which means "falcon".
