= Visegrad =

Visegrad or Višegrad, meaning in Slavic languages the "upper town" (or "acropolis"), may refer to:

== Places ==
- Visegrád, a town and castle in Hungary
- Višegrad, a town and municipality in Republika Srpska, Bosnia and Herzegovina
- Višegrad (Bistrički), a fortress on the river Bistrica in Kosovo
- Višegrad (Nišavski), a fortress on the river Nišava in Serbia
- Vishegrad, Kardzhali Province, a village in Bulgaria
- Vishegrad, the highest peak of Sakar Mountain in Bulgaria
- Vyšehrad, a castle in Prague, Czech Republic
  - Vyšehrad, the surrounding district of Prague
  - Vyšehrad (Prague Metro), the nearby metro station

== Other uses ==
- Visegrád 24, a Polish social media account that reports current events
- The Visegrád Group, a cultural and political alliance between the Czech Republic, Hungary, Poland, and Slovakia
- The Visegrád Privilege, an important document of the Republic of Dubrovnik
- Vyšehrad, the first movement of Má vlast, a cycle of six symphonic poems by Bedřich Smetana

== See also ==
- Vyshgorod (disambiguation)
- Wyszogród (disambiguation)
