= Smolna, Lower Silesian Voivodeship =

Smolna
- Village
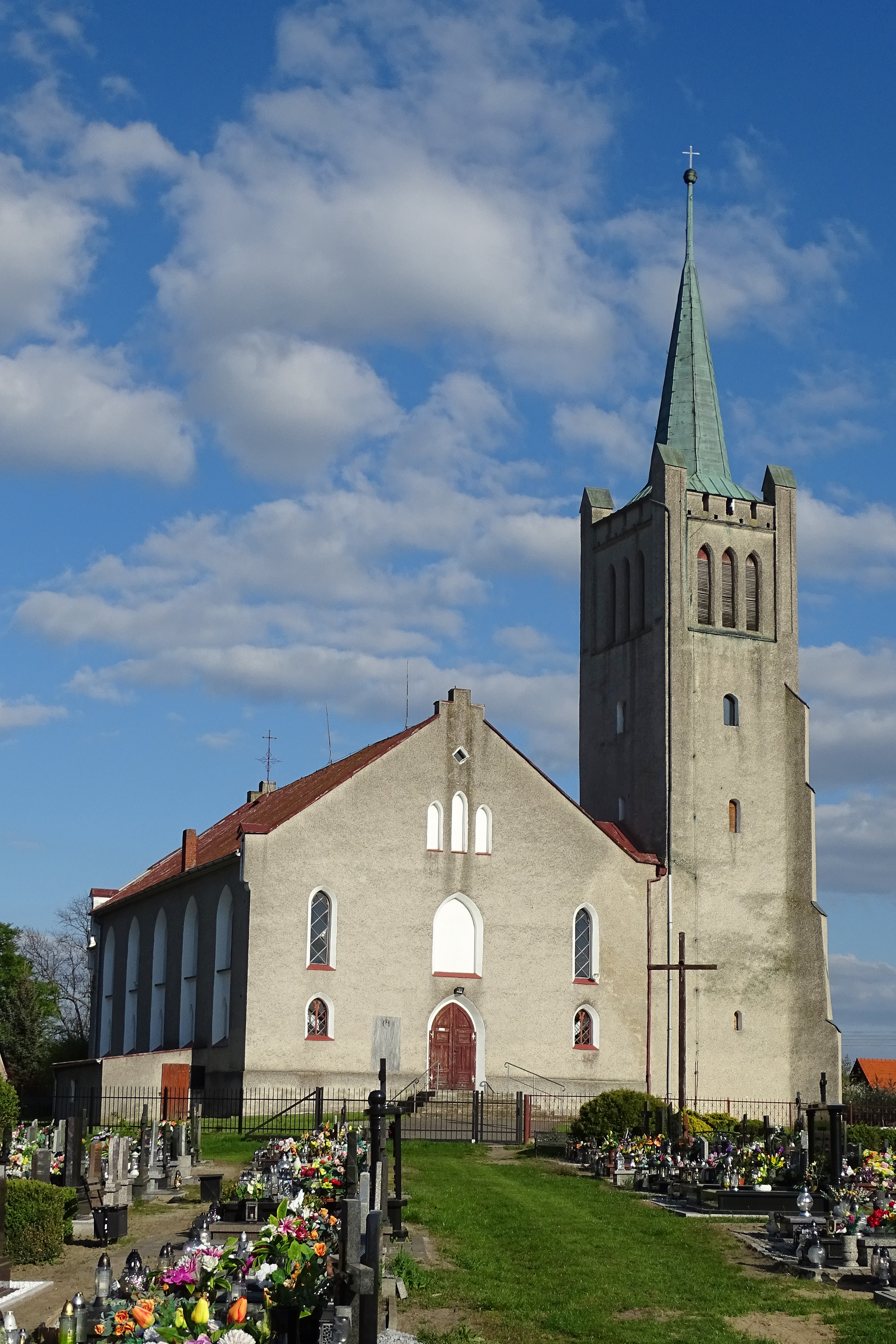
- Church in Smolna

- Location within Poland
- Coordinates: 51°9′N 17°25′E
- Country: Poland
- Voivodeship: Lower Silesian
- County: Oleśnica
- Gmina: Gmina Oleśnica

Smolna [ˈsmɔlna] is a village in the administrative district of Gmina Oleśnica, within Oleśnica County, Lower Silesian Voivodeship, in south-western Poland.
