= Widawa =

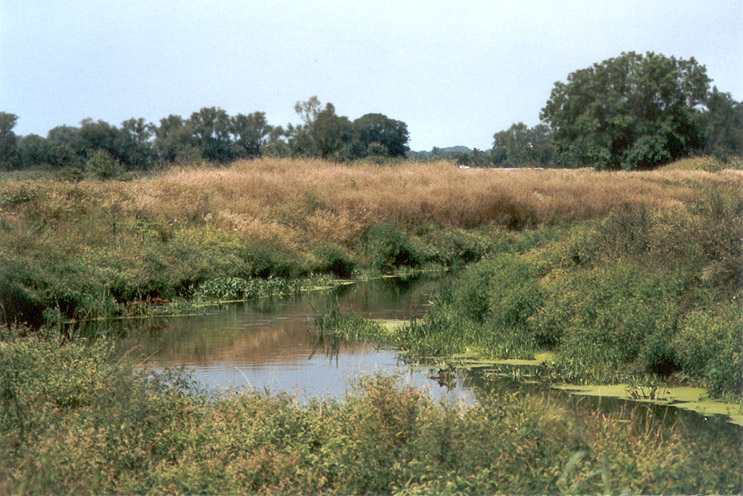
- The Widawa near Wrocław

Location
- Country: Poland

Physical characteristics
- Mouth
  - location: Oder
  - coordinates: 51.199°N 16.9187°E

Basin features
- Progression: Oder→ Baltic Sea

The Widawa (German: Weide) is a river in Poland, a right-bank tributary of the Oder River.

Towns along the Widawa include Namysłów, Bierutów, and Wrocław.

== History ==
During the 1997 Central European flood the water level of the Widawa reached 36 times its normal level.
