= House of Dyhrn =

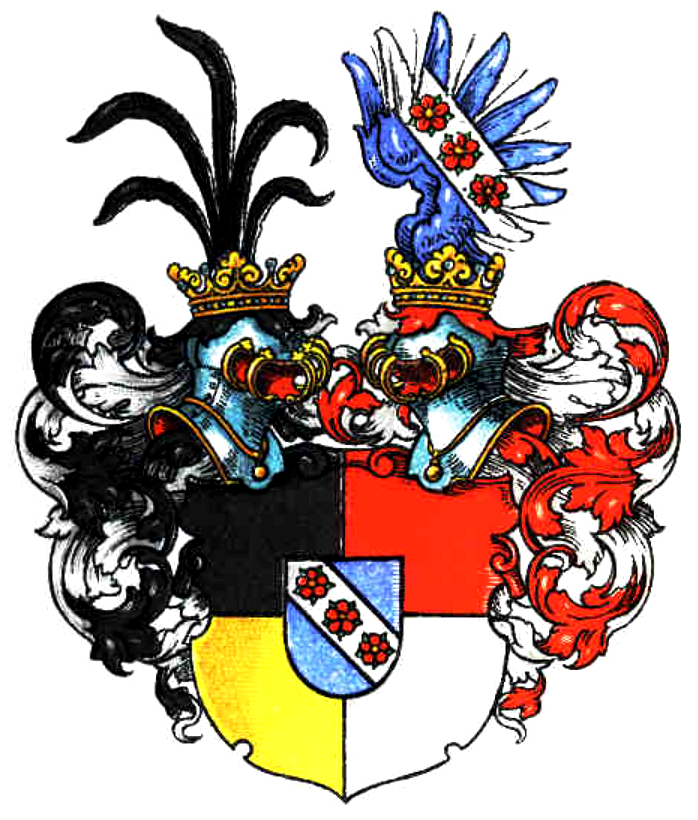
Arms of the Barons of Dyhrn

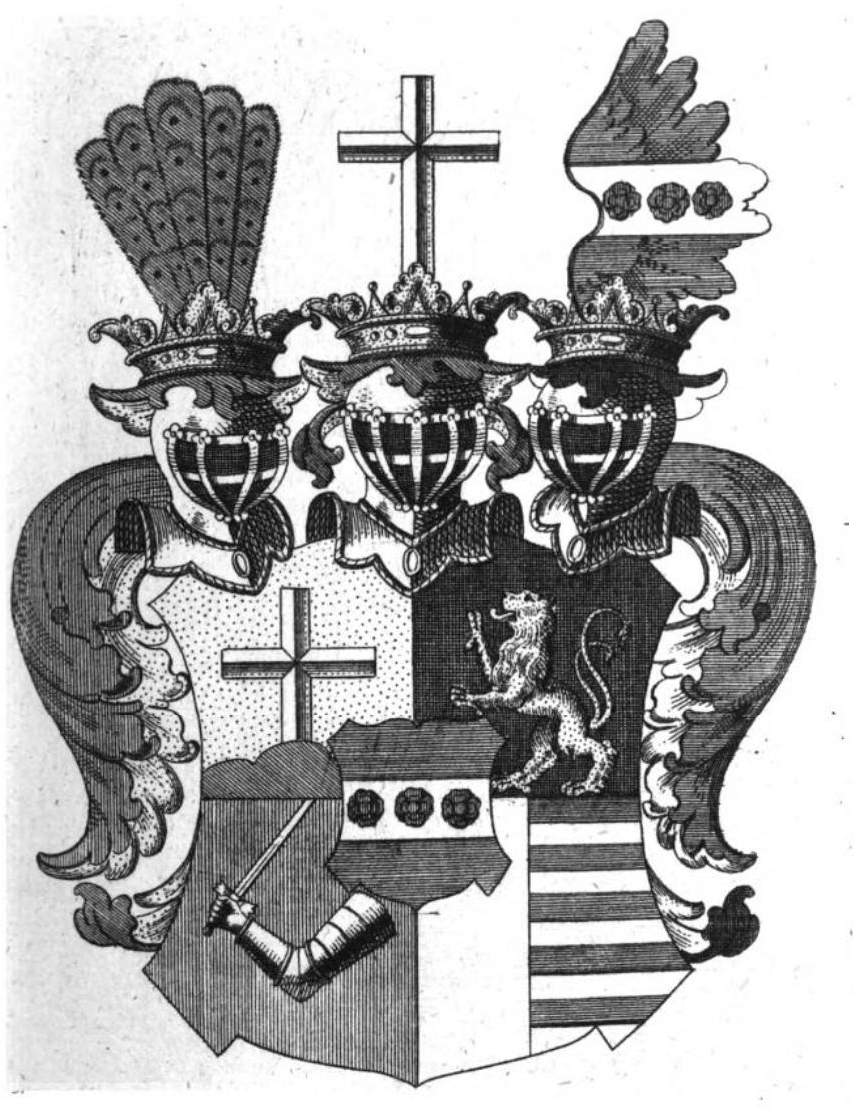
Arms of the Counts of Dyhrn

The Dyhrn family is an old German noble family originally from Saxony.

== History ==
The family was first mentioned in the 13th century and settled at an early stage in Prussia and Silesia. It was one of the most important, oldest and richest noble families of the Kingdom of Prussia.

The Dyhrn family had an important role in Silesian industry in the 18th and 19th centuries. It was known not just as the owner of several manufactures and mines, but also as one of the biggest landowners in Silesia.

== The Barons and Counts of Dyhrn ==
The Lords of Dyhrn gained the title of Baron (Reichsfreiherr) in the 17th century from the Habsburg Monarchy and the title of Prussian and Bohemian Count (Reichsgraf) in the second half of the 18th century, which was also the golden age of this family. There are only a few members of this family still living.

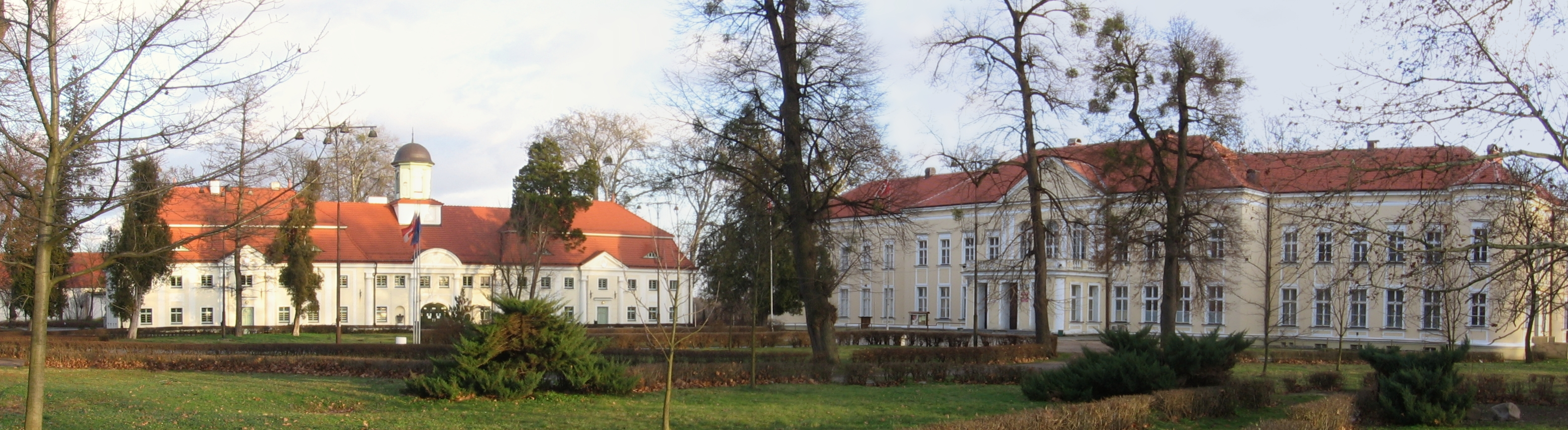
The Dyhrn palace in Brzeg Dolny (German: Dyhernfurth), located in Silesia, Poland

== Notable members ==
- Georg Abraham, Baron of Dyhrn (1620–1671), German chancellor
- George, Baron of Dyhrn (1848–1878), poet
- Konrad Adolph, Count of Dyhrn (1803–1869), politician, author
- Wilhelm Carl, Count of Dyhrn (1749–1813), diplomat
- Johaness of Dyhrn (1400–1460), bishop of Lebus, archdeacon of Lusatia
- Georg Carl, Baron of Dyhrn (1710–1759), the legendary general in Saxony and France
- Ernest, Count of Dyhrn (1769–1842), Prussian chancellor
- Alexandra, Countess of Dyhrn (1873–1945), historian, writer
- Emilie, Countess of Dyhrn (1811–1875), the wife of Gustav Freytag
- Antoinette Louise, Baroness of Dyhrn (1745–1820), entrepreneur and one of the richest women in Prussia
- Sophie Caroline, Countess of Dyhrn (1712–1793), Prussian entrepreneur and landowner
- Amalia, Baroness von Dyhrn (1790–1866), philanthropist and heiress
- Sophia of Dyhrn (1255/1257–1323), the Duchess of Silesia-Liegnitz
- Hedwig Maximiliane, Imperial Countess of Dyhrn (1699–1747), lady-in-waiting and dame of the Order of the Starry Cross

== Literature ==
- Freiherrliche Häuser. Genealogisches Handbuch des Adels (in German). Limburg: C. A. Starke Verlag.
- Gräfliche Häuser. Genealogisches Handbuch des Adels (in German). Limburg: C. A. Starke Verlag.
