= Alexandra von Dyhrn =

German historian

Alexandra Maria Catharina von Dyhrn (8 September 1873 – 9 April 1945) was a German genealogist, author and the first woman in the province of Silesia to earn a doctorate.

== Family ==
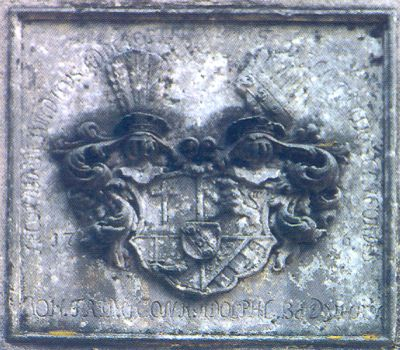
The coat of arms of Alexandra von Dyhrn's family

Alexandra Maria Catharina von Dyhrn was born in 1873 at her family's estate of Reesewitz in the district of Oels, now Oleśnica, in the province of Silesia and was by birth a countess of Dyhrn and a baroness of Schoenau. Her Lutheran family was one of the most prominent noble houses of Prussia, dating back to the 13th century. The estate of Reesewitz, which had been in the possession of the Dyhrn family since the 17th century, was enormous, but was administered from a modest house in the middle of the estate, where the family lived. Alexandra's father, Count Conrad Johannes von Dyhrn, was a lieutenant colonel and a hereditary member of the Prussian House of Lords. He was a friend and a distant relative of Gustav Freytag, who often visited the family at Reesewitz.

In 1872 Heinrich married Alexandra's mother, a Dutch Baroness, Cornelia Tilanus van der Hoop, who was a member of the famous and very rich Hoop or Hope family, originally from Scotland. The marriage of Alexandra's parents was therefore very beneficial in particular for the Dyhrn family. Alexandra inherited a strong love for history and homeland from her father, and the love for arts from her mother, whose family in Netherlands had an outstanding art collection, including works by Rembrandt, Rubens, Vermeer, Steen and Ruisdael. She had two younger sisters, Countesses Freda and Edith von Dyhrn, who were both born with physical disabilities and never married. Alexandra von Dyhrn was a second cousin of poet Valeska von Bethusy-Huc and a grand-niece of Prussian politician Conrad Adolf von Dyhrn (1803–1869).

== Life ==
After her primary education at home and at several evening schools to get the Abitur Alexandra was determined to study at a university. In 1896 her father unexpectedly died of a heart attack, being only 52 years old. Because of such a shock her mother was in deepest depression and had serious psychological problems. Alexandra had to take care of her, as both her sisters were unable to do that, and postpone her plans for future. Two years later (1898) Alexandra and her mother sold the old family estate Reesewitz to the Prussian industrialist and family friend Count Franz Hubert von Tiele-Winckler from Moschen. Alexandra, together with her sisters and her mother Cornelia, temporary moved to Berlin to stay at the apartment of her Aunt Princess Josephine of Vasilchikov (née Countess Dyhrn), who was a widow.

In 1899 Cornelia Countess Dyhrn bought a smaller estate in Badewitz (district Leobschütz, now Głubczyce, Poland) in Upper Silesia at the Silesian border with Czech Republic, where she and her two younger daughters moved to, Alexandra on the other side bought a pleasant apartment in Breslau and began in 1900 with her studies at the Schlesische Friedrich-Wilhelms-Universität in Breslau (now Wrocław, Poland). Her professors war Jacob Freudenthal, Jacob Caro and Felix Dahn. After eight years she received her PhD as a historian and was therefore the first woman in Silesia with a doctorate from this subject. At that time she met Dr. Clara Immerwahr-Haber, later a good friend of her, who was the first woman with a doctorate in chemistry in Silesia. She encouraged Alexandra for female emancipating ideas and feminism. Her husband was dr. Fritz Haber, who got the Nobel Prize for Chemistry in 1918. Alexandra joined the German Association for Women's education and University studies and was a strong defender of female rights. In 1906 she also became a member of the Johanitter-Sisterhood, voluntarily working as a nurse in Breslau. Her two sisters joined the sisterhood as well.

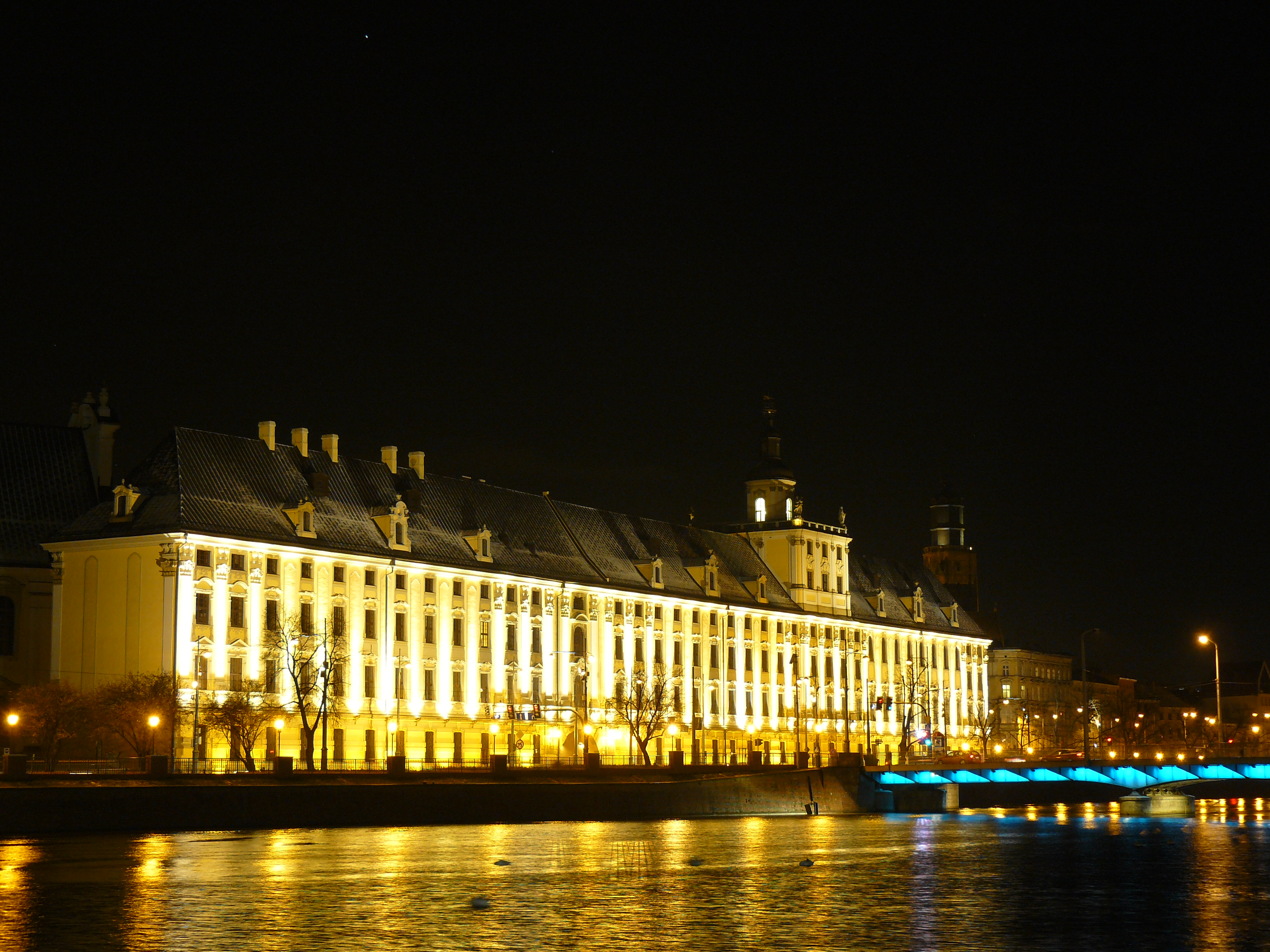
University in Breslau where Alexandra received her doctorate in 1908.

She worked at the University of Breslau as an assistant professor, she was giving historical lectures in several German archives and devoted herself to genealogical researches. In 1924 her mother Cornelia died at her Castle Badewitz. Alexandra, with no desire to live in a castle, sold the property in 1925. Her two sisters, Freda and Edith, moved into Alexandra's apartment in Breslau. During the following years, Alexandra dedicated herself to writing and publishing her historic genealogical works, she had many clients, but the family fortune was slipping through her fingers very fast as she – an unmarried feministic aristocrat – had to take care of her two disabled sisters and wanted to preserve a lifestyle the three of them were used to have. Before World War II, Alexandra was the most prestigious and respected genealogist in Breslau, but the reputation she gained through her competence and work, did not help her a lot with her financial troubles. She and her sisters struggled through the rough time of the War in the "fortress" Breslau and in January 1945 when the civilian population of the city was told to leave, the sisters Dyhrn decided to stay and therefore risked their lives. In April 1945, the city was bombed by the Soviet army and was mainly destroyed. Alexandra and her sisters died on 9 April 1945 when a bomb fell on their apartment at the central Kaiser-Wilhelm-Straße, only a few weeks before the War ended.

== Work ==
As the member of the Association for History of Silesia Alexandra Dyhrn was frequently publishing her researches in the Schlesische Geschichtblätter.

- Beitrage zur Dyhrn’schen Familiengeschichte. Breslau: SG, 1922
- Das Leben und Wir. (Roman) Radolfzell am Bodensee: Dreßler, 1935
- Der schlesische Adel im Laufe der Zeiten. Breslau: SG, 1940
- Stammtafel des Karl Eduard von Holtei. Breslau: SG, 1935

== Ancestry ==
Ancestry of Alexandra von Dyhrn
Great-great-grandparents	Count; Johann Ernst von Dyhrn (1732–1793) ∞ 1759; Baroness; Juliane Henriette von Dyhrn (1741–1792)	Count; Georg August von Nostitz (1753–1795) ∞ Baroness; Jeanette von Reiswitz	Prince; Karl Joseph II. von Palm (1749–1814) ∞ Countess; Marie Josepha von Toerring-Jettenbach (1746–1802)	Baron; Joseph von Gudenus (1755–1831) ∞ 1785; Countess; Constantia Festetics de Tolna (1761–1815)	Jan Tilanus (1744–1815) ∞ Gijsberta Neomagus (1754–1804)	Jonkheer Cornelis de Vos ∞ Jeanette de Greef	Baron; Willem Gerrit van der Hoop (1729–1791) ∞ Baroness; Anna Theodora van Randwijck (1739–1785)	N van Armand ∞ NN
Great-grandparents	Count Ernst Conrad von Dyhrn (1769–1842) ∞ 1805; Countess Eleonore von Nostitz (1787–1853)		Prince Karl Joseph III. von Palm (1773–1851) ∞ Baroness Caroline von Gudenus (1789–1815)		Jonkheer Johann Lambert Tilanus (1784–1812) ∞ Maria de Vos (1780–1849)		Baron Willem Gerrit van der Hoop (*1770) ∞ Theresia van Armand	
Grandparents	Count Heinrich Hermann von Dyhrn (1807–1852) ∞ 1831; Princess Josephine von Palm (1812–1870)				Jonkheer Cornelis Tilanus (1807–1869) ∞ 1835; Baroness Willemina van der Hoop (1817–1877)			
Parents	Count Konrad Johannes von Dyhrn (* 24. September 1843; † 18. June 1896) ∞ 1872; Baroness Kornelia Tilanus van der Hoop (* 7. August 1840; † 5. April 1924)							
Alexandra von Dyhrn (* 8. September 1873; † 9. April 1945)

== Sources and literature ==
- J. Harasimowicz: Adel in Schlesien I. Oldenbourg Wissenschaftsverlag, München, 2009
- A. Lax: Archiv für Schlesische Kirchengeschichte. 1959
- Genealogisches Handbuch des Adels, GA, 1940
- A. Rüffler: Die Stadtbibliothek Breslau im Spiegel der Erinnerung. Sigmaringen, 1997
