= Gronowice =

Gronowice may refer to the following places in Poland:

- Gronowice, Lower Silesian Voivodeship (south-west Poland)
- Gronowice, Opole Voivodeship (south-west Poland)
