= Dziadowa Kłoda =

- Village
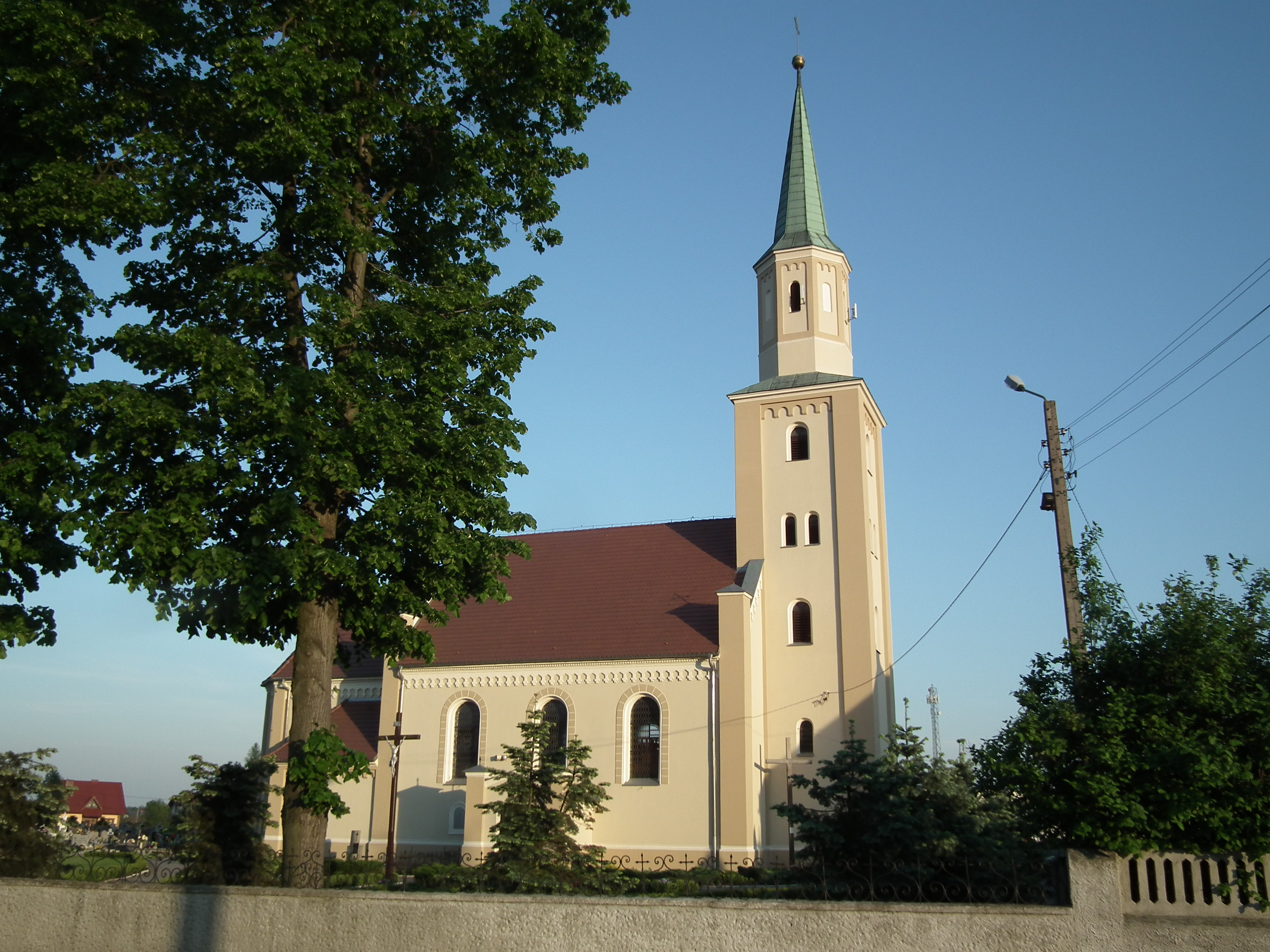

- Location within Poland
- Coordinates: 51°14′N 17°43′E
- Country: Poland
- Voivodeship: Lower Silesian
- County: Oleśnica
- Gmina: Dziadowa Kłoda
- Website: http://www.dziadowakloda.pl/

Dziadowa Kłoda ([d͡ʑaˈdɔva ˈkwɔda]) (German: Kunzendorf bei Groß Wartenberg) is a village in Oleśnica County, Lower Silesian Voivodeship, in south-western Poland. It is the seat of the administrative district (gmina) called Gmina Dziadowa Kłoda.
