= Gołębice =

- Village
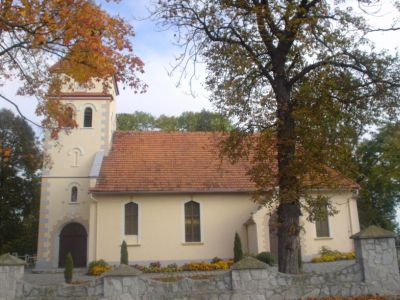
- Village church

- Location within Poland
- Coordinates: 51°11′0″N 17°41′30″E
- Country: Poland
- Voivodeship: Lower Silesian
- County: Oleśnica
- Gmina: Dziadowa Kłoda

Gołębice [ɡɔwɛmˈbit͡sɛ] is a village in the administrative district of Gmina Dziadowa Kłoda, within Oleśnica County, Lower Silesian Voivodeship, in south-western Poland.
