= George Charles Dyhern =

Saxon general born 1710

The Rt. Hon. George Charles, Baron de Dyhern (10 April 1710 – 25 April 1759), was a Saxon general, war minister under the regency of Augustus III. of Saxony, king of Poland and a close friend of Field Marshal Count Frederick Augustus Rutowsky.

== Family ==
Baron George Charles Dyhern (originally Georg Carl von Dyh(e)rn) was born in 1710 in Głogów as a member of the House of Dyhrn, an ancient prominent noble family from Silesia, who had distant relations to many European royals. His father was Baron Melchior Frederick de Dyhern, a wealthy Lord, who owned considerable land in Lubusz Voivodeship, and his mother was the Countess Helen de Nimptsch. His sister Marie Dyhern was the mother of the famous Marshal François Christophe de Kellermann, 1. duke of Valmy.

Dyhern's grandniece, Baroness Caroline de Kottwitz, was the wife of the famous Prussian field marshal Count August Neidhardt von Gneisenau, who was a prominent figure in the German Campaign of 1813 and played an important role in the Battle of Waterloo under Blücher in 1815.

== Life ==
Dyhern was a brilliant student. He studied theology, philosophy and mathematics and he completed his studies with highest distinction. In 1740 he married an Italian aristocrat in Prague, with whom he had two sons. Through his marriage Dyhern became a landowner in Bohemia.

As a lieutenant, Dyhern took part in the battle of the Timok Valley in Hungary (today Serbia) in 1737 under the commandment of Count Frederick Augustus Rutowsky, who later become one of Dyhern's closest friends.

During the War of the Austrian Succession, Dyhern fought as a major in Prague in 1741, as Marshal Maurice de Saxe made his unexpected night attack on the Bohemian capital. In 1745 he was a captain and in 1752 a generalmajor and also a general lieutenant of a Saxon regiment in service of King Louis XV of France, with whom Dyhern was acquainted already since the middle of the 1730s, as he was studying and living in Versailles and Paris. As a general, Dyhern commanded the Saxonian army in Austria, France, Poland and Bohemia. He also became a war minister under the government of the prime minister Count Heinrich von Brühl and he was regularly corresponding with the Saxon Elector Augustus III, Prussian king Frederick the Great, the French king Louis XV. de Bourbon and others.

In 1746 Dyhern wrote a book about wars, named Nachricht oder historische Erzählung des Krieges-Handlungen, which was published in German in Hamburg and the same year translated in French and published as such in Cologne.

In the Battle of Rossbach (1757) Dyhern fought as a commander of Saxon troops along with Prince Charles de Rohan, commander of the French army. France and Austria were defeated by Prussia.

Two years later, on 13 April 1759, the Battle of Bergen in Hesse followed. Dyhern, as Saxon general along with Victor François de Broglie, Duke of Broglie, commander of the French army, fought against the armies of Great Britain, Hesse-Kassel, Brunswick and Hanover. Only a few weeks before the battle, Dyhern was still trying to make an agreement with the Prince de Isenburg, hessian commander, at their meeting in Champs-Élysées in Paris, but unsuccessfully.

In this battle, Dyhern, among many other men (also Prince Isenburg, who died on the same day as the battle took place) was seriously wounded, and brought to a hospital in Frankfurt. France and Saxony were then defeated. In Frankfurt he was tended by Dr. Fresenius, who later wrote a book about Dyhern and his great courageous personality. 12 days after he got the wound, Dyhern died at the age of 49. The Battle of Bergen made his reputation worldwide. The legendary Saxon general was even mentioned by Goethe in his literature -always as “a brave general of liberal spirit”. General Dyhern's great personality and career was also mentioned in works of John Entick (in General History of the Late War), David Hume (in The History of England) and described in other scientific literature and newspapers all over Europe and America through the 18th and 19th century.

General Dyhern was buried in Frankfurt, Hesse. At his funeral great generals as Count Rutowsky and Prince Francis Xavier of Saxony, with whom he was working with in the last years of his life, were in tears over the death of their great friend and colleague.

== Sources ==
- C. A. Frank: The Lutheran Witness. Cleveland, USA, 1899.
- J. P. Fresenius: Baron de Dyhern. Boston, USA, 1835, (translated in English).
- J. Welesley: The works of the Rev. J. Welesley, Volume 3. London, Great Britain, 1810.
