= Lipka, Lower Silesian Voivodeship =

Lipka
- Village
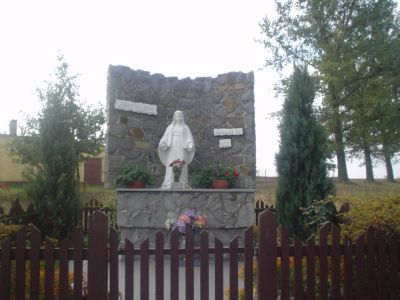

- Location within Poland
- Coordinates: 51°12′N 17°38′E
- Country: Poland
- Voivodeship: Lower Silesian
- County: Oleśnica
- Gmina: Dziadowa Kłoda

Lipka [ˈlipka] is a village in the administrative district of Gmina Dziadowa Kłoda, within Oleśnica County, Lower Silesian Voivodeship, in south-western Poland.

== Climate ==
The climate is moderately continental with warm summers and moderately cold winters. The warmest month of the year is July (March) and the coldest is January (February).
