= Gmina Dziadowa Kłoda =

Gmina Dziadowa Kłoda Dziadowa Kłoda Commune
- Gmina
- Flag Coat of arms
- Interactive map of Gmina Dziadowa Kłoda
- Coordinates (Dziadowa Kłoda): 51°14′N 17°43′E
- Country: Poland
- Voivodeship: Lower Silesian
- County: Oleśnica
- Seat: Dziadowa Kłoda
- Sołectwos: Dalborowice, Dziadów Most, Dziadowa Kłoda, Gołębice, Gronowice, Lipka, Miłowice, Radzowice, Stradomia Dolna

Area
  - Total: 105.14 km^{2} (40.59 sq mi)

Population (2019-06-30)
  - Total: 4,597
  - Density: 43.72/km^{2} (113.2/sq mi)
- Website: http://dziadowakloda.pl/

Gmina Dziadowa Kłoda is a rural gmina (administrative district) in Oleśnica County, Lower Silesian Voivodeship, in south-western Poland. Its seat is the village of Dziadowa Kłoda, which lies approximately 24 kilometres (15 mi) east of Oleśnica, and 49 kilometres (30 mi) east of the regional capital Wrocław. It is part of the Wrocław metropolitan area.

The gmina covers an area of 105.14 square kilometres (40.6 sq mi). As of 2019, its total population was 4,597.

== Neighbouring gminas ==
Gmina Dziadowa Kłoda is bordered by the gminas of Bierutów, Namysłów, Oleśnica, Perzów, Syców and Wilków.

== Villages ==
The gmina contains the villages of Dalborowice, Dziadów Most, Dziadowa Kłoda, Gołębice, Gronowice, Lipka, Miłowice, Radzowice and Stradomia Dolna.
