= Dalborowice =

- Village
- Location within Poland
- Coordinates: 51°11′43″N 17°42′45″E
- Country: Poland
- Voivodeship: Lower Silesian
- County: Oleśnica
- Gmina: Dziadowa Kłoda

Dalborowice [dalbɔrɔˈvit͡sɛ] is a village in the administrative district of Gmina Dziadowa Kłoda, within Oleśnica County, Lower Silesian Voivodeship, in south-western Poland.
