= Brzeg Dolny =

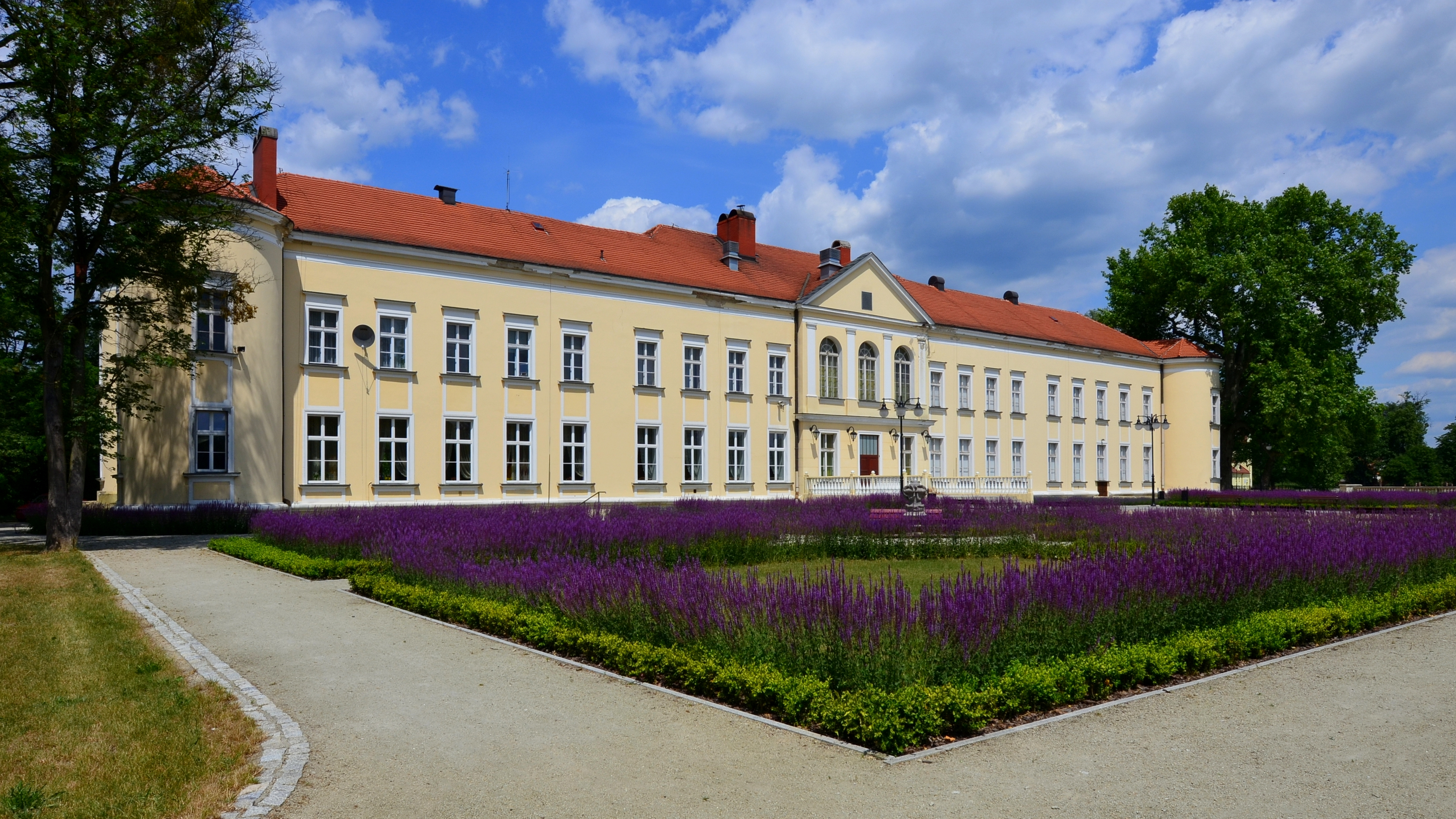
- Palace in Brzeg Dolny

- Flag Coat of arms

- Location within Poland
- Coordinates: 51°16′15″N 16°43′15″E
- Country: Poland
- Voivodeship: Lower Silesian
- County: Wołów
- Gmina: Brzeg Dolny
- First mentioned: 1353
- Town rights: 1663

Government
  - Mayor: Paweł Stefan Pirek

Area
  - Total: 17.20 km^{2} (6.64 sq mi)

Population (31 December 2021)
  - Total: 12,395
  - Density: 720.6/km^{2} (1,866/sq mi)
- Time zone: UTC+1 (CET)
  - Summer (DST): UTC+2 (CEST)
- Postal code: 56-120
- Car plates: DWL
- Website: http://www.brzegdolny.pl

Brzeg Dolny (Polish pronunciation: [ˈbʐɛɡ ˈdɔlnɨ]; German: Dyhernfurth) is a town in Wołów County, Lower Silesian Voivodeship in south-western Poland. It is located 31 km (19 mi) north-west of Wrocław on the Oder River, and is the site of a large chemical plant complex, PCC Rokita SA. As of December 2021, the town has a population of 12,395. It is part of the Wrocław metropolitan area.

== History ==
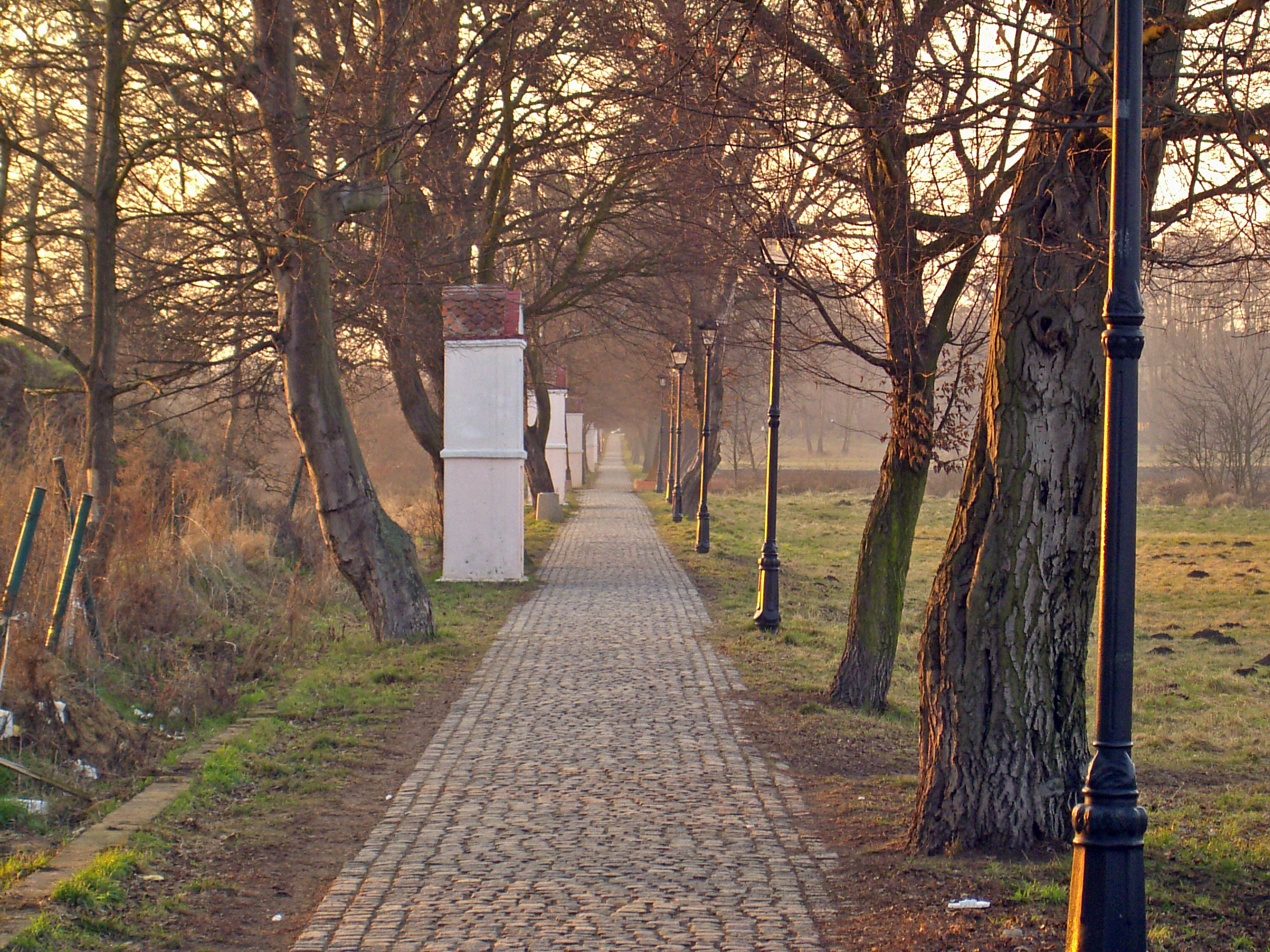
The alley connecting the Old Town with Warzyń

The oldest Slavic settlements in present-day Brzeg Dolny date back to the early Middle Ages. In the 10th century the area became part of the emerging Polish state under its first ruler Mieszko I of Poland. Brzeg Dolny was first mentioned under the Old Polish name Brzege in a 1353 deed as a part of the Duchy of Wrocław, then within the Bohemian (Czech) Crown Lands. The Warzyń district is older, mentioned as a village in a 1261 document of Duke Henry III the White when the region was still part of medieval Piast-ruled Poland. There was a ferry crossing the Oder River in Brzeg Dolny.

In 1660, it was bought by the Austrian chancellor Baron George Abraham von Dyhrn (1620–1671) of the Dyhrn family. In 1663, it was officially renamed from its Polish name to Dyhernfurth, after the Dyhrn family, and was granted town privileges by Emperor Leopold I of Habsburg. The baron made efforts to expand the new town, opening a Catholic school for boys and building a chapel under the patronage of St. Hedwig. The year 1668 saw the construction of a wooden pipe to draw water directly from the river into town.

Jews also settled in Brzeg Dolny in the 17th century. Their arrival was connected to the printing house of Shabbatai Bass; the press personnel consisted of Polish and Czech Jews from Prague, Kraków and Wodzisław. By 1694 the number of the printing house personnel consisted of 48 people in 13 Jewish families. From 1772 onward Bass’ printing house published the Dyhernfurther Privilegierte Zeitung, which was written in the German language but printed using the Hebrew alphabet.

The Dyhrns had built a palace for their residence, which stayed in their possession until the early 1780s, when Count Wilhelm von Dyhrn (1749–1813) sold it to the minister of Silesia Karl Georg von Hoym (1739-1807), who had married Baroness Antoinette Louise von Dyhrn und Schönau (1745–1820). The new owners subsequently modernized the Baroque palace and the adjoining park according to the plans of Carl Gotthard Langhans. Langhans also directed the construction of a large neo-classical pavilion perpendicular to the central structure, which became known as the “Little Palace.” Following these changes, the grand complex remained much the same until 1849, when it passed into the hands of Tony von Lazareff. She had it refashioned to resemble a Renaissance château overlooking the Loire. The river bank garden was also given Renaissance character.

In 1742, after the First Silesian War, the duchy became part of Prussia and remained in Prusso-German possession until 1945.

In 1860, the first sisters of Charity of St. Charles Borromeo came to Dyhernfurth. In close proximity to the Chapel of St. Hedwig, the nuns established a small convent and a hospital, which would eventually expand into the town hospital of present day.

In 1834 the printing house published its last book. After it formally closed in 1840, the Jewish community rapidly diminished as printers went elsewhere for work; by 1885 there were only 35 Jews left in the town. In 1927 the synagogue was transformed into a fire station, in 1936 the last burial was performed at the Jewish cemetery, and in November 1938, the cemetery was demolished.

=== World War II ===
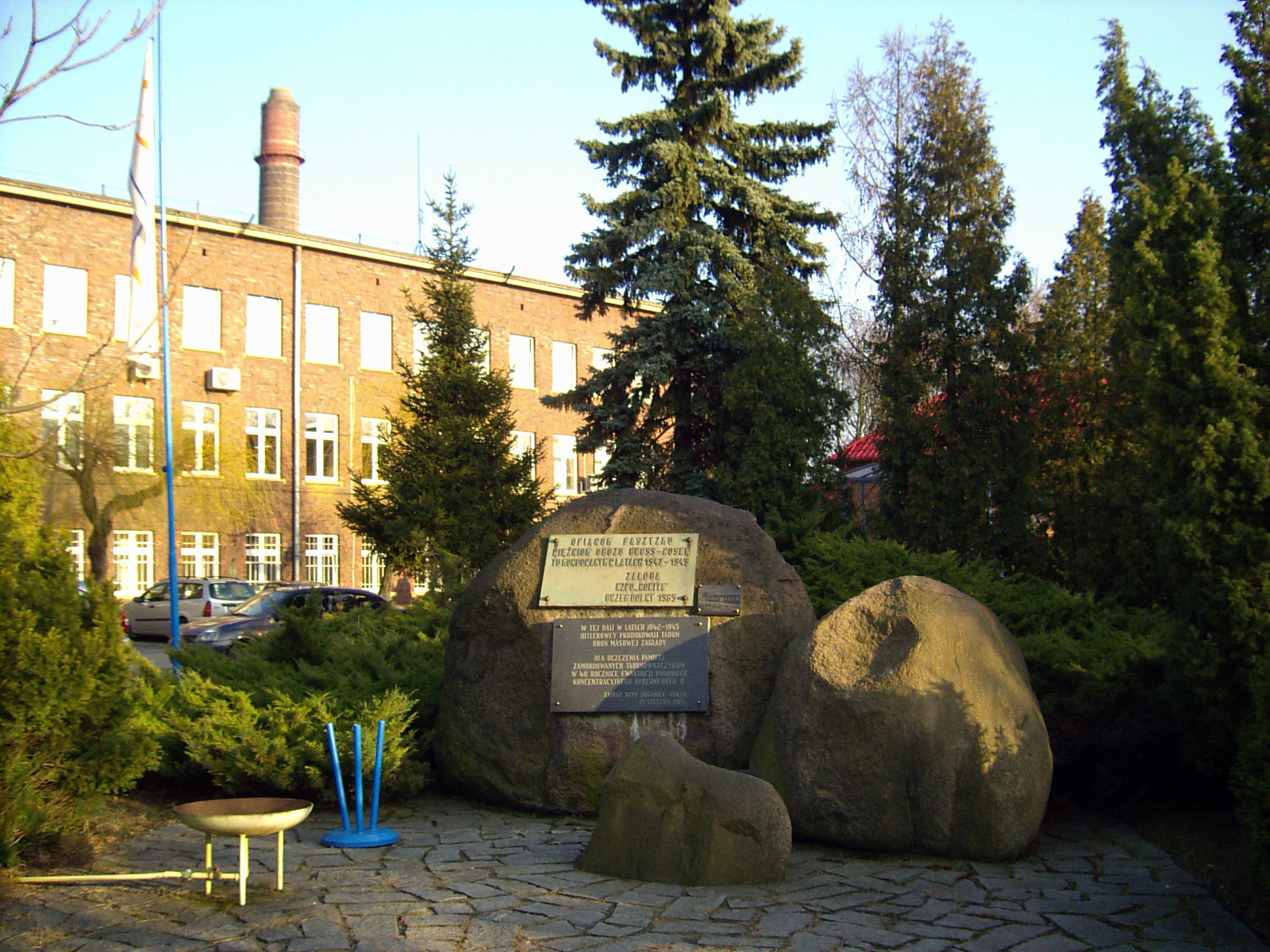
Memorial to the victims of the local subcamps of the Nazi German Gross-Rosen concentration camp

During World War II, as part of the Grün 3 program, a plant for the manufacture of the nerve agent tabun was established in Dyhernfurth, producing the nerve agent under the codename Trilon-83. Run by the Anorgana GmbH, a branch of IG Farben, the plant began production in 1942. The Germans utilized the forced labour of prisoners of Nazi concentration camps to produce the chemical weapons. Two subcamps of the Gross-Rosen concentration camp – Dyhernfurth I and Dyhernfurth II – were established for this purpose. While the Dyhernfurth I inmates were forced to produce the gas and fill bombs and shells with it, the prisoners of the second camp were primarily forced to work on enlarging the plant. The prisoners of the first camp were mostly Poles, whereas the second camp held mostly Jews, Poles and Russians.

The plant initially produced shells and aerial bombs using a 95:5 mix of tabun and chlorobenzene, designated "Variant A" before switching in the latter half of the war to "Variant B," an 80:20 mix of tabun and chlorobenzene designed to make the mixture disperse more easily. Large scale manufacturing of the agent resulted in problems with the product's degradation over time and only around 12,500 tons of material were manufactured before the plant was overrun by the advancing Soviet forces.

There were numerous deaths, in the first camp often due to tabun poisoning, either during forced labor or caused deliberately by the Germans who tested tabun on prisoners, whereas in the second camp due to wretched food, ubiquitous violence and abysmal conditions, which led to frequent diseases. Several prisoners were executed after unsuccessful escape attempts. In January 1945, the prisoners were sent on a death march towards Środa Śląska, with over 200 prisoners shot by the Germans only on the first day of the march.

The Soviets, however, did not capture any tabun at Dyhernfurth. Although they occupied the area of the factory, a German raid was organized by Generalmajor Max Sachsenheimer. A German unit with roughly the strength of a battalion crossed the Oder River early on February 5, 1945, seized the factory, and deployed an anti-tank screen. On that day, the Germans destroyed documentation and evidence of the camp's atrocities and pumped tabun into the Oder River, while the screening force resisted two small-scale Soviet counter-attacks. In the evening of February 5, the German force pulled back behind the Oder River. Subsequently, the Soviet government had the plant dismantled and taken back to Russia.

In January 1945, as the Soviets launched their massive offensive into eastern Germany, Count Thassilo von Saurma-Hoym, a descendant of Karl Georg von Hoym, left the Dyhernfurth palace along with his family and fled westward. In February, the palace was set on fire, probably by Soviet soldiers. When the town was handed over to Poland, its German population was expelled, in accordance to the Potsdam Agreement. It was repopulated by Poles, expelled from former eastern Poland annexed by the Soviet Union, particularly from Stanisławów and Sniatyn.

=== Post-war period ===
After the war the original Polish name Brzeg was restored, and the adjective Dolny was added to distinguish it from the more populous town of Brzeg.

Considerable effort was required to adapt the contaminated and badly damaged factory buildings to production. It was not until 1946 that the plant started producing Sodium hypochlorite. The new plant was named Rokita in June 1947.

The historic palace was rebuilt in the 1950s, albeit with its shape altered. The adjoining pavilion has, however, managed to survive unchanged. Today, the complex functions as a cultural center and the seat of municipal government.

A new bridge over the Oder river was built in 2013.

== Town's layout ==
Architecture of Brzeg Dolny (examples)

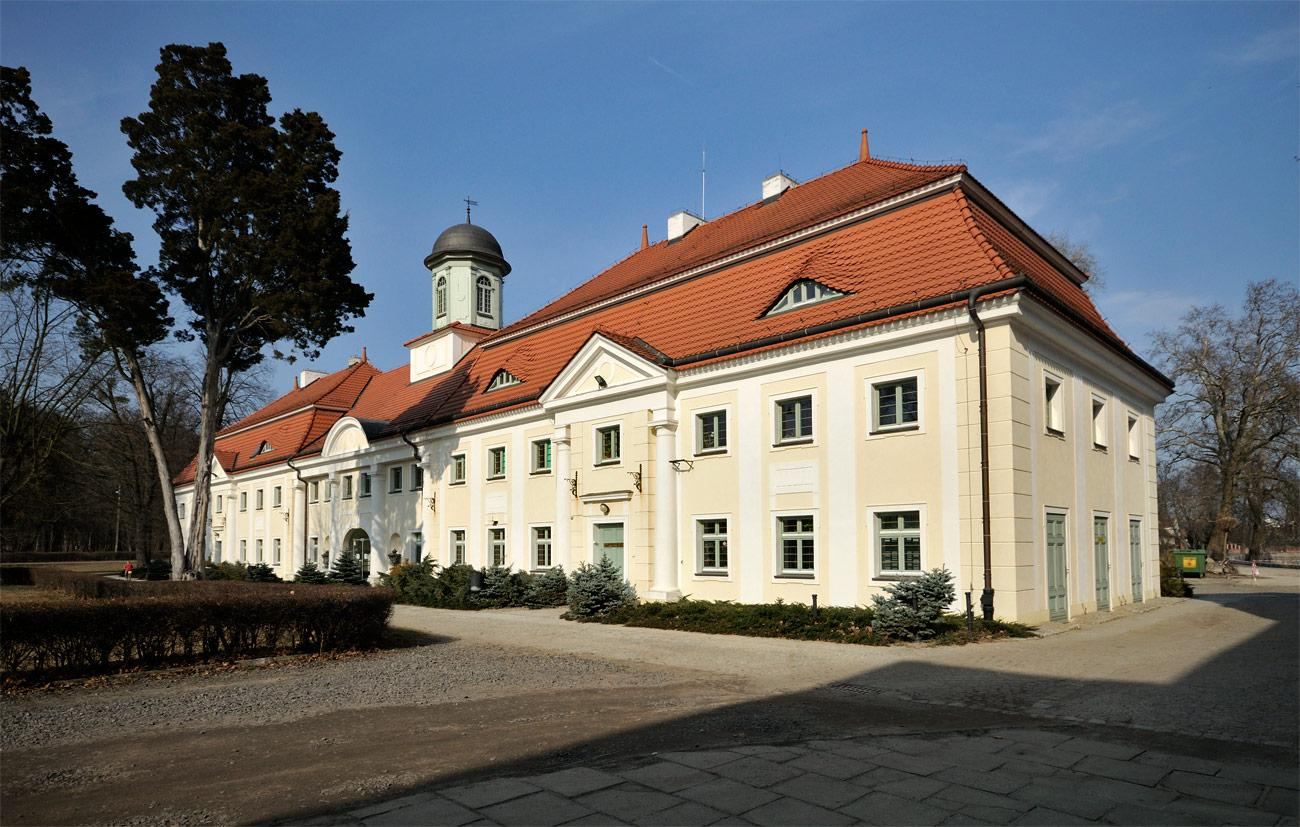
Palace outbuilding

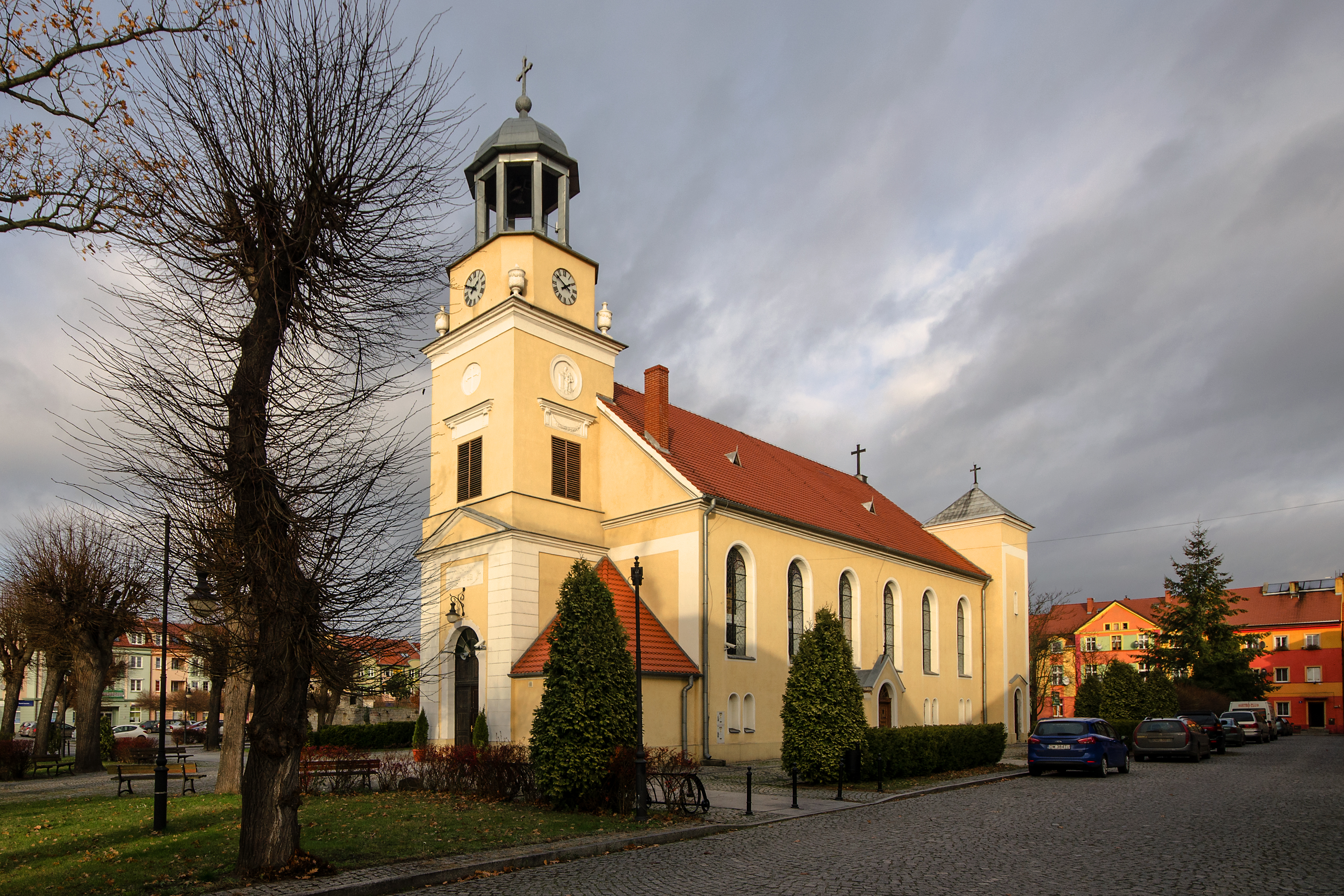
Church of Our Lady of the Scapular

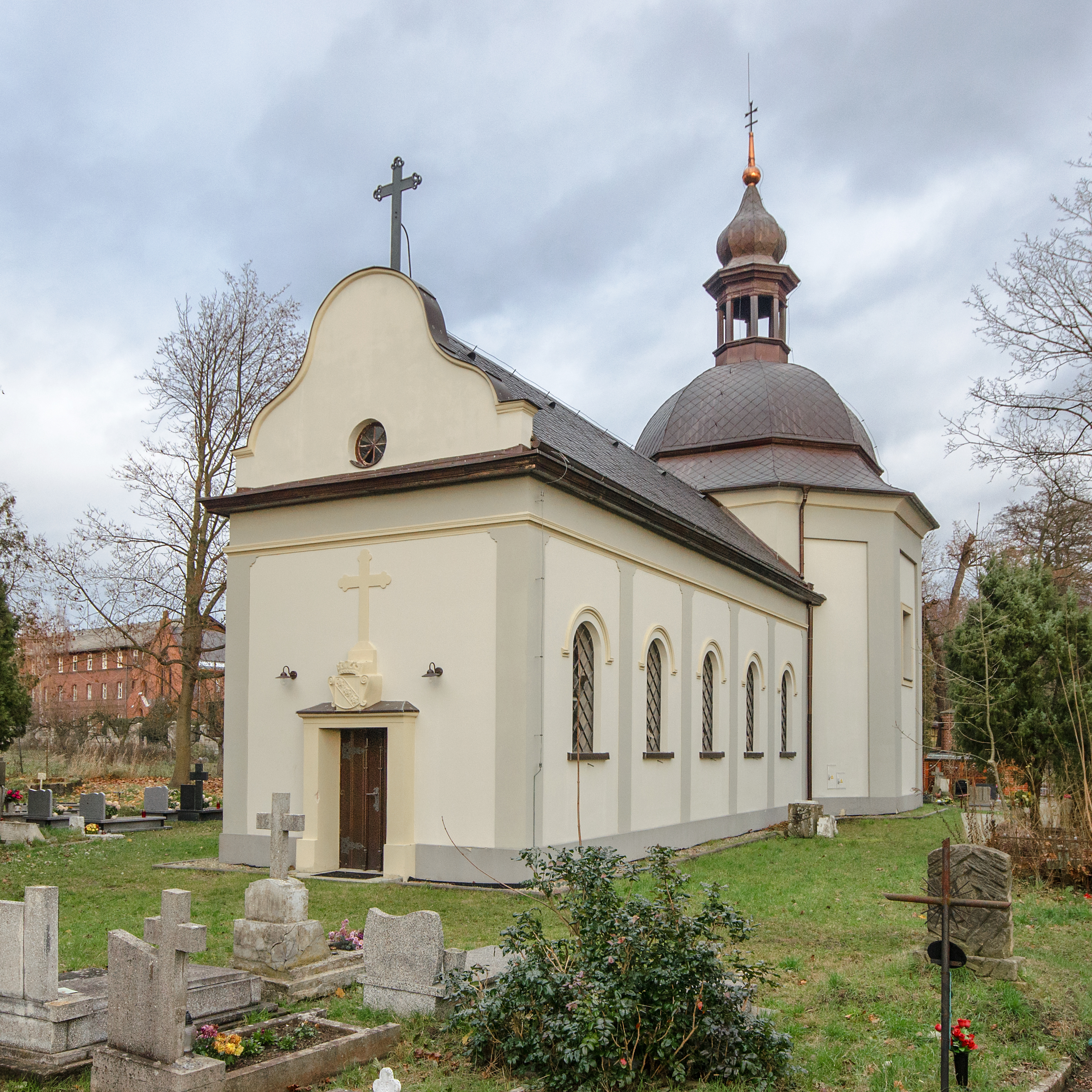
Saint Hedwig chapel

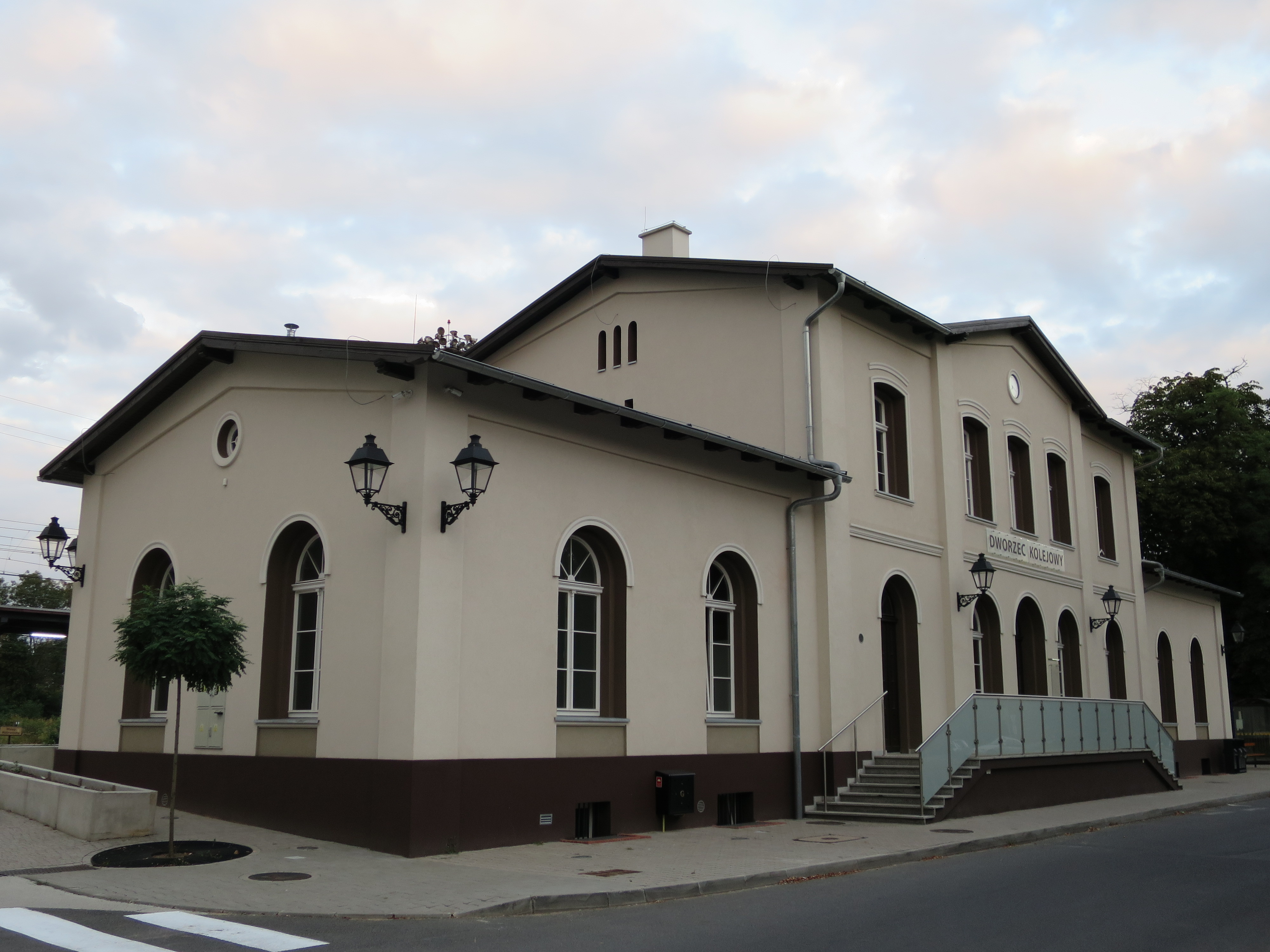
Train station

Brzeg Dolny is divided into three main residential neighbourhoods: Stary Brzeg (the Old Brzeg Dolny) by the bank of the Oder, Osiedle Warzyń to the west, and Osiedle Fabryczne to the north-east. The Rokita Chemical Plant stretches east of the town. In the center of Brzeg Dolny is a large (67 hectare) Park Miejski formerly part of the palace complex.

The palace faces the southern side of the park, to which it connects via a short walkway (Al. Pałacowa) leading directly to the largest of the three ponds found within the park. On the park's west side, at Aleje Jerozolimskie (one of the town's main streets), stands the Chapel of St. Hedwig, just north of which is the Convent of the Sisters of Charity of St. Charles Borromeo. Extending north from the convent (to which it is connected) is the town hospital; north of it, in turn, and still along Aleje Jerozolimskie is a large clinic (Przychodnia Rejonowo-Specjalistyczna). The town has two additional clinics (in Osiedle Warzyń and Osiedle Fabryczne) and a medical center (in Osiedle Warzyń). In Osiedle Warzyń can be found the KHS complex, which features a hotel and a variety of athletic facilities, including swimming pools and tennis courts. Through the town - between Osiedle Warzyń and Osiedle Fabryczne - runs a railway, with a (PKP) train station located on the eastern side of the park toward the south and Stary Brzeg.

== Transport ==
Brzeg Dolny is bypassed by vovoideship road 341 to the west.

Brzeg Dolny has a station on the Zielona Góra-Wrocław railway line.

== Religion ==
Brzeg Dolny has three Roman Catholic parishes: the Parish of Our Lady of the Scapular (Parafia Matki Bożej Szkaplerznej), the Parish of Christ the King (Parafia Chrystusa Króla), and the Parish of Our Lady Queen of Poland (Parafia Matki Bożej Królowej Polski). In addition to two historic churches and chapels, there are two modern parish churches in the town.

== Notable people ==
- Tadeusz Drozda (born 1949), satirist and comic
- Aleksandra Kurzak (born 1977), operatic soprano
- Cezary Żak (born 1961), actor

== Twin towns – sister cities ==
See twin towns of Gmina Brzeg Dolny.
