= Radzowice =

- Village
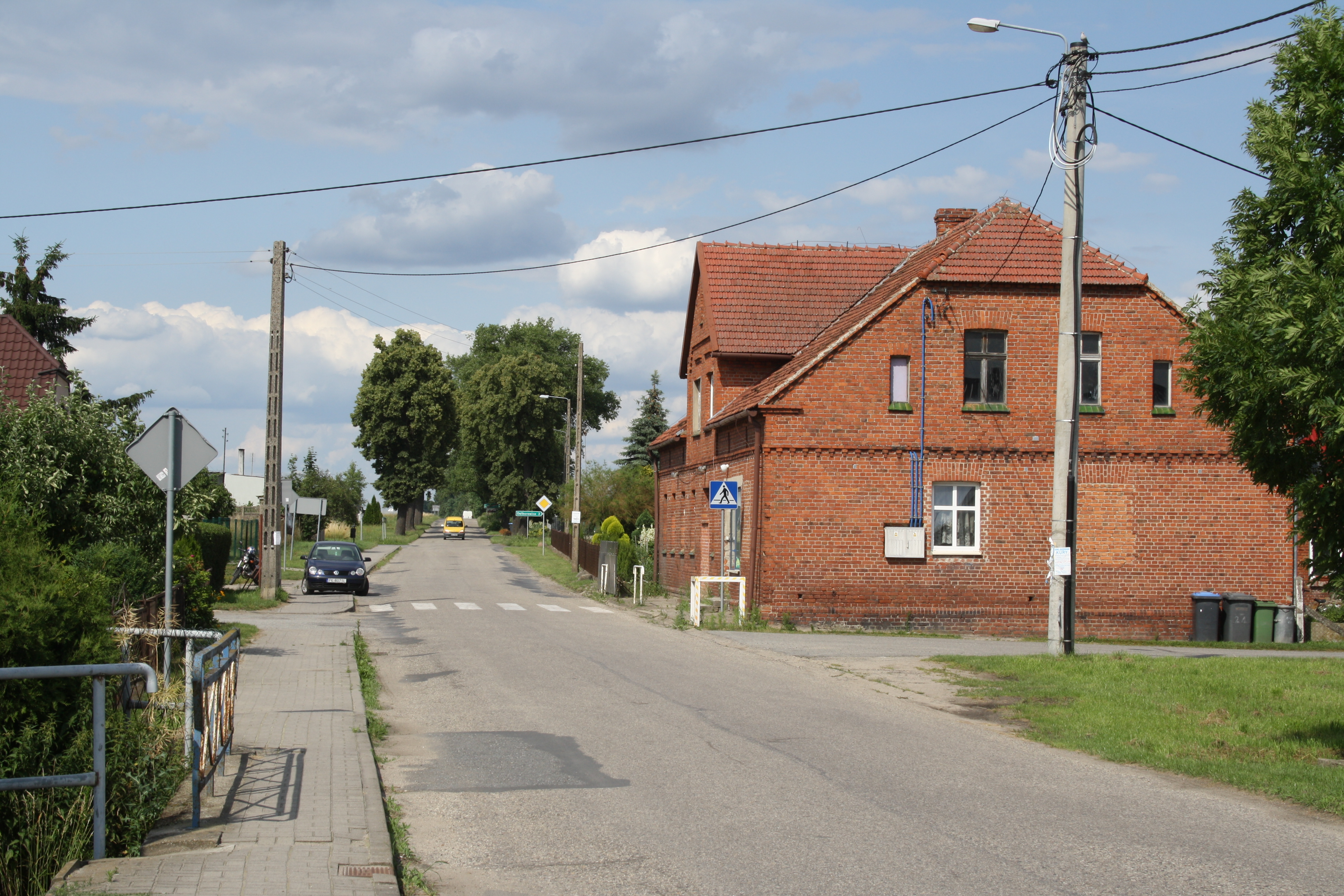

- Location within Poland
- Coordinates: 51°13′N 17°41′E
- Country: Poland
- Voivodeship: Lower Silesian
- County: Oleśnica
- Gmina: Dziadowa Kłoda
- Population: 470
- Website: http://radzowice.republika.pl/

Radzowice [rad͡zɔˈvit͡sɛ] is a village in the administrative district of Gmina Dziadowa Kłoda, within Oleśnica County, Lower Silesian Voivodeship, in south-western Poland.

== History ==
The village was around year 1300 to German right out law. In the 19th century in the village and its environment pre and early historical finds had been made. The church was mentioned for the first time documentary 1524. In the year 1747 the Evangelist church was again established, whereby altar and pulpit from that were taken over old church. One of the two church-bells carried the year 1614. In the church there was also beautiful baptism gel, similarly as in Pangau. The church had become into the Gegenreformation a refuge church for the Evangelist from Syców. Letzer Evangelist minister in Radzowice (Reesewitz) was Fritz Helbig. In Radzowice (Reesewitz) an Evangelist municipality sister (Diakonisse) was active, and there was a municipality kindergarten.

== Photos ==
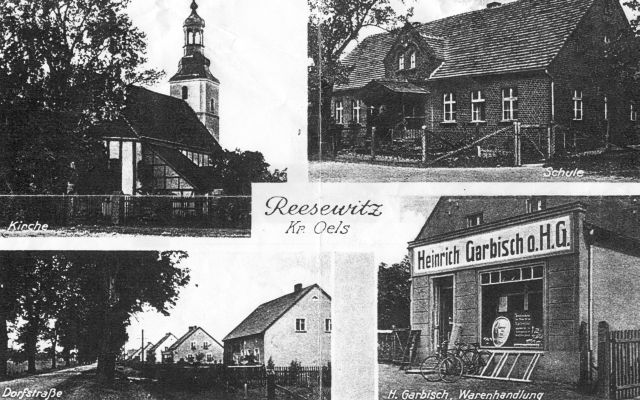
Postcard from 1935

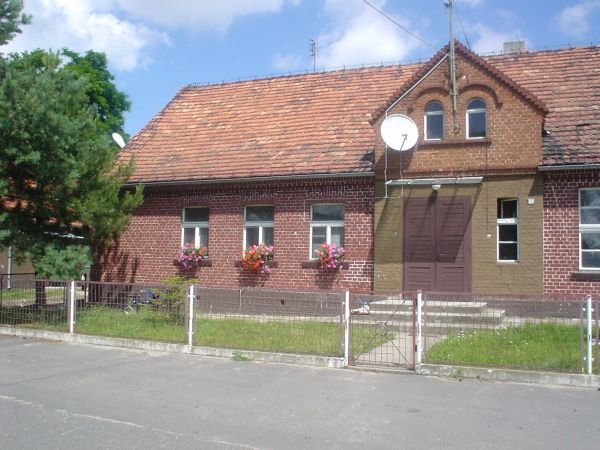
School (1887)

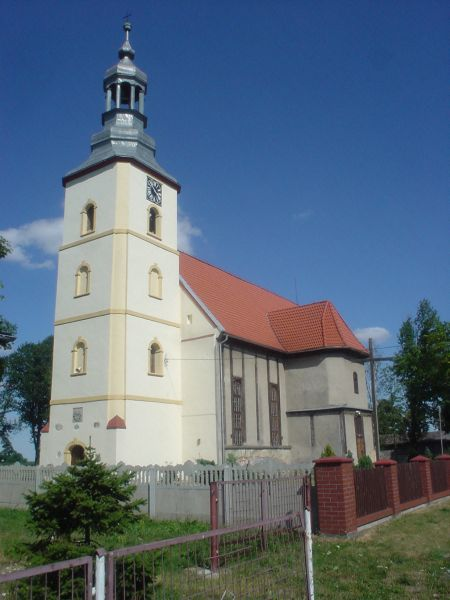
Church (1747)

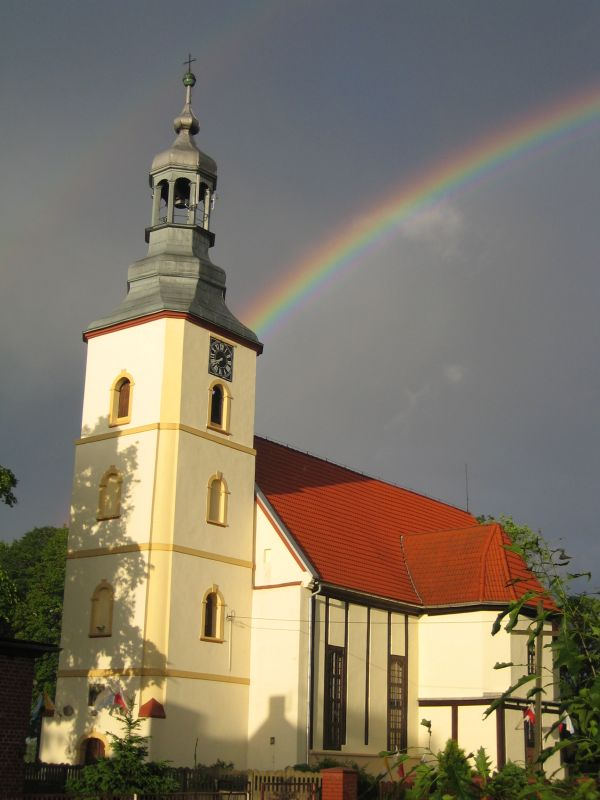
Church (1747)

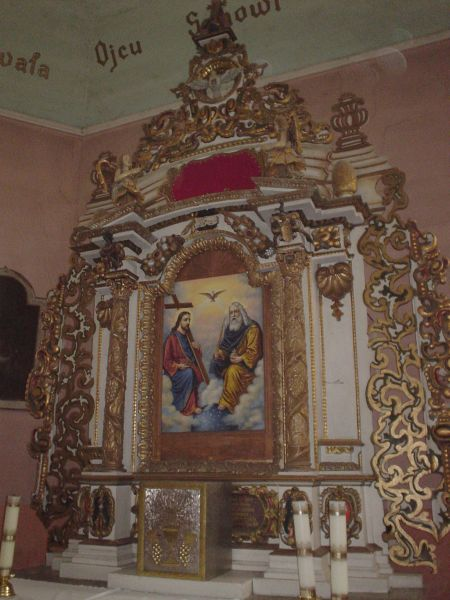
High altar (1673)

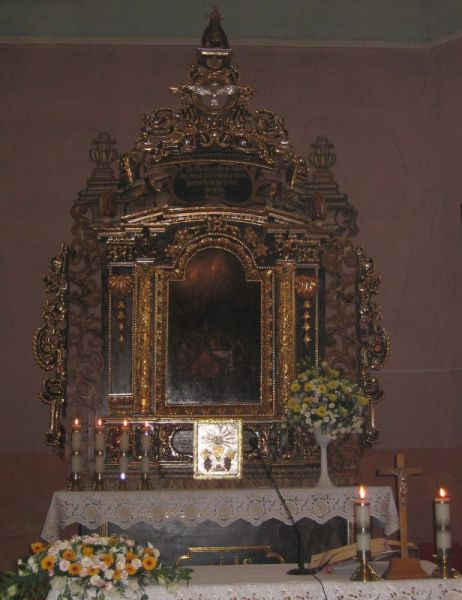
High altar (1673)

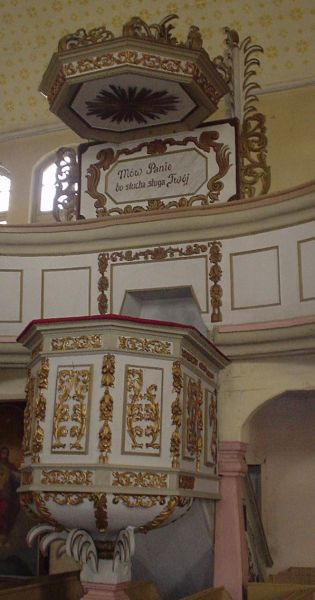
Pulpit (18th century)

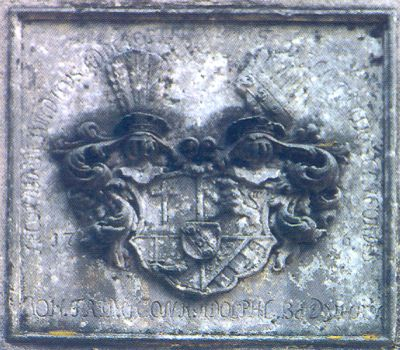
Armorial bearings von Duhrn (1746)

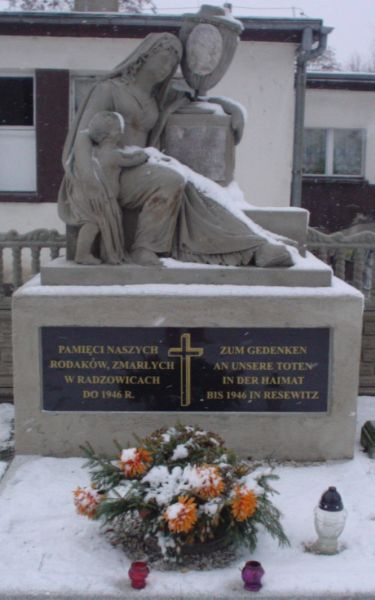
Monument-Charlotta von Duhrn (1804)

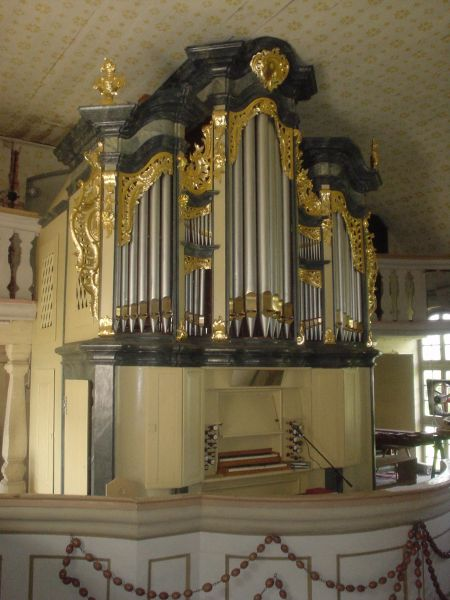
Organ (made in 1871)

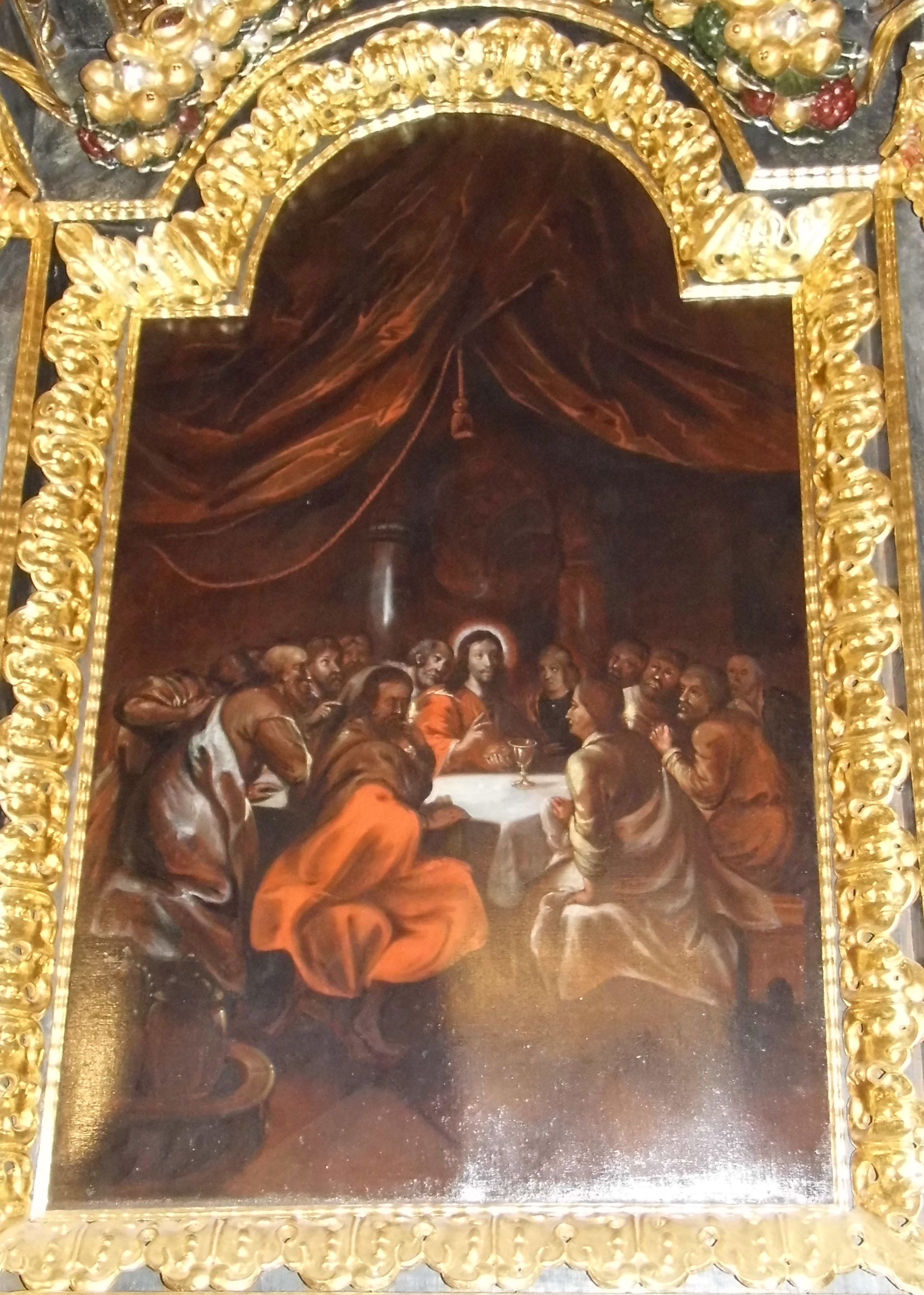
Painting - The Last Supper (17th or 18th century)

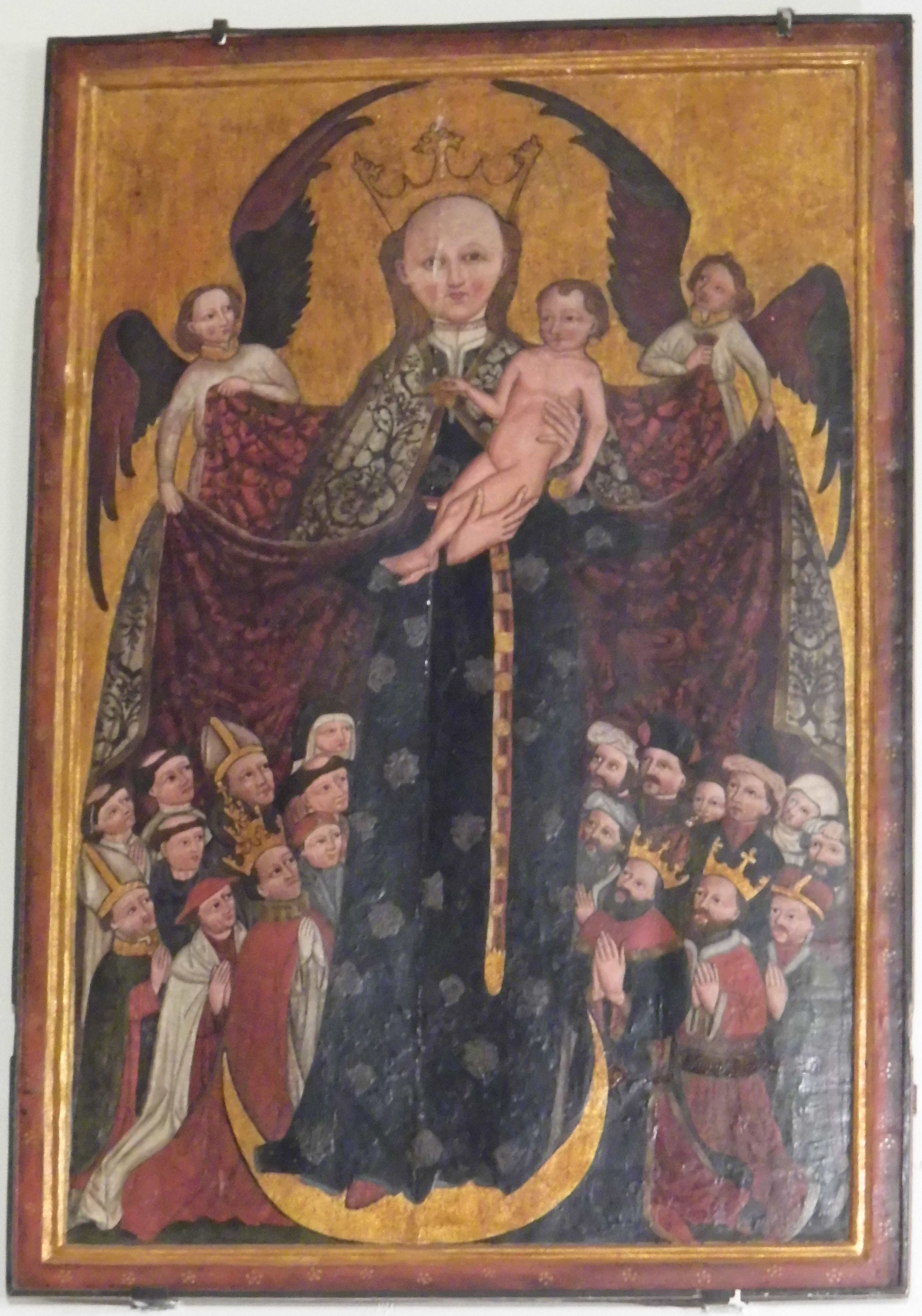
Painting-The Blessed Virgin (1545)

== Notable people ==
- Count Conrad Adolf von Dyhrn (1803–1869), prussian politician, philosopher and writer
- Countess Alexandra von Dyhrn (1873–1945), prussian historian, the niece of Conrad Adolf
