= Amalia von Dyhrn =

Baroness Amalia
- Baroness von Dyhrn
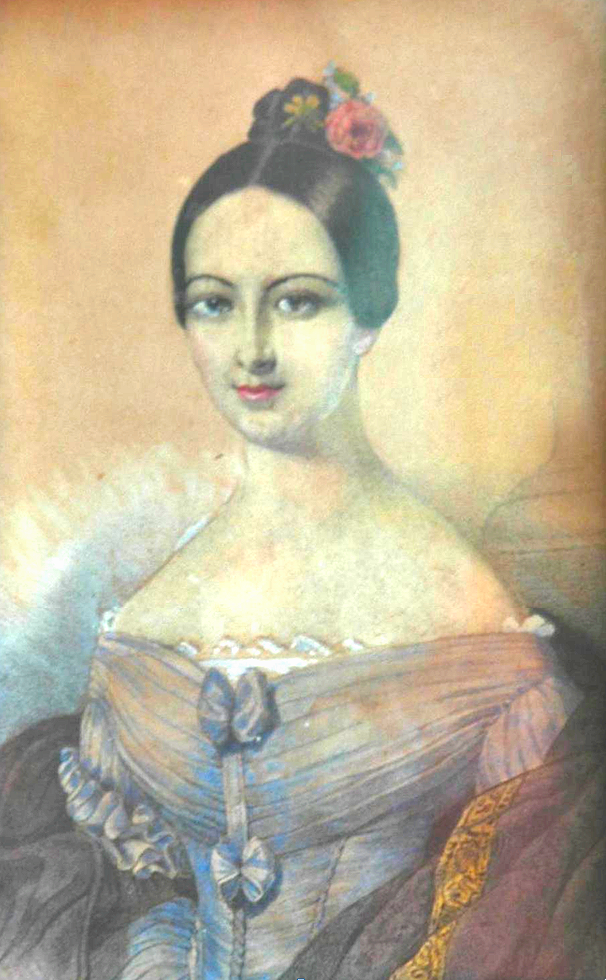
- Born: 30 July 1790; Breslau, Kingdom of Prussia
- Died: 14 June 1866 (aged 75); Herzogswaldau, Kingdom of Prussia
- Spouse: Julius Melchior, Baron von Dyhrn-Czettritz-Neuhaus
- Amalie Friederike Wilhelmine
- House: House of Dyhrn
- Father: Baron Friedrich von Rabenau
- Mother: Baroness Jeanette von Schlichting

Baroness Amalia Frederica Wilhelmina von Dyhrn-Czettritz-Neuhaus née Baroness von Rabenau (30 July 1790 – 14 June 1866) was a German multi-millionaire heiress and a philanthropist.

== Family ==
Baroness Amalia von Dyhrn was born into the Prussian noble family of Rabenau. Her father Baron Friedrich George von Rabenau, a tax officer and a former major in the army, was an impoverished aristocrat, who owned a bankrupted estate in Schwiebus (now Świebodzin, Poland). Her mother Johanna "Jeanette" von Schlichting was an illegitimate daughter of the Prussian general Baron Samuel von Schlichting; because of her opportunistic and promiscuous nature she had a quite bad reputation in the society. Amalia's parents were divorced in 1791. She moved with her mother and her older sister Henrietta to Breslau, where they lived very modestly in a small apartment at a monastery. In 1794 her father Friedrich committed suicide and Amalia never got to know him.

== Early life ==
She was born on 30 July 1790 in Breslau, Kingdom of Prussia (now Wrocław, Poland) on 30 July 1790. As an impecunious divorcée Jeanette von Schlichting, who was a close relative of the Lichnowsky princely family, had to take care of herself and her two daughters. She established a small private tailor school for noble ladies in Breslau and her older daughter Henrietta, who was old enough to work, was sent to the estate of the Counts von Schweinitz-Krain in Niebusch (county of Freystadt in Schlesien), where she worked as a governess of the young Countess Johanna von Schweinitz-Krain, who was a granddaughter of Baroness Helene von Dyhrn (née Countess von Schweinitz). Henrietta stayed unmarried. In 1810 Amalia and her mother attended a high society ball at the family von Berge-Herrndorf's house in Breslau. There she met the young Baron Julius von Dyhrn, with whom she was officially engaged two years later. The Dyhrn family strongly disapproved of this union, because of the bride's trivial background and her low economic status, but Julius was determined to marry the woman he fell in love with. They married in April 1814 in Freystadt. Her mother Jeanette was overjoyed, especially because this marriage meant the end of her family's financial problems.

== Later life ==
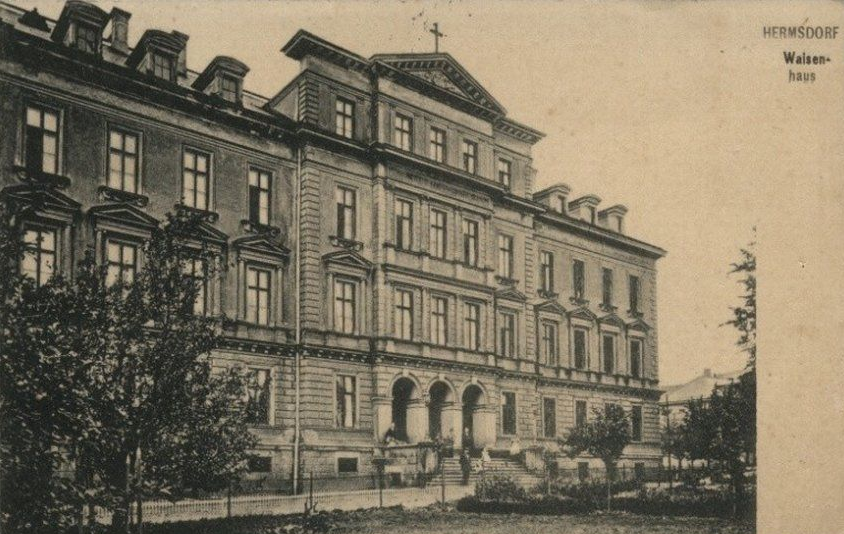
The Dyhrn mansion in Hermsdorf was rebuilt in an orphanage in the 1870s

After the marriage Amalia, now a Baroness von Dyhrn moved to the Dyhrn family's mansion in Herzogswaldau together with her mother and her older sister. Amalia's mother-in-law Baroness Caroline von Dyhrn (née Baroness von Berge), who was actually a stepmother of Julius, was so disappointed with her stepson's choice, that she decided to leave the family residence and move alone to her house in Freystadt. In 1825 Julius took the name von Dyhrn-Czettritz und Neuhaus of his uncle Ernest Carl von Dyhrn-Czettritz-Neuhaus, who had no children, and inherited his fortune and his large properties in Waldenburg. Amalia and Julius moved to their manor house in Neuhaus (county of Waldenburg), leaving Herzogswaldau to Julius' younger brother Heinrich von Dyhrn. The couple had no children, but their marriage was said to be a very happy one. It was only a few years before Julius' death, when the things got bad. The Baron lost his reason and was transmitted to a psychiatric institution. A few years earlier Amalia, born and married into Protestant families, converted in Catholicism and began a close friendship with a catholic priest from Herzogswaldau, named Franz Gyrdt. After her husband Julius died in 1841, the priest moved to the new-build mansion of the Dyhrn family in Hermsdorf. Amalia inherited this mansion and all the properties and buildings, that previously belonged to her husband. She was also very successful in leading the Dyhrn family mining business. The estate, which Amalia von Dyhrn inherited, was enormous; estimated to be 10 million Prussian thalers (nowadays approx. 165 million US dollars). It was because of this princely wealth that people very often referred to her as "Princess" instead of "Baroness".

Although she had no children, Amalia and Julius took care of two of their closest relatives. Since 1822 their nephew Alfred von Dyhrn was living at their mansion in Hermsdorf, and later Amalia also took care of her niece Baroness Anette von Dyhrn.

== Dyhrn family versus Catholic Church ==
The priest Franz Gyrdt became the closest friend of the Baroness and was also the administrator of her finances. He was encouraging her to make several donations for Catholic Church and for catholic institutions in the province of Silesia. Amalia, as a humanitarian person, made numerous donations also for poor and less fortunate people during her life. Franz Gyrdt had a very big influence on the Baroness; it was probably because of him that the Baroness von Dyhrn converted to Catholicism. In the middle of the 1860s she got very ill and in June 1866 she died. Surprisingly, the principal heir of her fortune was her longtime friend and advisor Gyrdt. Her closest relatives –the Dyhrns from Herzogswaldau, were extremely unpleasantly surprised by the content of Amalia's testament. The part of the Dyhrn family fortune, estimated to something more than 12 million thaler (nowadays approx. 200 million US dollars), which at the time was in Amalia's hands, was being inherited by a person who was not even a member of the family and who was actually Catholic. She left more than 9 million thaler (nowadays approx. 149 million US dollars) to Gyrdt, only 1,5 million thaler to her niece Anette (married to Count Heinrich Wilhelm von Dyhrn from the Dolzig estate), half of a million thaler to her nephew Alfred and the rest to charities in Breslau and for rebuilding of her mansion in Hermsdorf into an orphanage. She also left some of her money to her loyal longtime servants – especially appreciated was her personal maid and companion Clara Jäschke.

The Dyhrn family was not prepared to give up the fortune. But after more than 10 years of lawsuits between the family and Gyrdt nothing could be done in favor of the family, because the will was constructed perfectly, allowing neither a refutation nor the right for jurisdiction of the government. The Dyhrn family, who was always convinced, that the priest either forged the testament or forced Amalia to appoint him the main heir of the family fortune, was powerless. Even the Emperor Wilhelm himself could not help them. After Franz Gyrdt received his share of the assets, his lifestyle changed dramatically. He bought new properties, traveled a lot and he also gave up working as a priest. After Gyrdt's death the fortune of this Protestant family was inherited by the Diocese of Breslau (elevated to Archdioces of Breslau in 1930) and was being administrated by the Prince-Bishop of Breslau dr. Heinrich Förster, who already in 1866 also directly inherited a share from Amalia von Dyhrn's estate, and by dr. Adolph Franz. When dr. Franz was leading the German Catholic newspaper Germania, this was also being, among many other Catholic institutions, financially supported by the Protestant Dyhrn family's fortune.

The story was mentioned in several European newspapers, being one of the biggest scandals in the German Catholic Church in the 19th Century.

== Legacy ==
The Dyhrn palace in Hermsdorf was later in fact rebuilt and modernized, and named after the Baroness as Amalia von Dyhrn-Czettritz Waisenhaus in Hermsdorf-Waldenburg.

Several hospitals were established in Lower Silesia under the Baroness von Dyhrn's supervision and financial support.

== Sources ==
- Archiv für schlesische Kirchengeschichte, Bands 8-9. A. Lax
- F. Petermann: Das Priestererbe. Selbstverlag, 1890.
