= Stradomia Dolna =

- Village
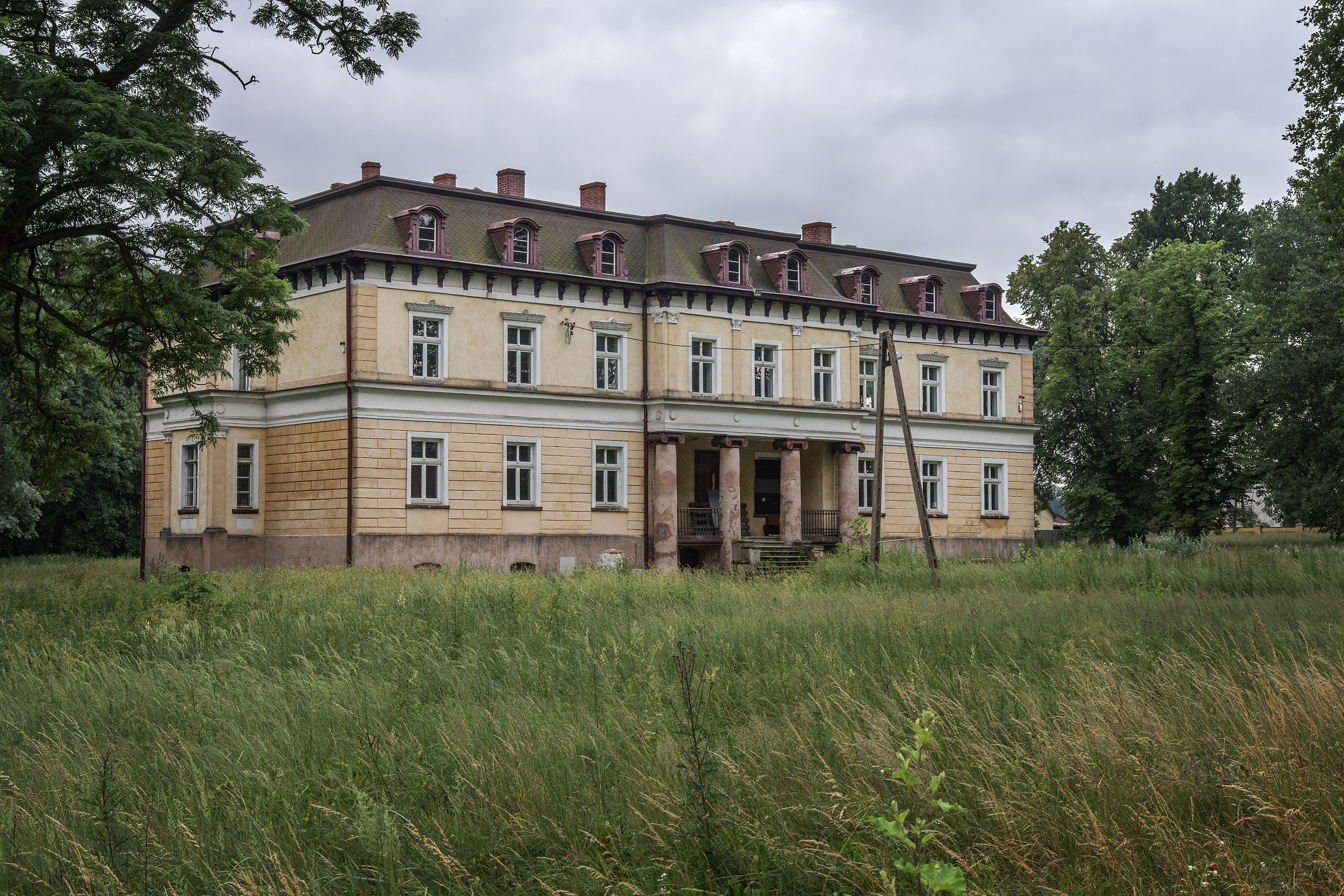

- Location within Poland
- Coordinates: 51°14′55″N 17°39′57″E
- Country: Poland
- Voivodeship: Lower Silesian
- County: Oleśnica
- Gmina: Dziadowa Kłoda

Stradomia Dolna [straˈdɔmja ˈdɔlna] is a village in the administrative district of Gmina Dziadowa Kłoda, within Oleśnica County, Lower Silesian Voivodeship, in south-western Poland. The local population was recorded as 479 individuals in 2021, with an even demographic structure.
