= Miłowice, Lower Silesian Voivodeship =

Miłowice
- Village
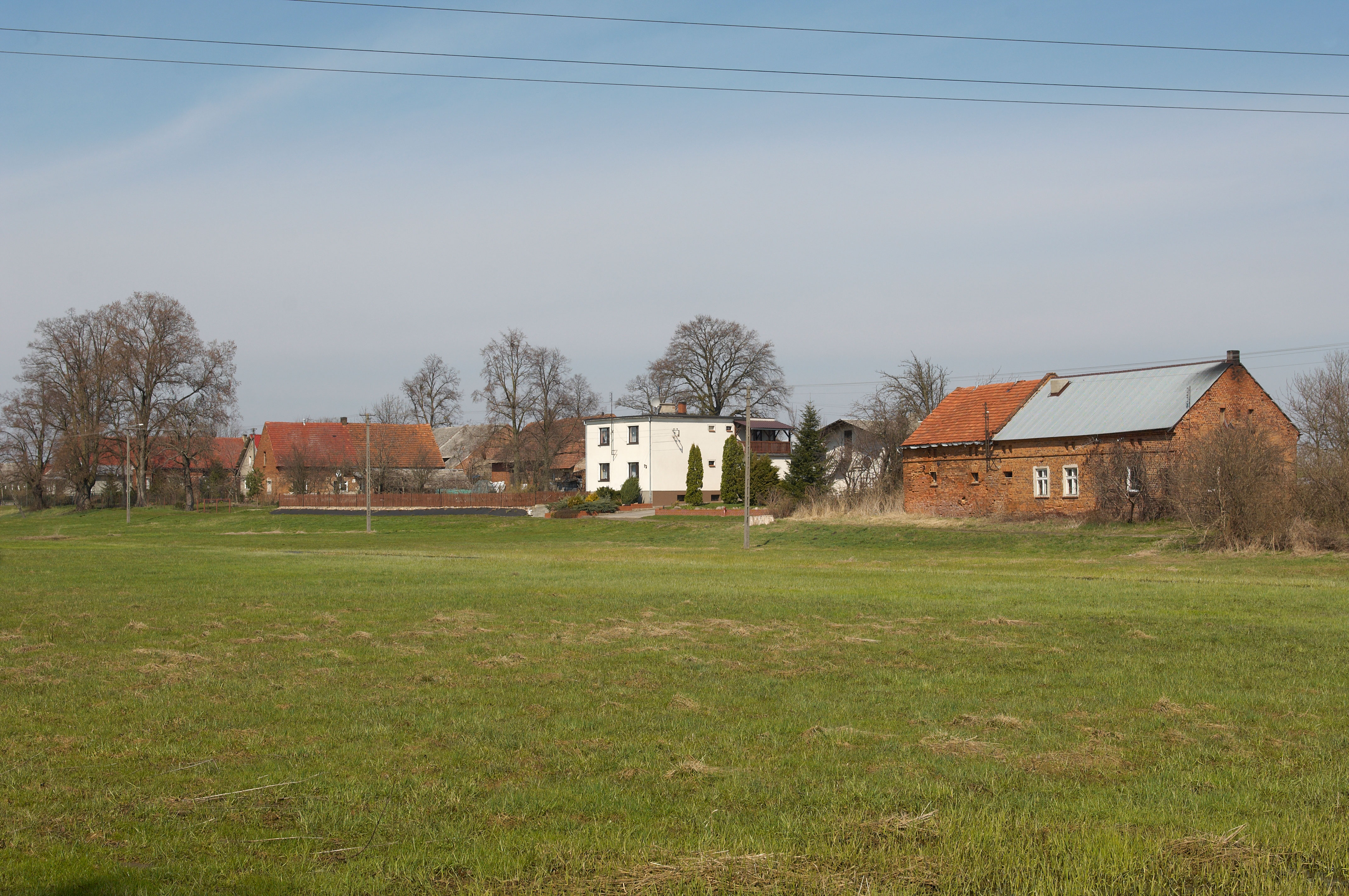

- Location within Poland
- Coordinates: 51°11′N 17°39′E
- Country: Poland
- Voivodeship: Lower Silesian
- County: Oleśnica
- Gmina: Dziadowa Kłoda

Miłowice [miwɔˈvit͡sɛ] is a village in the administrative district of Gmina Dziadowa Kłoda, within Oleśnica County, Lower Silesian Voivodeship, in south-western Poland.
