= Dziadów Most =

- Village
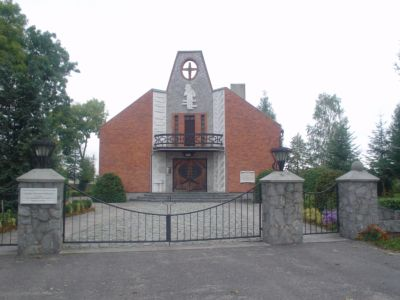
- Catholic church

- Location within Poland
- Coordinates: 51°14′0″N 17°37′0″E
- Country: Poland
- Voivodeship: Lower Silesian
- County: Oleśnica
- Gmina: Dziadowa Kłoda

Dziadów Most [ˈd͡ʑaduf ˈmɔst] is a village in the administrative district of Gmina Dziadowa Kłoda, within Oleśnica County, Lower Silesian Voivodeship, in south-western Poland.
