= George Abraham von Dyhrn =

Austrian politician (1620–1671)

George Abraham von Dyhrn, 1st Baron of Dyhrn (1620–1671), was an Austrian Chancellor in the province of Silesia, politician and a landowner in the Habsburg monarchy.

The city of Dyhrnfurth (nowadays Brzeg Dolny in Poland) was founded by George Abraham and named after him in 1660. This large property (city) stayed in possession of the Dyhrn family till the 19th century, and in hands of their descendants until 1945.

He was made a Baron of the Holy Roman Empire (Reichs-Freiherr) in Vienna in 1655.

== Sources ==
- Historisch-Heraldisches Handbuch zum genealogischen Taschenbuch der gräflichen Häuser (1855, in Gotha, Germany)
