= Gronowice, Lower Silesian Voivodeship =

Gronowice
- Village
- Location within Poland
- Coordinates: 51°12′19″N 17°44′36″E
- Country: Poland
- Voivodeship: Lower Silesian
- County: Oleśnica
- Gmina: Dziadowa Kłoda
- Postal code: 56-504
- Vehicle registration: DOL

Gronowice [ɡrɔnɔˈvit͡sɛ] is a village in the administrative district of Gmina Dziadowa Kłoda, within Oleśnica County, Lower Silesian Voivodeship, in southern Poland.

The village dates back to the Middle Ages. In 1416, it was mentioned as Granowicz.

The village was home to a private zoological collection, which in 1818–1819 became the nucleus of the Zoological Cabinet of the University of Warsaw.
