= Bogdanowice =

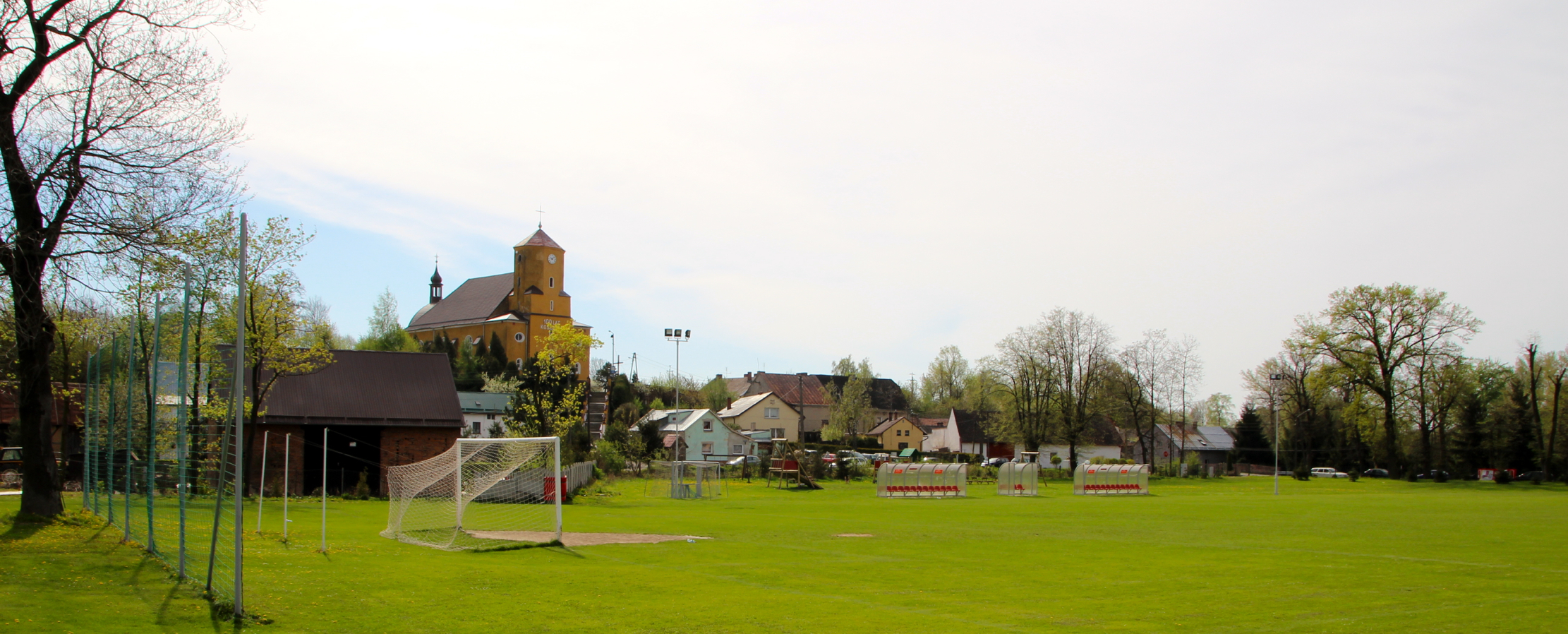

- Location within Poland
- Coordinates: 50°9′53″N 17°49′44″E
- Country: Poland
- Voivodeship: Opole
- County: Głubczyce
- Gmina: Głubczyce

Population (2006)
  - Total: 850
- Time zone: UTC+1 (CET)
  - Summer (DST): UTC+2 (CEST)
- Postal code: 48-100
- Area code: +48 77
- Car plates: OGL
- Website: https://web.archive.org/web/20090619205417/http://www.bogdanowice.cba.pl/

Bogdanowice [bɔɡdanɔˈvit͡sɛ] is a village located in Poland, in Opole Voivodeship, in Głubczyce County (Gmina Głubczyce).

== Location ==
The village is situated about 5 km (3.11 mi) south of the centre of Głubczyce.
