= 1997 Central European flood in Wrocław =

Catastrophic flooding in Wrocław, Poland

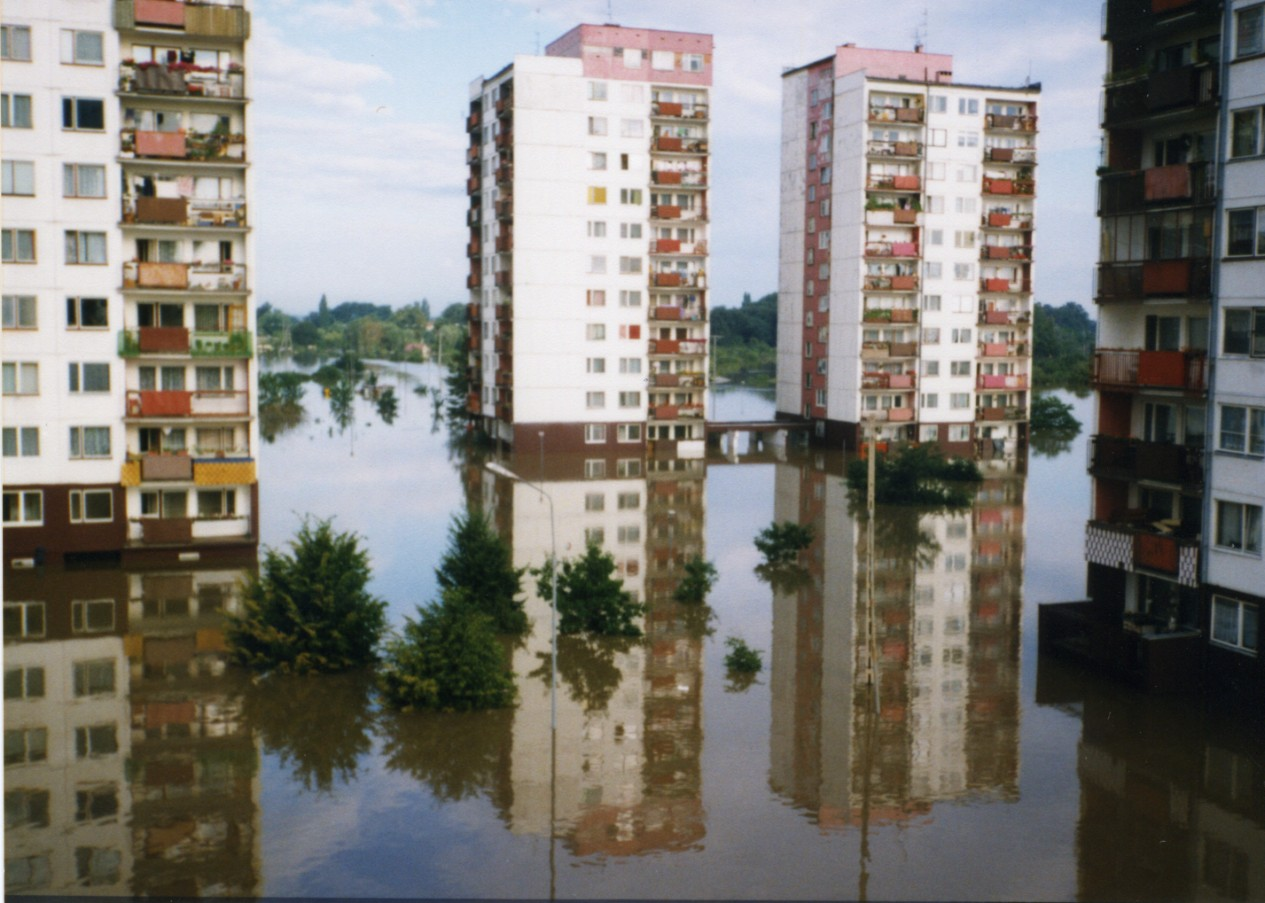
- Flood in Wrocław, 1997
- Date: 12 July 1997 – 6 August 1997
- Location: Wrocław, Poland
- Type: Flood

The 1997 Central European flood in Wrocław, often referred to as the "Flood of the Millennium", devastated large parts of Wrocław, Poland, in July 1997. The flooding, primarily caused by the overflow of the Oder river and its tributaries, including the Bóbr, Bystrzyca, Kaczawa, Kwisa, Mała Panew, Eastern Neisse, Lusatian Neisse, Olza, Oława, Ślęza, and Widawa, inundated approximately 40% of Wrocław's urban area. The floodwaters entered the city on 12 July 1997 and receded by 6 August. The convergence of two flood waves from the Oder and Widawa, combined with the refusal of residents in the nearby village of Łany to allow controlled flooding of their area, exacerbated the damage in Wrocław.

== Background ==
In July 1997, a massive flood struck southern and western Poland, the Czech Republic, eastern Germany (Lusatia), northwestern Slovakia, and eastern Austria, resulting in 114 deaths across the Czech Republic, Germany, and Poland, and material damages estimated at nearly 4.5 billion US dollars. In Poland alone, 56 people lost their lives, with damages amounting to approximately 3.5 billion dollars.

== Flood protection system ==
Wrocław had experienced significant flooding in the past, notably in 1903 and 1905. In response, the city constructed the Wrocław Water Node, a sophisticated flood defense system completed by 1920, comprising flood channels, 93 km of embankments, 11 weirs, and 10 navigable locks, capable of handling water flows of 2,200–2,400 m³/s. This system proved effective during floods in 1975 and 1985 but was not designed to manage simultaneous flood waves from multiple rivers, such as the 3,600 m³/s flow experienced in 1997.

== Onset of the flood ==
The flood began below the Czech–Polish border on 5 July 1997, with water levels peaking in Racibórz-Miedonia between 2:00 and 4:00 AM, reaching 1,045 cm − 207 cm higher than the previous record set in 1985. The hardest-hit areas in the upper Oder basin included the Wodzisław County, Racibórz County, and Opole County. Just two days before the flood reached Wrocław, a local edition of Gazeta Wyborcza reported that the city was not at risk of flooding, though minor basement flooding was possible. The main flood wave reached Wrocław on 12 July, a Saturday, around noon. Media coverage of the devastation in Racibórz and Opole, combined with the fact that it was a non-working day for most residents, spurred widespread mobilization and self-organization. On 10 July, Wrocław's mayor, Bogdan Zdrojewski, alerted by the situation in Opole, urged residents to stockpile drinking water and instructed major institutions to prepare for potential flooding. Just before reaching Wrocław, the flood waves from the Eastern Neisse and Oder converged, intensifying the crisis.

=== Łany protest ===
On 10 and 11 July, authorities considered breaching embankments in Jeszkowice and Łany to reduce the flood wave's impact on Wrocław. However, strong opposition from residents of Łany, Kamieniec Wrocławski, and surrounding areas prevented controlled flooding. On the night of 11 July, residents, alerted by a local, gathered to protect their village, clashing with sappers preparing explosives. By morning, the deputy voivode canceled the operation, citing a "mistake". A second attempt by the voivode around 6:00 PM also failed to convince residents. The deputy police commander, Jan Albrechciński, refused to use force, despite pressure from then-Minister of Internal Affairs Leszek Miller. A final attempt using helicopters to deploy explosives was unsuccessful due to insufficient charges. On 12 July, Prime Minister Włodzimierz Cimoszewicz visited Wrocław and authorized blank promissory notes to compensate for potential losses in Łany, but residents remained unconvinced.

The situation in Łany became a subject of commentary from politicians, ethicists, hydrologists, and even the Supreme Audit Office. The stance of the residents of Łany was described by a Gazeta Wyborcza journalist:

Łany became a symbol. For some, of the lesser evil − that is, an attempt to save a major city at the cost of flooding several hundred farms and homes in fifteen villages; for others, a symbol of the determination of ordinary people against a heartless, arrogant government ready to use police and military to destroy their life's work in the name of saving Wrocław's historic buildings.

On the same day, President Zdrojewski issued an order to evacuate residents of neighborhoods bordering Wrocław to the north and east. However, most of the residents refused and stayed in their homes.

=== City preparations ===
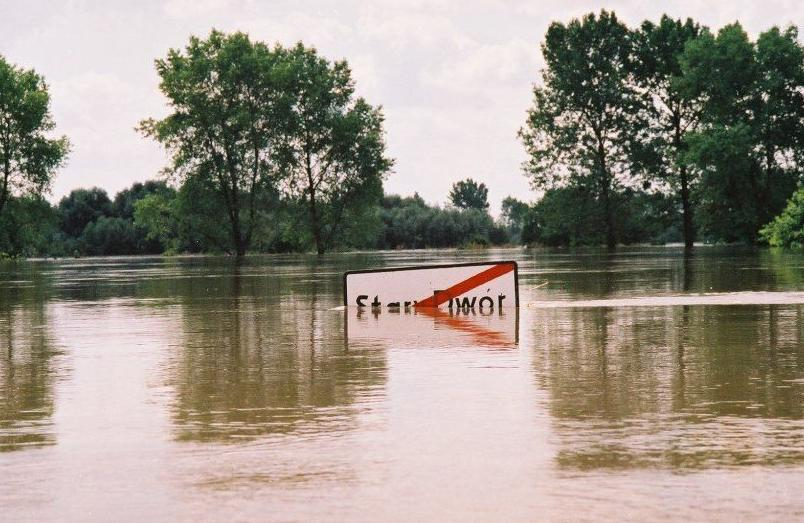
Flooded Stary Dwór near Wrocław

On 9 July at 8:00 AM, President Bogdan Zdrojewski declared a flood alert, and two days later appealed to residents to make necessary preparations: to stock up on drinking water, candles, and gas canisters. Panic broke out in the city, and some residents accused the president of colluding with mineral water bottling companies.

On 11 July, construction of formwork began in the city. The operation was coordinated by the flood prevention committee, and the work was carried out in shifts. According to estimates by the City Office, between 300,000 and 480,000 sandbags were laid in Wrocław. Some of the bags were even delivered by air, including from as far away as Gdańsk. The sand used to fill the bags was not only brought in from sand pits − it was widely accepted to use sand that had been stockpiled for street repairs in various parts of the city (including a significant section of prepared sub-base on General Józef Haller Street that was dug up for this purpose). Most children's sandboxes in Wrocław were also emptied, and soil was taken from lawns. In the city's most flood-threatened areas, sandbags were laid primarily − especially in the early hours of the crisis − by spontaneously gathering volunteers.

On Friday, 11 July, the flood embankment in Siechnice was breached, which ultimately sealed the fate of the flood wave reaching Wrocław. On 12 July around 6:00 AM, residents of the Księże Małe district were alerted by police officers announcing through megaphones the need for immediate evacuation due to a flood wave approaching from the northeast (the Oława river basin). However, the vast majority of residents stayed in their homes and began preparations to repel the flood wave. For this purpose, every available source of sand was used − for example, all nearby sandboxes were completely emptied. Car owners from early morning tried to drive their vehicles away and park them in other parts of the city; some desperately searched for any elevated areas nearby to protect their cars from destruction. Around 1:00 PM, water overflowed onto Opolska Street and entered the district, reaching a height of 180 cm within an hour. Among the streets flooded were Katowicka, Chorzowska, Bytomska, Tarnogórska, and Głubczycka. For the next few days, food and water were delivered by Mi-17 military helicopters, whose crews either dropped supplies onto rooftops or lowered them using ropes.

== Main flood wave ==
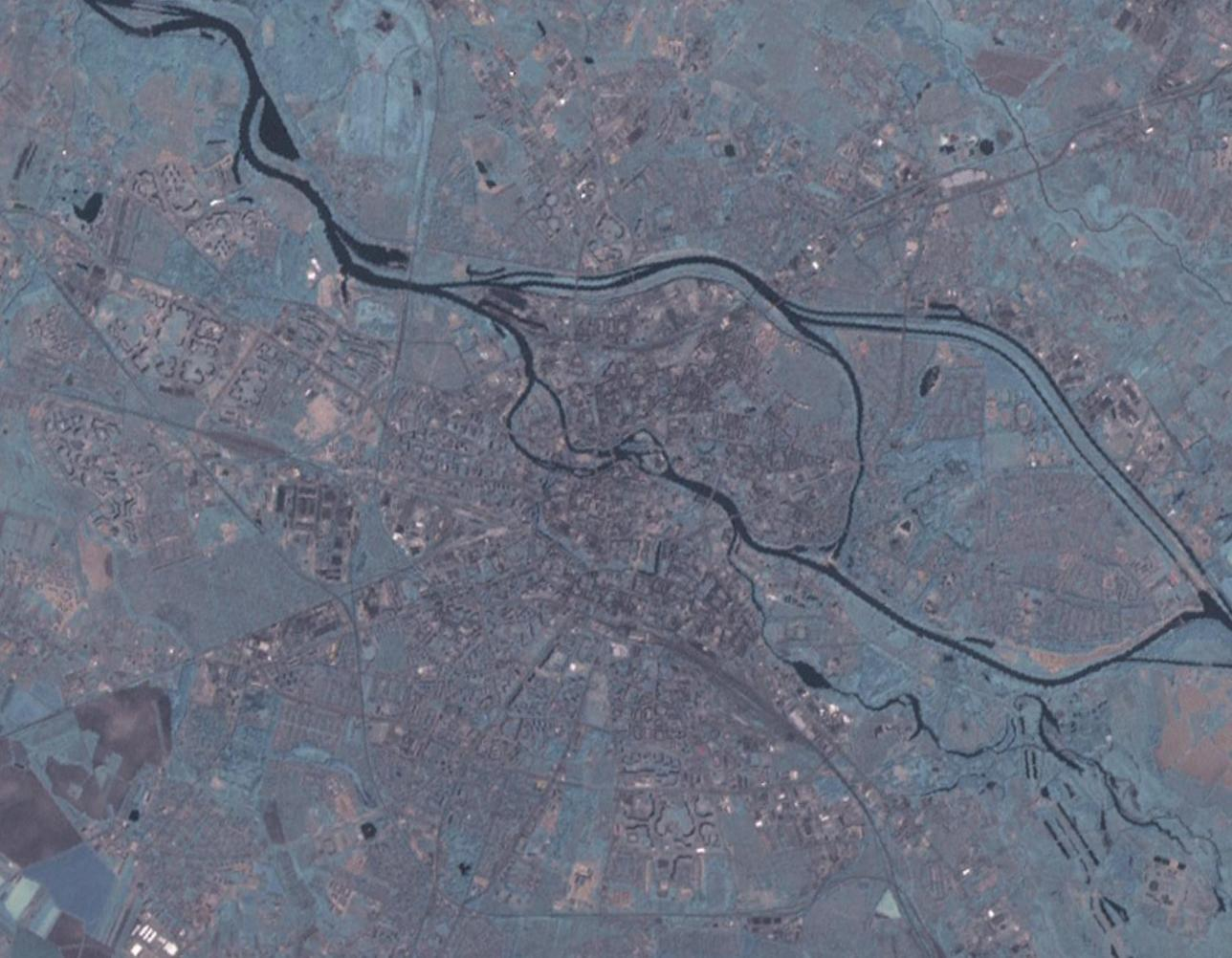
Satellite image of Wrocław showing the Oder's branches

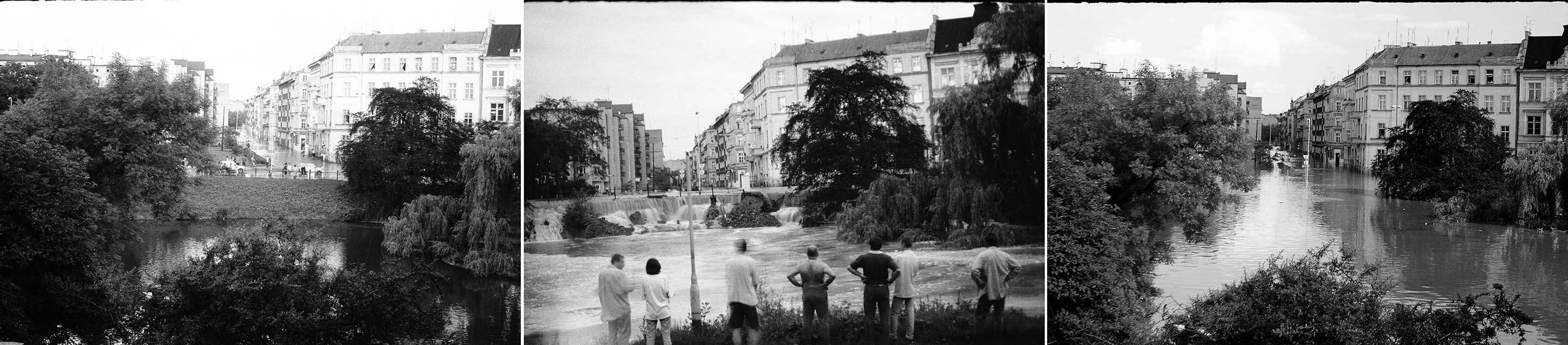
City moat on 12 July (noon and evening) and 13 July, with water from the Oława via Komuny Paryskiej Street

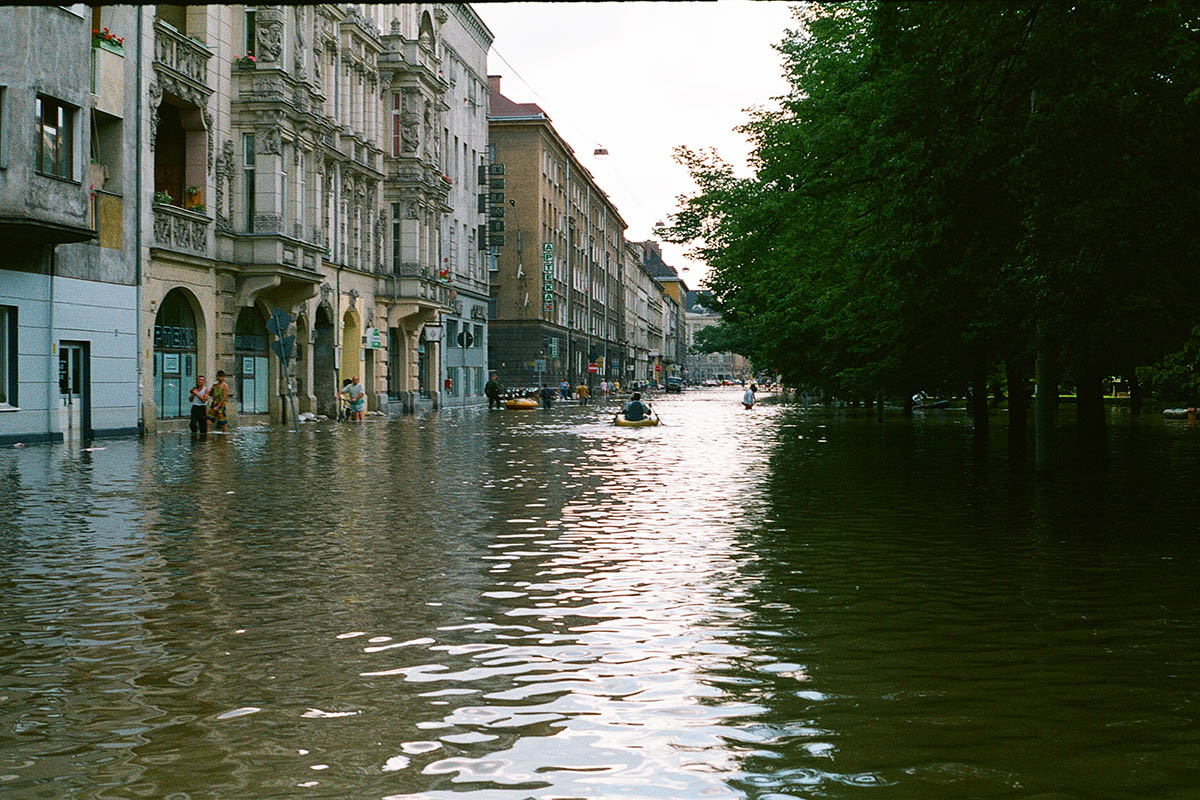
Kościuszko Street on 14 July at noon

On 12 July, water breached embankments at Żabia Grobla and Traugutt Street, flooding the city centre. It spread through Kościuszko and Komuny Paryskiej streets to the city moat, inundating nearby districts. By night, water reached Piłsudski Street and the Main Railway Station to the south and flowed toward Legnicka Street and the Szczepin district to the west, severing the city's northern and southern halves. By the afternoon of 14 July, residents managed to block the water at Żabia Grobla. The Zalesie and Zacisze districts, located between the flood channel and the old Oder bed, were heavily affected, but Sępolno and Biskupin were spared. The Wrocław Zoo was largely saved, with only one zebra lost due to helicopter noise. The recently renovated Japanese Garden was flooded. Low-lying districts like Kowale, Maślice, Księże Małe, Księże Wielkie, Rakowiec, Widawa, and Pracze Odrzańskie were inundated.

The Kozanów district suffered severe damage due to overlapping floodwaves from the Oder and Ślęza rivers. The water level reached as high as the first floor of buildings. Kozanów had been built on floodplains, and due to delays in the decision to breach embankments and flood recreational plots instead, the situation in the area became critical. Similarly, in Rakowiec (known as the "Bermuda Triangle"), water also reached the first floors of buildings. Many pre-war tenement houses there − with wooden ceilings − were so badly damaged that several had to be demolished (some even collapsed on their own, without injuries). In Szczepin, water lingered for an unusually long time due to the terrain. The floodwaters remained the longest in Kozanów and Księże Małe, where even several days after the peak, access to buildings was only possible by pontoon or kayak.

By 16 July, water began receding from the Downtown, and bus services resumed. On 18 July, water levels at the Trestno measurement point dropped by over 1.5 meters, and Popowice began to dry out. A second floodwave was expected, prompting evacuation orders for northwestern districts like Leśnica and Pracze Odrzańskie. Heavy rain exacerbated the situation. By 22 July, areas near Siechnice began to dry, but frustrated residents blocked the road to Wrocław. On 23 July, the Ślęza river overflowed due to backwater, re-flooding Kozanów and Muchobór Mały. The second floodwave hit Wrocław on 25 July at around 6:30 PM, again flooding Siechnice.

== Rescue operations ==
The flood response was led by the then-existing Provincial Flood Committee, District Flood Committee, and the specially established Municipal Flood Committee, created by an order of the mayor. A major operation took place on the night of 12–13 July on Cathedral Island, where efforts focused on protecting the most valuable historic landmarks. Alongside volunteers, the fire brigade played a key role – monitoring and steering away large floating objects like trees, containers, and even a kiosk that could have critically struck bridge supports or other infrastructure. Other vital sites under protection included the Wrocław Główny railway station, the Ossolineum library, and the collections of the National Museum. The rescue work was often carried out at great personal risk. As recalled by Bogdan Zdrojewski:

At one point, a firefighter drove his hook too deeply into a floating tree. In trying to retrieve it, he almost vaulted into the river as if pole-vaulting. The force of the water was immense. They barely managed to hold him back on the bank. A similar case involved a young man defending the zoo who tried to pull some object from the water – the current was strong there, and he probably owes his life to his teammates' quick reflexes.

Approximately 5,000 people participated in rescue operations, with 20,000 assisting throughout the flood.

To prevent the flooding of the city's southern districts, a barrier was constructed along the railway viaduct running from Brochów through the Wrocław Główny railway station and onward toward the Fabryczna district. This redirected the floodwaters through a narrow corridor within the city, allowing them to rejoin the main riverbed near Kozanów. The strategy worked, and the southern districts ultimately remained dry.

However, the rescue operation faced bureaucratic hurdles. The mayor attempted to arrange immediate vaccinations for residents against typhoid fever and tetanus, but approval was denied. Coordination between central institutions was poor, and disputes over jurisdiction arose – hydraulic infrastructure was under state authority, not municipal. Financial decisions were also delayed. One allegation from the Supreme Audit Office criticized Mayor Zdrojewski for not signing attendance sheets during the crisis.

Alongside the rescue work, humanitarian aid was rapidly organized for the flooded city. Convoys of assistance arrived despite the difficult access. The main aid coordination center was set up in the Poltegor Centre building, which also housed the Lower Silesian Television station. City officials, police, and volunteers worked there side by side.

== City life during the flood ==
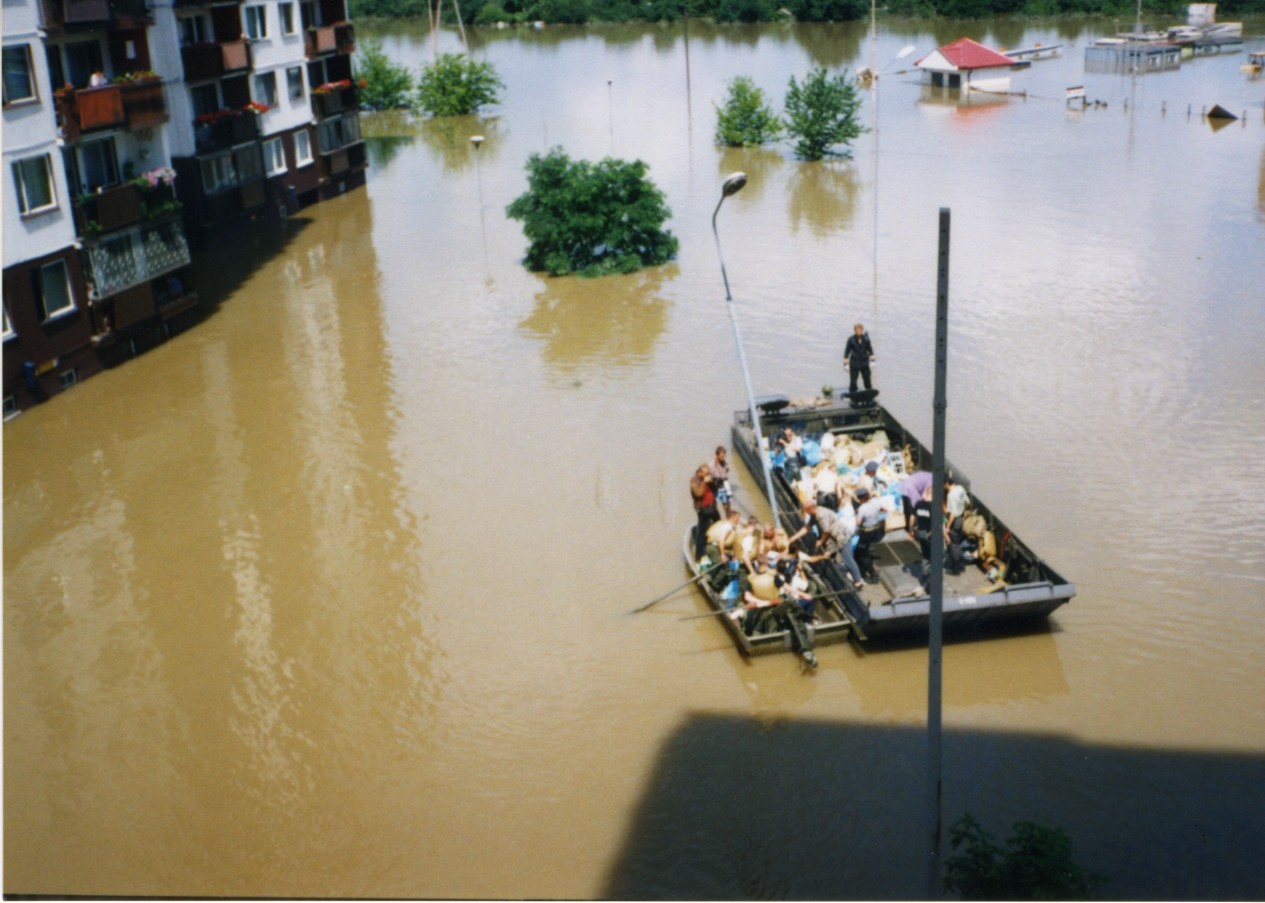
PTS-M amphibious vehicle navigating Wrocław's flooded streets

In the first days of the flood, the Oder river submerged a cemetery and a landfill site. The power outage affected critical infrastructure, including hospitals. The supply of vaccines quickly ran out, and fears of an epidemic began to spread among residents. Water service was cut off throughout the city, some neighborhoods lost electricity, and telephone service and much of the public transport system ceased functioning. Food was delivered to buildings surrounded by floodwater using 30 military Mi-17 helicopters. People relied on a few accessible wells, such as the one at the Silesian Insurgents Square.

Residents gathered on the rooftops of flooded buildings, which became hubs of social life and communication with the outside world. The media – particularly radio and Lower Silesian Television – broadcast instructions for signaling helicopters: white signaled general assistance, red indicated medical emergencies.

There were also instances of exploitation and crime. Police detained individuals profiteering on bottled water, and some demanded as much as 200 PLN for a ride in a rubber boat. Looting of temporarily abandoned homes occurred, and one man was arrested for stockpiling blankets and cots in his apartment, presumably for resale at inflated prices. Those who profited from distributing flood aid faced charges under Article 204 §2 of the Penal Code, which concerned misappropriation of entrusted property and carried a sentence of six months to five years in prison.

During a mass at a church on Wittiga Street, the priest urged attendees to prioritize saving the zoo over praying.

Grocery stores in the city centre reopened on 14 July, with high demand for bread, cigarettes, and batteries. The Wrocław PDT store sold essentials through a raised gate. Police encouraged mobile and boat-based sales to flooded areas. Perishable goods like ice cream were distributed for free due to power outages. Pharmacies operated normally, dispensing medications for chronic conditions without prescriptions.

There was no shortage of humorous situations either – such as young men diving into a liquor store. Another incident was recalled by then-mayor Bogdan Zdrojewski:

I was surprised, for example, by the reaction of a very young man who stopped his kayak when he saw a red traffic light at one of the flooded intersections. He looked left, then right, and continued paddling.

Flood-related jokes circulated, such as one about extending dog chains to survive a three-meter floodwave. Residents responded to the flood differently depending on their age. For the young, it was an adversary to be confronted, and they approached it with almost athletic determination. Older people saw it as a threat to their property, sentimental belongings, or even their lives. Despite these differing perspectives, their actions showed no distinction.

== Media coverage ==
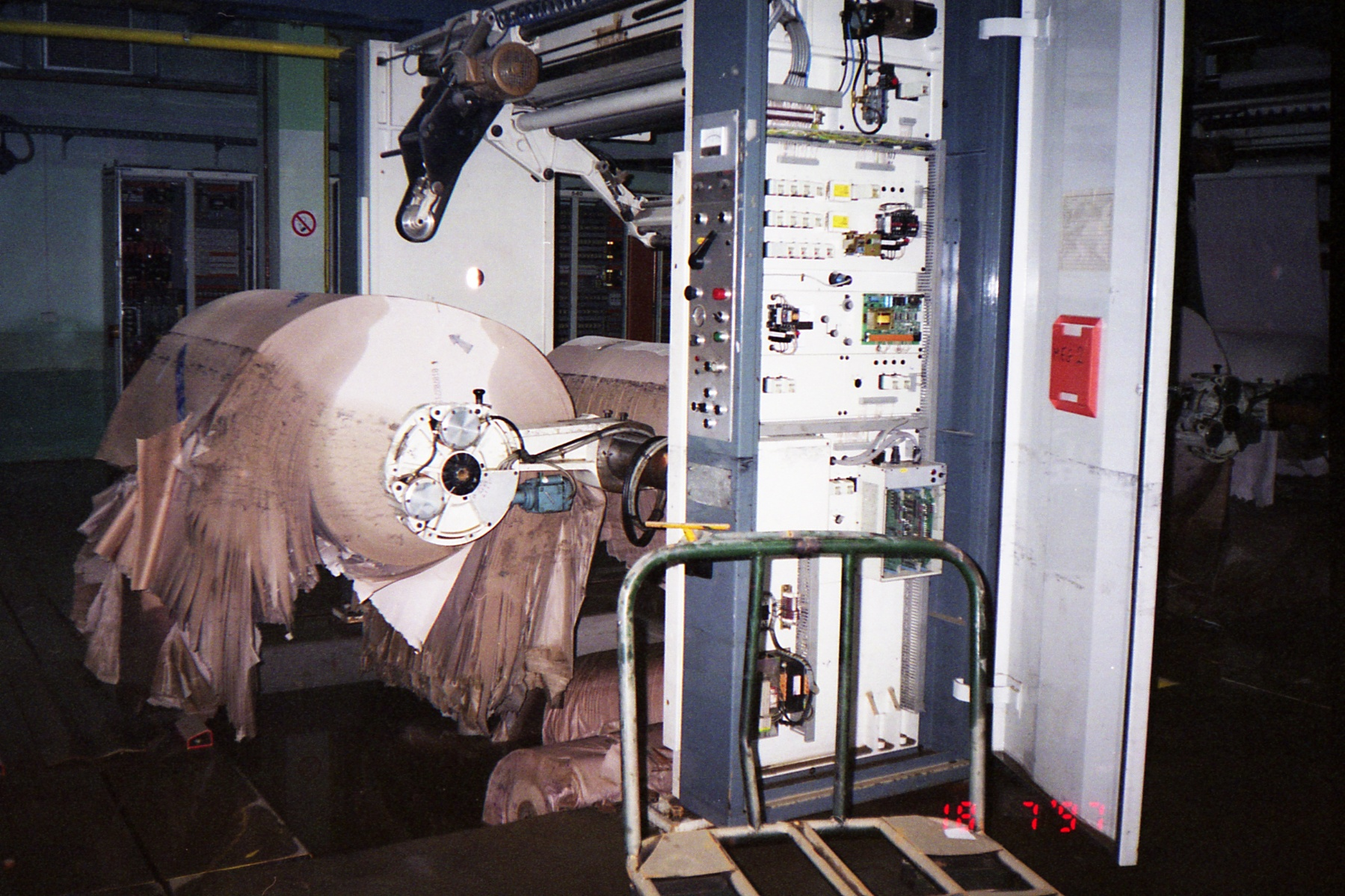
Damaged paper roll in a flooded printing house in Swojczyce

From the very beginning, Lower Silesian Television became actively involved in flood coverage. On 9 July, the station aired a broadcast in which the flood response headquarters declared a state of emergency for the Wrocław Voivodeship. Airtime for flood updates was gradually increased, and starting on 10 July, real-time information was also broadcast overnight. From Saturday 12 July to 16 July, flood news was aired non-stop. The campaign initiated by the station drew in both Mayor Bogdan Zdrojewski and Voivode Janusz Zaleski. The television station also collaborated with Słowo Polskie and local radio stations.

In addition to providing information, the station helped coordinate the efforts of emergency services and volunteers. The newsroom was transformed into a crisis response centre, which organized sandbags, sand, and volunteers, as well as the distribution and coordination of aid for flood victims. Dozens of phone lines – both landline and mobile – were opened to assist in locating missing persons. Regular programming resumed only on 28 July.

Radio Wrocław served as another major information hub, particularly for residents without access to electricity. There was a strong demand for information – humanitarian convoys were frequently met with requests for radio batteries.

The flood also affected the editorial offices of Gazeta Wrocławska and the Lower Silesian edition of Gazeta Wyborcza. However, both newspapers had their printing presses located outside the city – Gazeta Wrocławska, for instance, moved its newsroom to its printing facility in Bielany Wrocławskie.

== Media portrayals ==
The 1997 flood inspired the Netflix series High Water, released on 5 October 2022, depicting the events as the floodwave approached Wrocław. Directed by Jan Holoubek and Bartłomiej Ignaciuk, it captures the crisis' intensity.

== Aftermath ==
The flood inundated or damaged 2,583 residential buildings. Rescue efforts saved historic sites in Downtown, including Cathedral Island, Sand Island, the market square, the Wrocław Główny railway station, and the Ossolineum library. The philharmonic was flooded, but its pianos were saved. The Academy of Music's ground floor, Wrocław Polish Theatre, and the regional court were inundated. Three sports halls, the city port, a water treatment plant, and the newly renovated Wrocław Świebodzki railway station were also affected. The city repaired 44 km of roads and 21 bridges, viaducts, and footbridges, costing 132 million PLN. Additional funding included 66.2 million PLN from the European Bank for Reconstruction and Development, 43 million PLN from the World Bank, and 5.7 million PLN from the Phare program. The Wrocław Water Node was upgraded to handle 3,100 m³/s, with new and reinforced embankments, widened Oder channels, and a new Oder-Widawa channel. Sandbag reserves were increased to 300,000 (20,000 m³). The Kozanów Levee's renovation ensured the district's safety during future high water levels.

== See also ==
- History of Wrocław after 1945

== Bibliography ==
- Skotnicka, Małgorzata (2012). "Powódź tysiąclecia – wrocławska fala wspomnień" [Flood of the Millennium: Wrocław's Wave of Memories] (PDF). Pamięć i Przyszłość (in Polish). 2 (16). ISSN 1899-508X. Archived from the original (PDF) on 2014-07-26.
