= Nadolice =

Nadolice may refer to:

- Nadolice Małe, Klein Nädlitz/Naedlitz, Nädlau, Gmina Czernica, Poland
- Nadolice Wielkie, Groß Nädlitz/Gross Naedlitz, Nädlingen, Gmina Czernica, Poland
