= Krzyków =

Krzyków may refer to the following places in Poland:

- Krzyków, Lower Silesian Voivodeship (south-west Poland)
- Krzyków, Opole Voivodeship (south-west Poland)
