= Gałczyński =

Gałczyński (Polish pronunciation: [ɡawˈt͡ʂɘ̟ɲ.ski]; feminine: Gałczyńska; plural: Gałczyńscy) is a Polish-language surname.

== People ==
- Konstanty Ildefons Gałczyński (1905–1953), Polish poet
- Anna Sobolak (née Gałczyńska; born 1979), Polish politician and businessperson
