= Chodaczków Wielki massacre =

1944 massacre of Poles

- Part of World War II
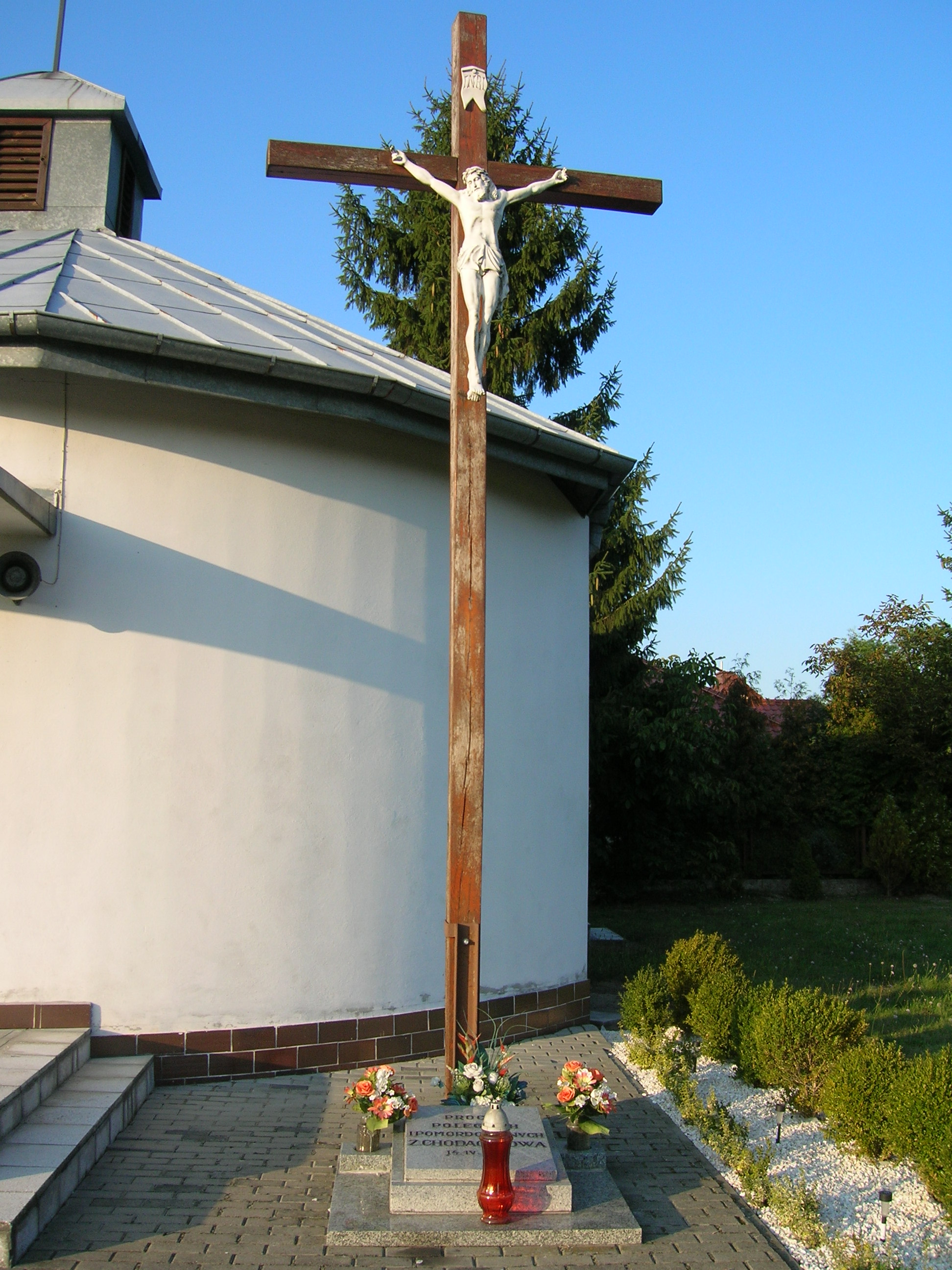
- Monument in Gajków to the victims
- Native name: Zbrodnia w Chodaczkowie Wielkim
- Location: Chodaczków Wielki
- Date: April 16, 1944
- Attack type: arson attack
- Weapons: grenades, firearms
- Deaths: 862
- Victim: Polish villagers
- Perpetrator: 14th Waffen Grenadier Division of the SS (1st Galician)

The Chodaczków Wielki massacre (Polish: Zbrodnia w Chodaczkowie Wielkim) occurred on 16 April 1944 when 862 Poles were killed by the 14th Waffen Grenadier Division of the SS (1st Galician) in the village of Chodaczków Wielki in German occupied Poland (now Velykyi Khodachkiv, Ternopil Oblast, Ukraine).

The massacre started when the perpetrators, a division composed of ethnic Ukrainian volunteers, arrived in the town of 2,800 people in order to turn the settlement into a base to supply reinforcements for the then-ongoing siege of Ternopil. Once inside the town, they began setting the houses of ethnic Poles on fire. Soldiers tossed grenades into burning houses and shot anyone who tried to flee. The bodies of the victims were buried in a mass grave outside the local church. An estimated 862 Poles were killed (including children and the elderly), making it one of the largest massacres of Poles.

== See also ==
- Huta Pieniacka massacre
- Pidkamin massacre
