= Ratowice, Lower Silesian Voivodeship =

Ratowice
- Village
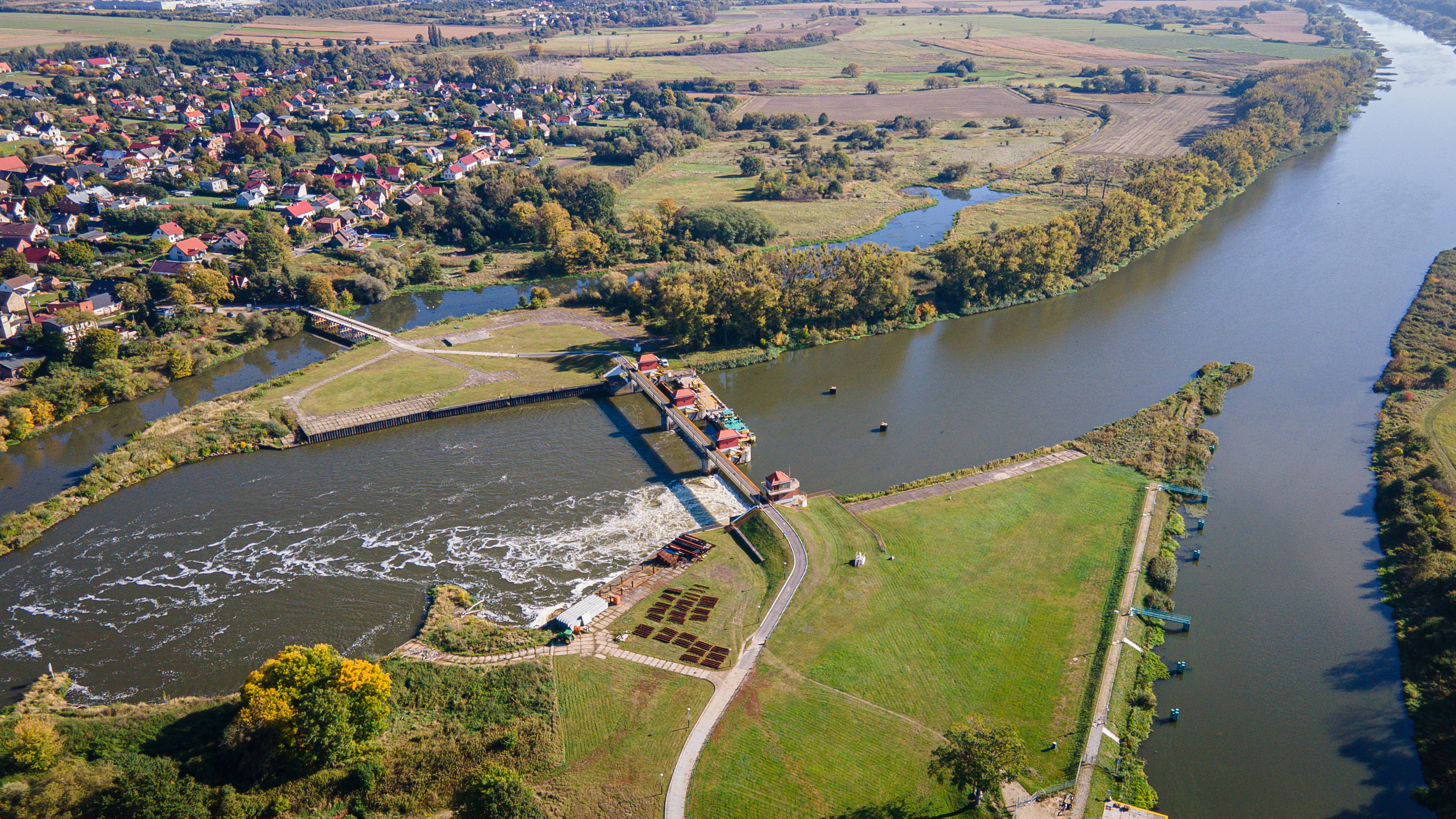
- Ratowice Weir

- Location within Poland
- Coordinates: 51°2′2″N 17°16′9″E
- Country: Poland
- Voivodeship: Lower Silesian
- County: Wrocław
- Gmina: Czernica

Population
  - Total: 1,100
- Time zone: UTC+1 (CET)
  - Summer (DST): UTC+2 (CEST)
- Postal code: 55-003
- Vehicle registration: DWR

Ratowice [ratɔˈvit͡sɛ] is a village in the administrative district of Gmina Czernica, within Wrocław County, Lower Silesian Voivodeship, in south-western Poland.

During World War II, from August 1940 to April 1943, Nazi Germany operated a forced labour camp for Jewish men in the village.
