= Gmina Czernica =

Gmina Czernica Czernica Commune
- Gmina
- Coat of arms
- Interactive map of Gmina Czernica
- Coordinates (Czernica): 51°02′47″N 17°14′38″E
- Country: Poland
- Voivodeship: Lower Silesian
- County: Wrocław
- Seat: Czernica
- Sołectwos: Chrząstawa Mała, Chrząstawa Wielka, Czernica, Dobrzykowice, Gajków, Jeszkowice, Kamieniec Wrocławski, Krzyków, Łany, Nadolice Małe, Nadolice Wielkie, Ratowice, Wojnowice

Area
  - Total: 84.18 km^{2} (32.50 sq mi)

Population (2019-06-30)
  - Total: 16,070
  - Density: 190.9/km^{2} (494.4/sq mi)
- Website: https://www.czernica.pl

Gmina Czernica is a rural gmina (administrative district) in Wrocław County, Lower Silesian Voivodeship, in south-western Poland. Its seat is the village of Czernica, which lies approximately 17 kilometres (11 mi) south-east of the regional capital Wrocław. It is part of the Wrocław metropolitan area.

The gmina covers an area of 84.18 square kilometres (32.5 sq mi). As of 2019, its total population was 16,070.

== Neighbouring gminas ==
Gmina Czernica is bordered by the city of Wrocław and by the gminas of Bierutów, Długołęka, Jelcz-Laskowice, Oława, Oleśnica and Siechnice.

== Villages ==
The gmina contains the villages of Chrząstawa Mała, Chrząstawa Wielka, Czernica, Dobrzykowice, Gajków, Jeszkowice, Kamieniec Wrocławski, Krzyków, Łany, Nadolice Małe, Nadolice Wielkie, Ratowice and Wojnowice.
