= John Paul II Square, Wrocław =

Square in Wrocław, Poland

Coordinates: 51.11168°N 17.02176°E

John Paul II Square
- plac Jana Pawła II
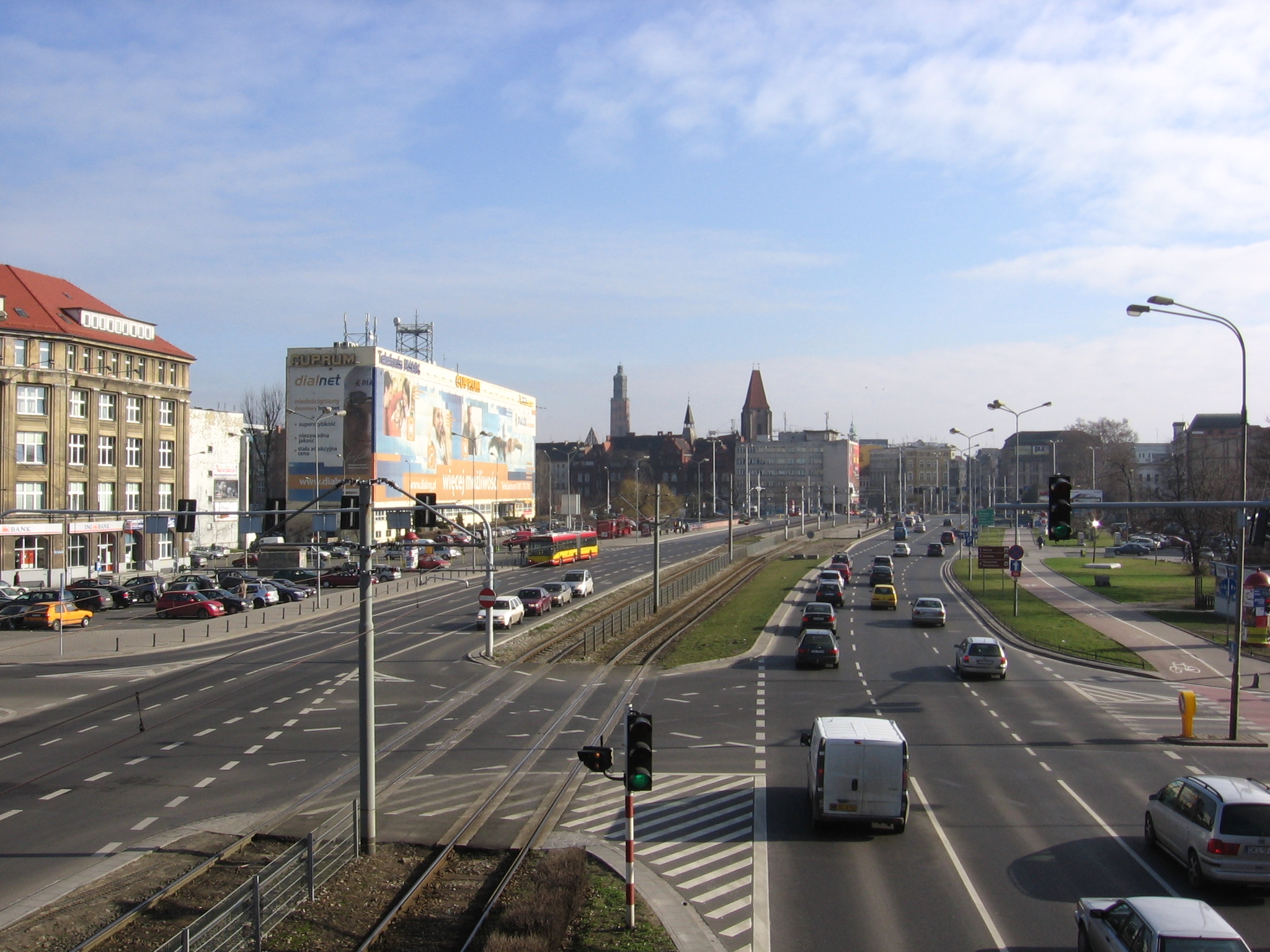
- Location: Wrocław, Lower Silesian Voivodeship, Poland

The John Paul II Square (Polish: plac Jana Pawła II [plat͡s ˈjana ˈpavwa druˈɡʲɛɡɔ]) is a square and important transit point in Wrocław, Poland. The square is situated in the Szczepin district.

== Name ==
The square was originally known in German as An-der-Königsbrücke-Platz ('square by the Royal Bridge'), before the name was eventually shortened to Königsplatz ('Royal Square').

After the siege of Breslau, due to the city's incorporation into Poland, the name was changed to plac 1 Maja ('May 1 Square'), named after the International Workers' Day. In 2006, the name was changed to plac Jana Pawła II ('John Paul II Square'), after John Paul II, who died the preceding year.

== History ==
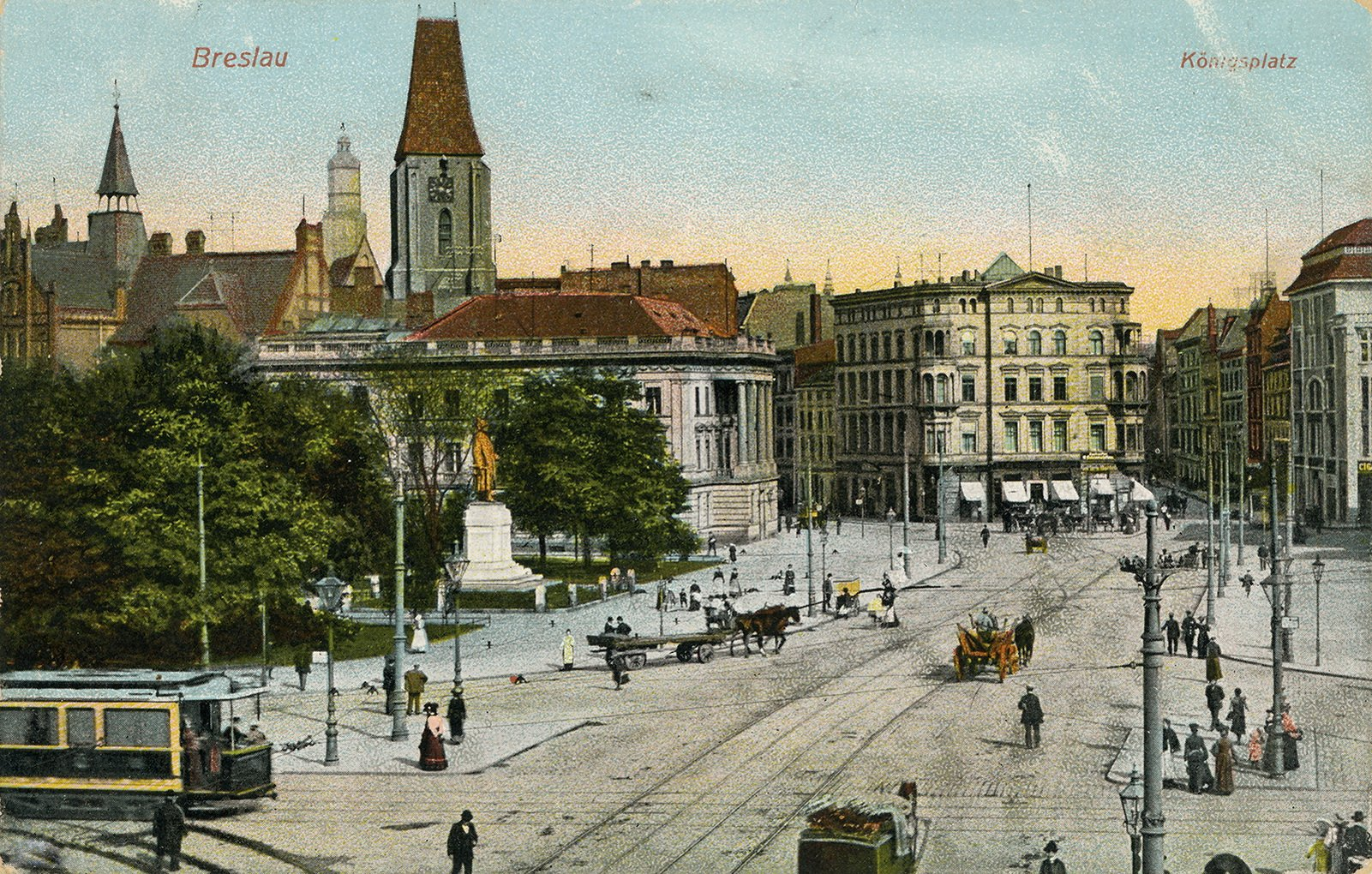
Königsplatz, Breslau (c. 1909)

The square was created on the site of the Nikolaitor ('Nicholas Gate', Polish: Brama Mikołajska), which was demolished in 1820. In 1900, a statue of Otto von Bismarck was erected on the northern side of the square. On the opposite side, a fountain named Bismarckbrunnen ('Bismarck Fountain') with sculptures by Ernst Seger was built. After the war, the fountain was renamed 'Allegory of Struggle and Victory' (Polish: Alegoria Walki i Zwycięstwa).

In 1945, the majority of the buildings in the square were demolished due to damage sustained during the siege of Breslau. The only surviving structure is a tenement house dating back to 1841, which was later rebuilt in 1879 as a neo-Renaissance palace. Today, it serves as the seat of Wrocław Academy of Music.

In 2023, the Infinity office building was opened at the John Paul II Square.
