= Velykyi Khodachkiv =

- Village
- Location of Velykyi Khodachkiv within Ukraine
- Coordinates: 49°29′14″N 25°25′28″E
- Country: Ukraine
- Oblast: Ternopil Oblast
- Raion: Ternopil Raion

Velykyi Khodachkiv (Ukrainian: Великий Ходачків, Polish: Chodaczków Wielki) is a selo in Ternopil Raion, Ternopil Oblast, Ukraine. It lies on the banks of the Rudka river, on the rail line from Ternopil to Rohatyn. Velykyi Khodachkiv belongs to Pidhorodnie rural hromada, one of the hromadas of Ukraine. The population is 1394 people (2003 census).

The first mentions of the village date back to 1758. On 16 April 1944 the village was almost totally razed. Of the 710 houses in the village only 30 were left standing. From 1944-46, 210 ethnic Ukrainian families from prewar Poland were resettled there.

== History ==
The village was the location of the Chodaczków Wielki massacre during World War II. Chodaczków Wielki was an ethnically Polish village before the Soviet invasion of Poland. According to Polish historian, Grzegorz Hryciuk, on 16 April 1944 the village was destroyed by the Ukrainian 4th SS Police Regiment then subordinated to SS-Galizien. The estimates of victims range from 250 to 854. Chodaczków Wielki massacre is alleged to have been one of the biggest massacres of Poles in the region of Eastern Galicia.

Poles who escaped the massacre buried the dead in a communal grave, in front of the local Roman Catholic church. After the World War II, Polish survivors were forced to leave the village, deported by the Soviet authorities to new communist Poland. They settled as a group around Gogolin and Niemodlin in the Opole Voivodeship.

Until 18 July 2020, Velykyi Khodachkiv belonged to Kozova Raion. The raion was abolished in July 2020 as part of the administrative reform of Ukraine, which reduced the number of raions of Ternopil Oblast to three. The area of Kozova Raion was merged into Ternopil Raion.

== See also ==
- Massacres of Poles in Volhynia
- Huta Pieniacka massacre
- Pidkamin massacre

== Sources ==
- War crimes of Ukrainian soldiers SS-Galizien
- Memoirs of Teofila Kolodenna, born in 1929 in Chodaczkow Wielki
- Table with number of victims in Tarnopol poviat
