= Wrocław Academy of Music =

Coordinates: 51°06′40″N 17°01′15″E

Karol Lipiński Academy of Music
- Akademia Muzyczna im. Karola Lipińskiego
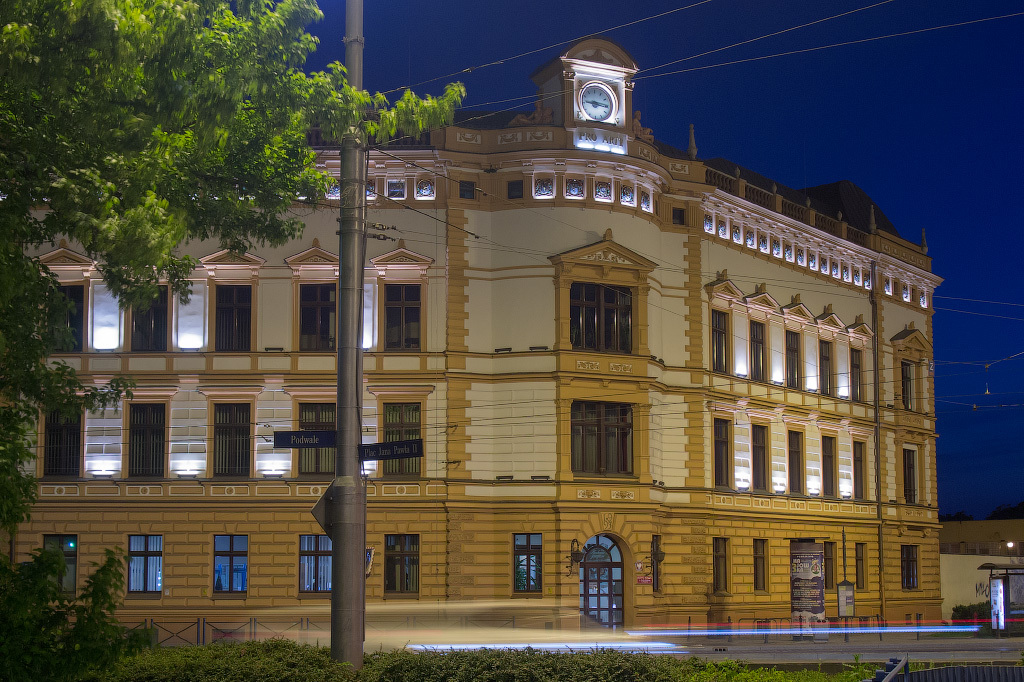

Information
- Established: November 1948
- Rector: Krystian Kiełb
- Address: John Paul II Square 2 Wrocław, Lower Silesian Voivodeship, Poland

The Karol Lipiński Academy of Music (Polish: Akademia Muzyczna im. Karola Lipińskiego, 'AMKL') is a university level school of music in Wrocław, Poland. It was established in November 1948 and is located on John Paul II Square.

== Departments ==
- Department of Composition, Conducting, Theory of Music and Music Therapy
- Instrumental Department provides classes in:
  - keyboard instruments (piano, harpsichord, organ, and accordion),
  - string instruments (violin, viola, cello, viola da gamba, contrabass),
  - woodwind instruments (flute, recorder, western concert flute, oboe, baroque oboe, clarinet, saxophone, bassoon),
  - brass instruments (trumpet, horn, trombone, tuba),
  - percussion instruments,
  - guitar
  - jazz instruments (piano, clarinet, saxophone, trump, trombone, contrabass and percussion).
- Vocal Department educates singers in vocal acting and song-oratorio.
- Music Education Department has a string orchestra and two coeducational choirs: "Feichtinum" and "The Stanislaw Krukowski Choir".

== See also ==
- Karol Lipiński
