= Czernica, Wrocław County =

Czernica
- Village
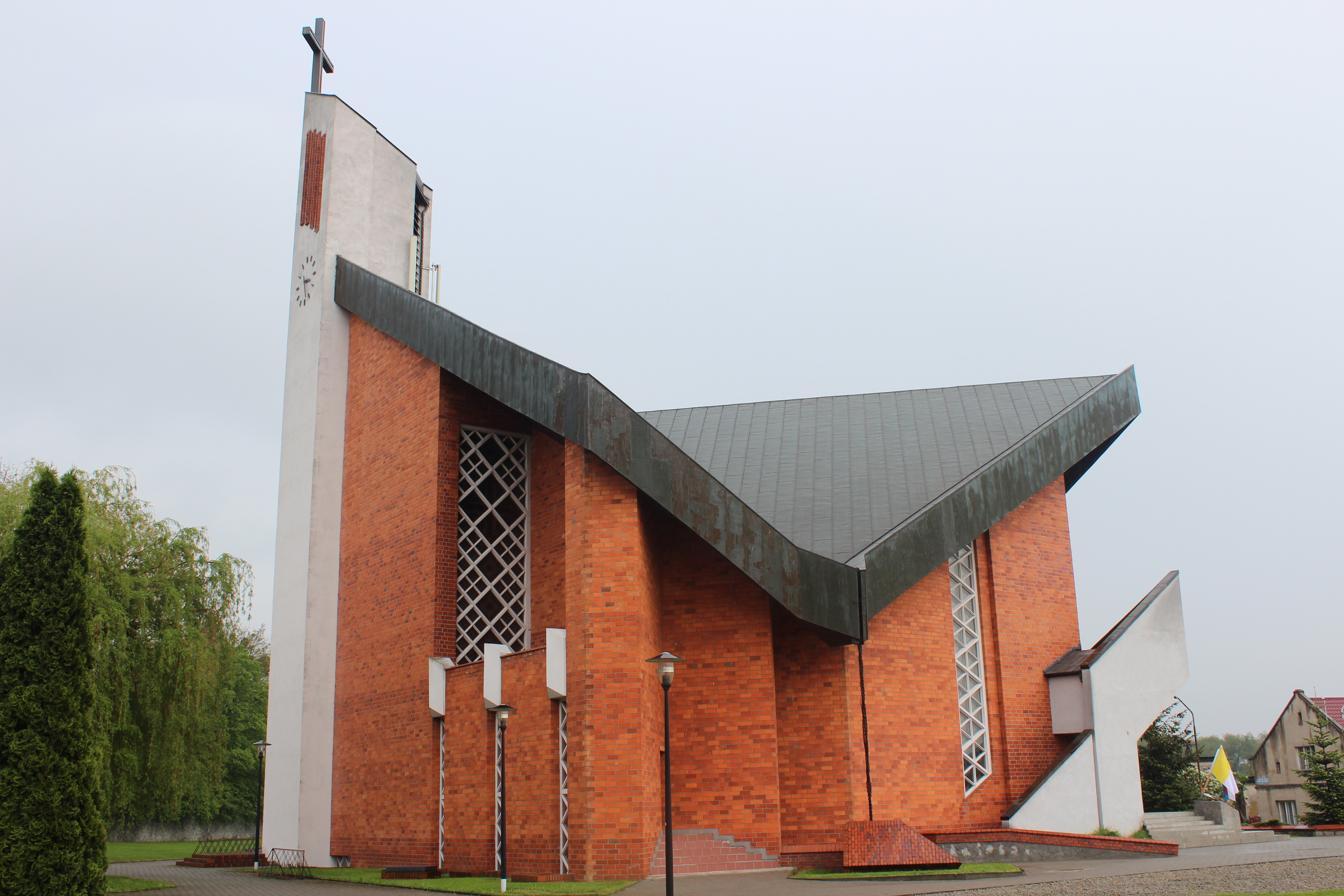
- Church of the Exaltation of the Holy Cross

- Location within Poland
- Coordinates: 51°02′47″N 17°14′38″E
- Country: Poland
- Voivodeship: Lower Silesian
- County: Wrocław
- Gmina: Czernica

Population
  - Total: 1,000

Czernica [t͡ʂɛrˈnit͡sa] is a village in Wrocław County, Lower Silesian Voivodeship, in south-western Poland. It is the seat of the administrative district (gmina) called Gmina Czernica.

== Monuments ==
- Marian column of 1708.

== Notable people ==
- Anna Sobolak (born 1979), Polish politician and businessperson
