= Szczepin =

District in Wrocław, Poland

- District of Wrocław
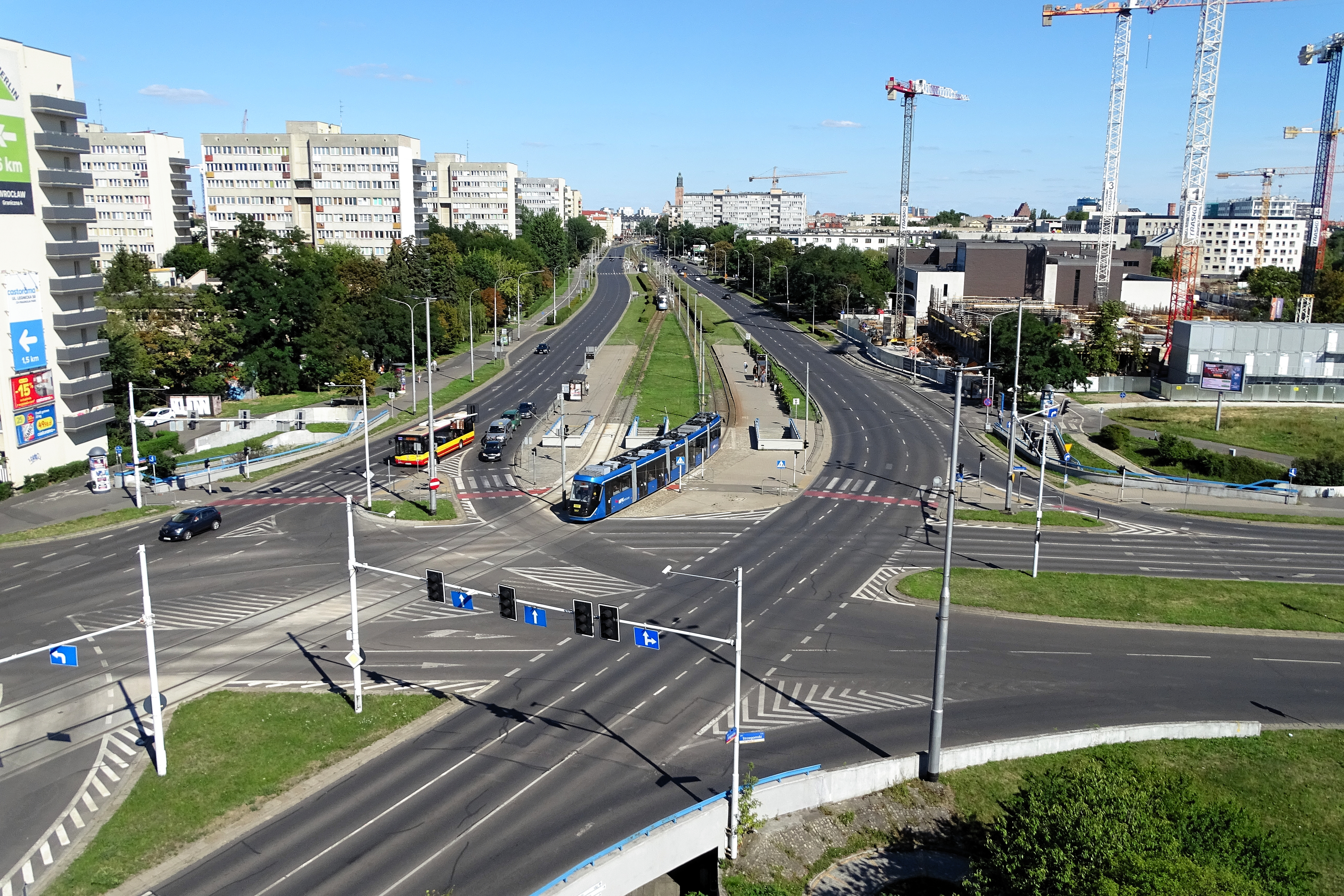
- Plac Strzegomski (Strzegom Square)

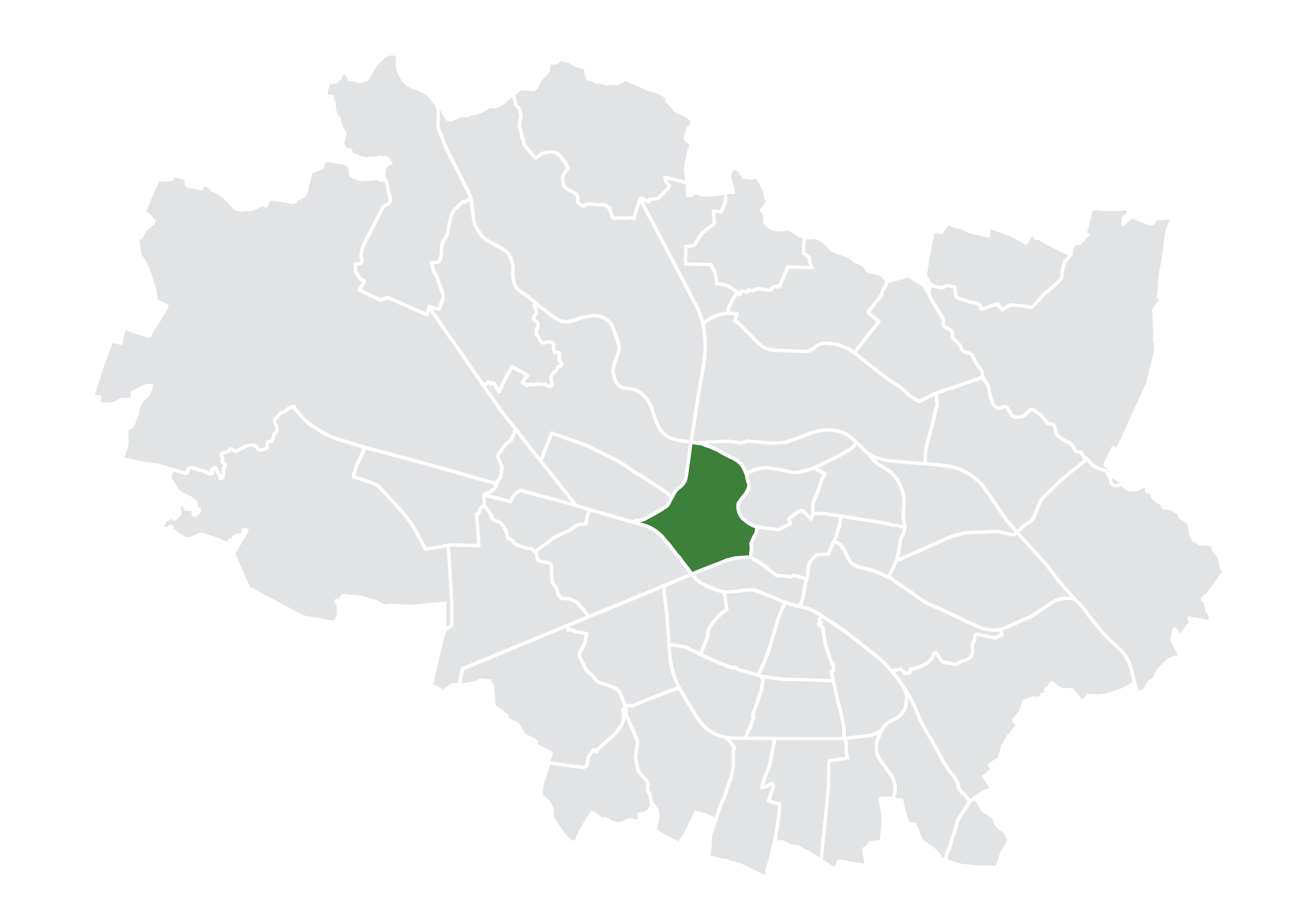
- Location of Szczepin within Wrocław
- Country: Poland
- Voivodeship: Lower Silesian
- County/City: Wrocław
- Incorporated into the city: 1808
- Established the modern-day district: 1991

Population (2022)
  - Total: 18,488
- Time zone: UTC+1 (CET)
  - Summer (DST): UTC+2 (CEST)
- Area code: +48 71
- Website: Osiedle Szczepin

Szczepin (Polish pronunciation: [ˈʂt͡ʂɛpin], German: Tschepine, [ˈt͡ʃɛpɪn]), also known as Przedmieście Mikołajskie (German: Nikolai Vorstadt), is a district in Wrocław, Poland, located in the central part of the city. It was established in the territory of the former Old Town district.

== Name ==
The first mention of the settlement, under the name of Stepin, can be found in historical documents from 1175. At that time, it was a simple fishing village. In 1257, the settlement began to belong to St. Clare's Monastery and was renamed Scepin, thanks to the grant of Henry III the White. As early as 1669, the village was called Tscheppin or Tschepine on all maps of Lower Silesia, which is a Germanized version of the name.

Currently, there are two theories regarding the origin of the name of the settlement. The name is debated to derive from the first mention of the settlement using the words Stapin/Stepin, which refer to the words 'foot' or 'step'. German linguist Paul Heffner has debated the etymology of this name. It was suggested that the name of the settlement refers to the personal name of Szczep, who was among the earliest tenants of the village.

== History ==
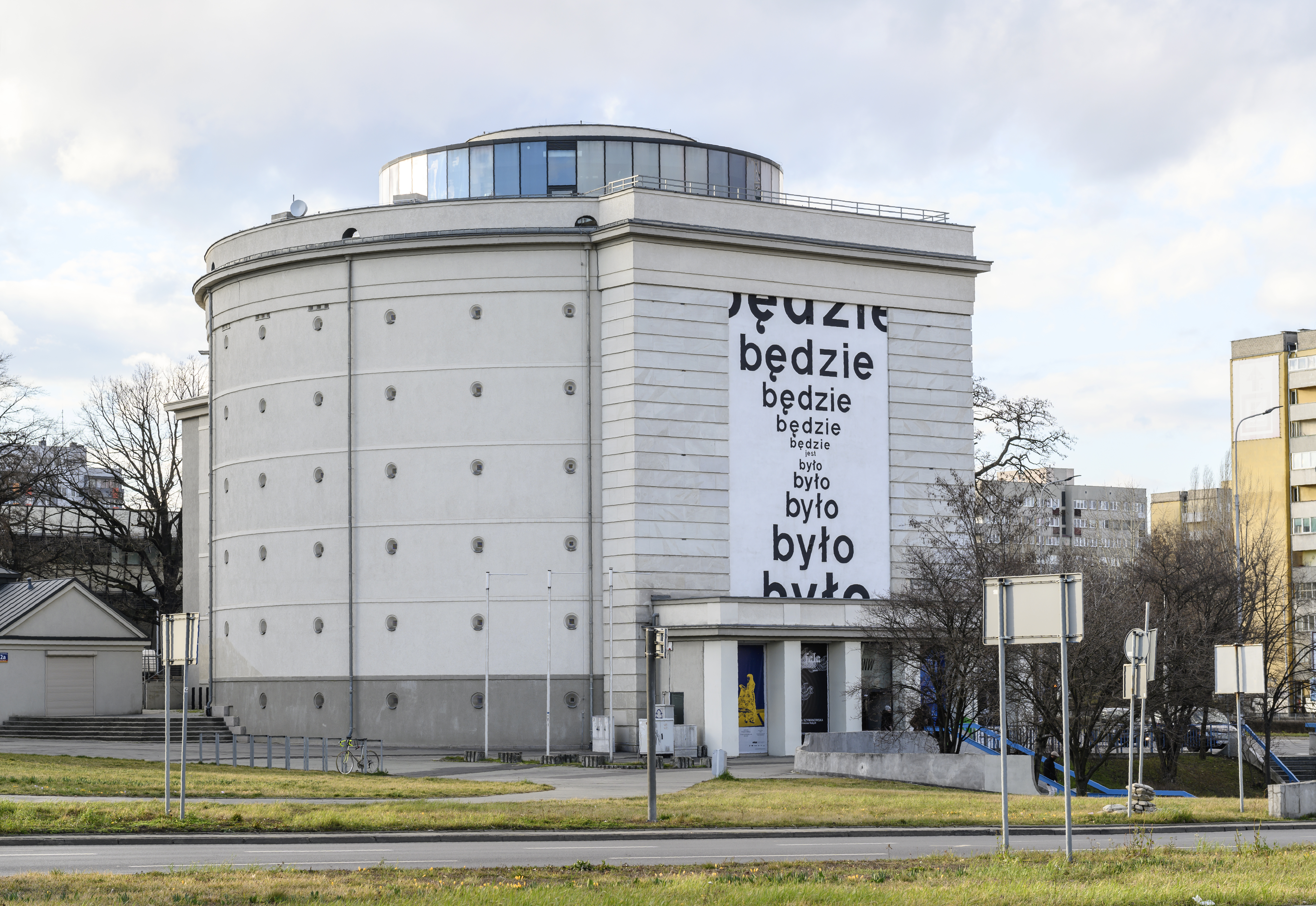
Preserved air-raid shelter from World War II, now housing the Wrocław Contemporary Museum

In the 16th century, Tschepine was a fishing village, described as "long, wide and clean." Initially a village, the settlement was incorporated into Breslau (today's Wrocław) in 1808. As late as the mid-19th century, the settlement's buildings were still rural in character. The exception was the main exit road to the west of the city, now Legnicka Street, which was paved and built up with townhouses.

During the siege of Breslau, Tschepine was almost completely destroyed. The last attack by Soviet troops was successfully halted here. A remnant of World War II, the Strzegom Bunker, which was built in 1942, now houses the city's contemporary museum.

Szczepin has undergone rapid development since the 1960s. In the 1970s, the modern Dolmed Medical Diagnostic Center was built in the district. At the end of 1995, the largest self-service store in Poland at the time was established on Długa Street, which was a significant milestone for the area.

In 1991, after reforms in the administrative division of Wrocław, Szczepin became one of the city's 48 districts.

In the 21st century, numerous office buildings have been constructed in the southern part of the district, including the headquarters of Santander Bank, Nokia, 3M, and Vorwerk.

== Gallery ==
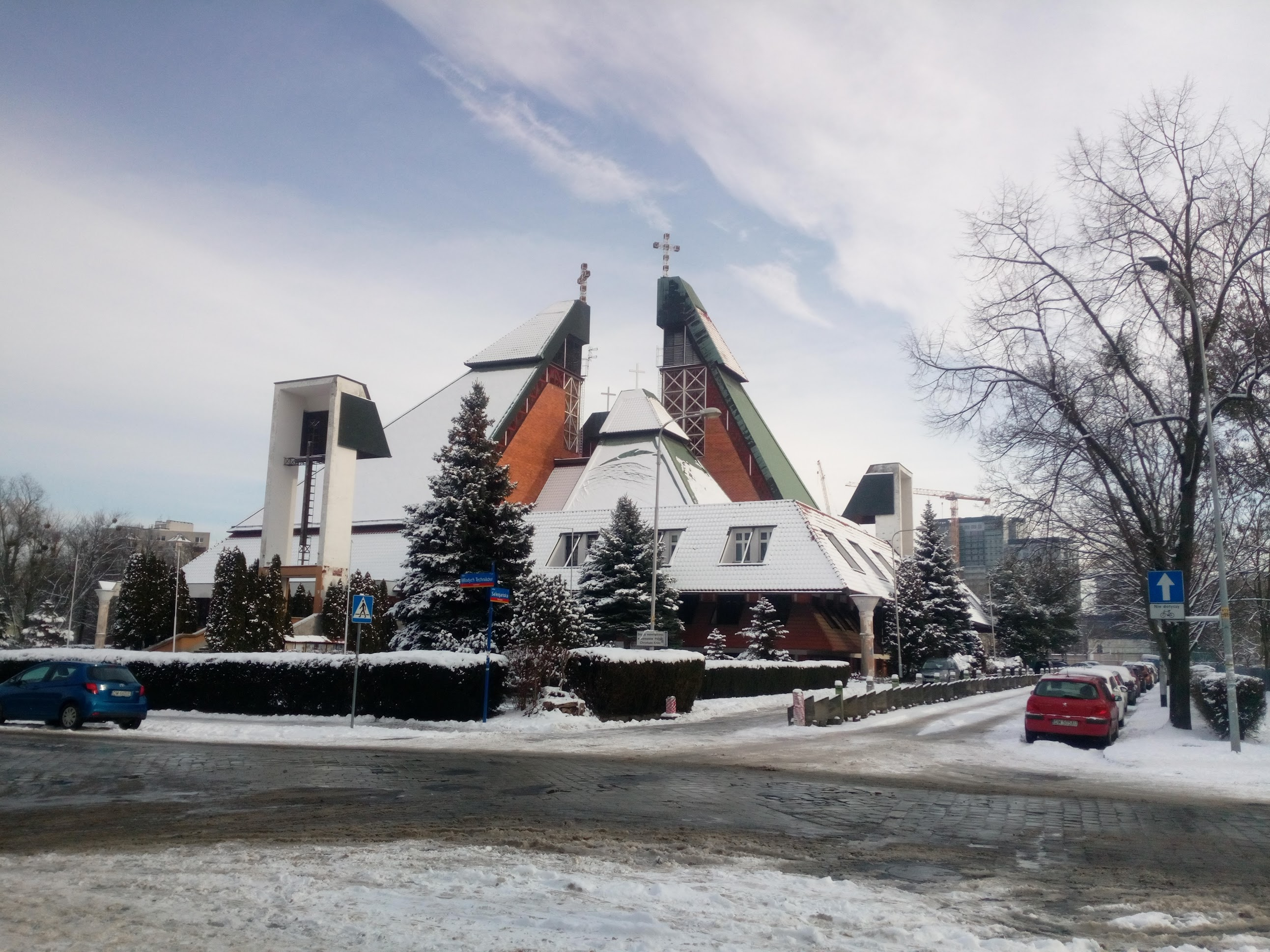
Church of Christ the King

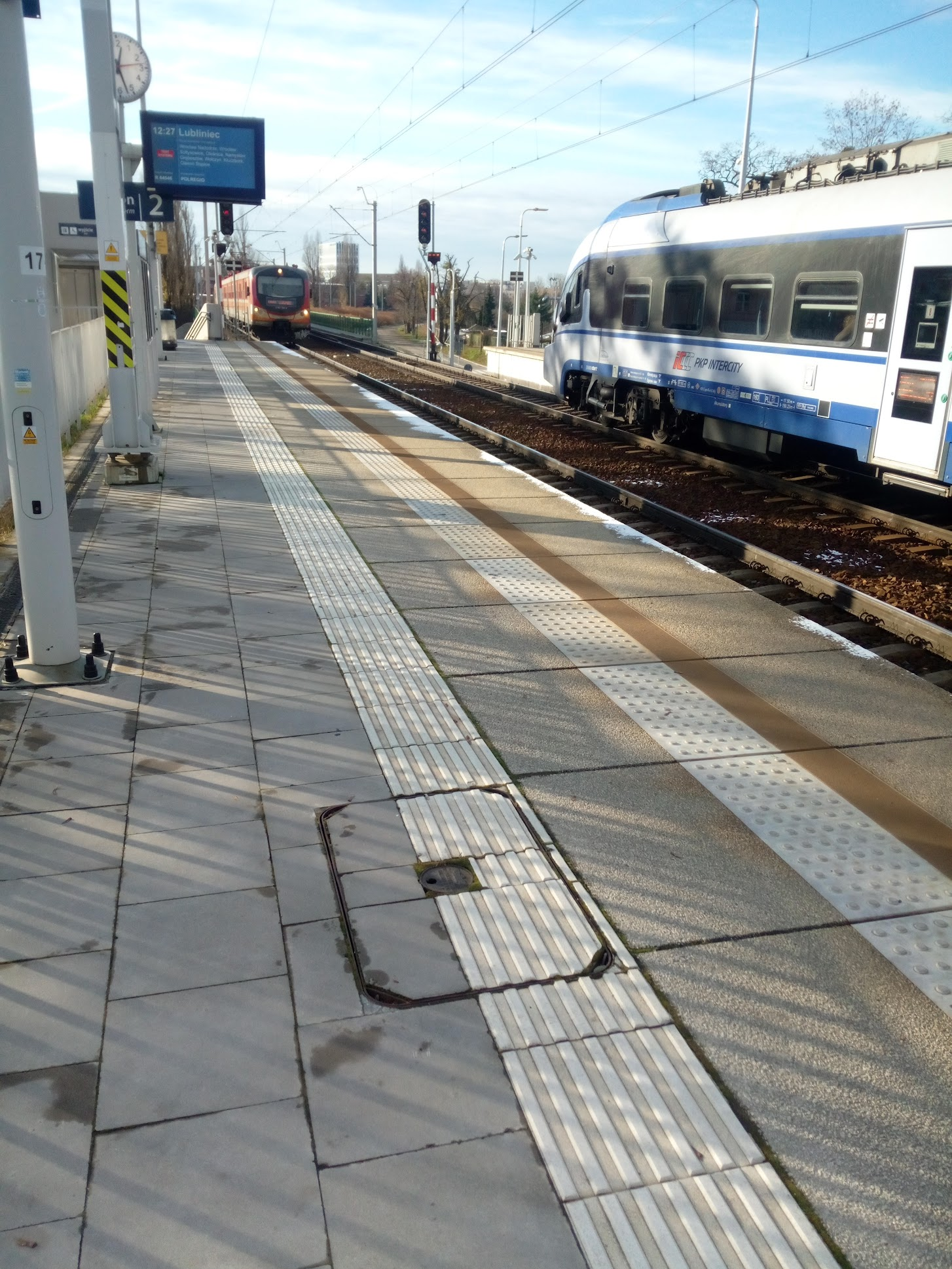
Wrocław Szczepin Train Station

== See also ==
- John Paul II Square, a square in the district
