= Powstańców Śląskich =

District in Wrocław, Poland

Coordinates: 51°05′36″N 17°01′13″E

- District of Wrocław
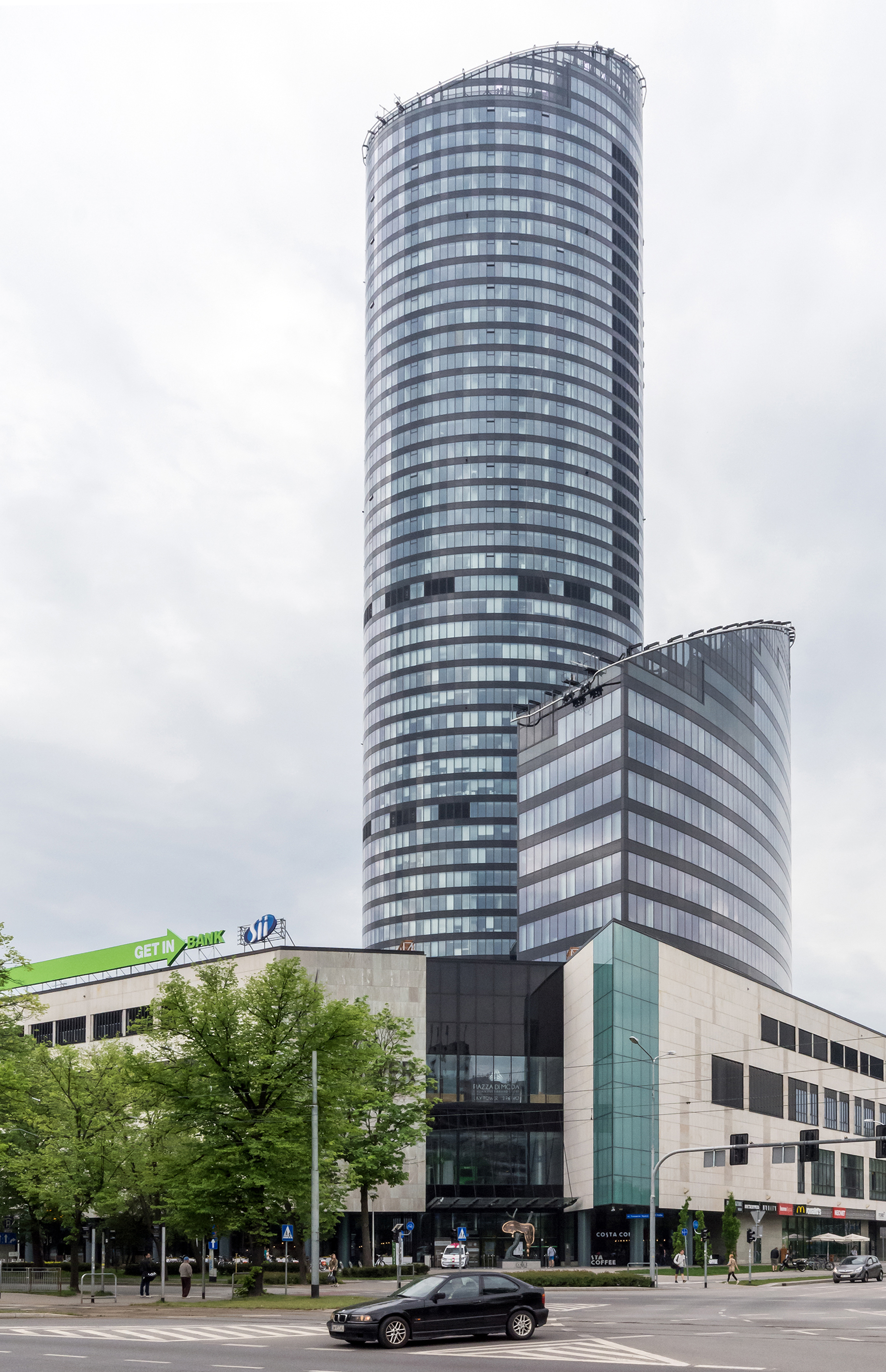
- Sky Tower

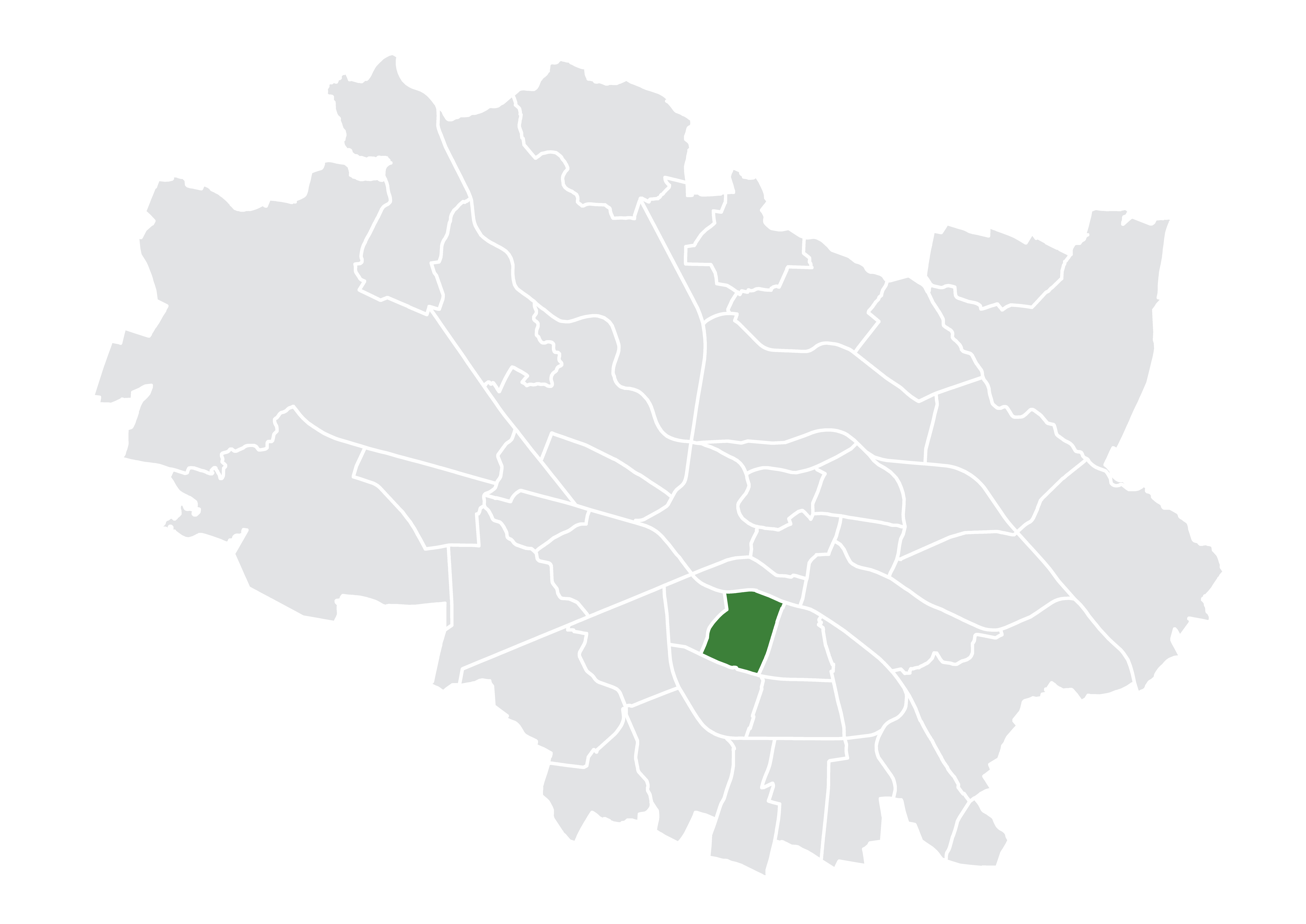
- Location of Powstańców Śląskich within Wrocław
- Country: Poland
- Voivodeship: Lower Silesian
- County/City: Wrocław
- Incorporated into the city: 1868
- Established the modern-day district: 1991

Population (2022)
  - Total: 24,329
- Time zone: UTC+1 (CET)
  - Summer (DST): UTC+2 (CEST)
- Area code: +48 71
- Website: Osiedle Powstańców Śląskich

Powstańców Śląskich (Polish: [pɔfˈstaj̃t͡suf ˈɕlɔ̃skʲix], lit. '[district] of Silesian Insurgents'; German: Neudorf [ˈnɔʏdɔʁf]), also sometimes referred to as Południe (Polish: [pɔˈwudɲɛ]), is a district in Wrocław, Poland, located in the southern part of the city. It was established in the territory of the former Krzyki district.

Once a prestigious neighborhood of the city, it was destroyed during the siege of Breslau. Today, it is a site of intense commercial and residential development. It houses the city's tallest skyscraper, the Sky Tower.

== History ==
The settlement in the area dates back to 1362. In 1868, Neudorf was formally incorporated into the city. The road that extended downtown Schweidnitzer Straße (modern-day Świdnicka Street) was renamed from Kleinburger Chausse to Kleinburgerstraße. Kleinburgerstraße was then widened, creating two green lanes with a total width of 27 meters.

The main street running through the neighborhood, now known as Powstańców Śląskich Street, then became known as Kaiser-Wilhelm-Straße. In 1911, a traffic circle was laid out in the southern part of the neighborhood. This area was considered one of the more exclusive settlements in the city at the time.

During the siege of Breslau, this area of the city became the axis of the Red Army forces' advance toward the city center. After the war, the settlement was almost completely destroyed, and the communist authorities rebuilt only what did not require major reconstruction.

The district's present-day name is derived from Powstańców Śląskich Street, which is the central street running through the area. The street is named after the Silesian Uprisings.

In 1991, after reforms in the administrative division of Wrocław, Powstańców Śląskich became one of the city's 48 districts.

Today, the neighborhood continues to develop rapidly with the construction of new residential, commercial, and office buildings. The tallest building in Wrocław, the Sky Tower, was opened in the district in 2012. Located in the district is the Silesian Insurgents Square, the city's major traffic circle also known as Rondo ('The Roundabout').
