= Chrząstawa Mała =

- Village
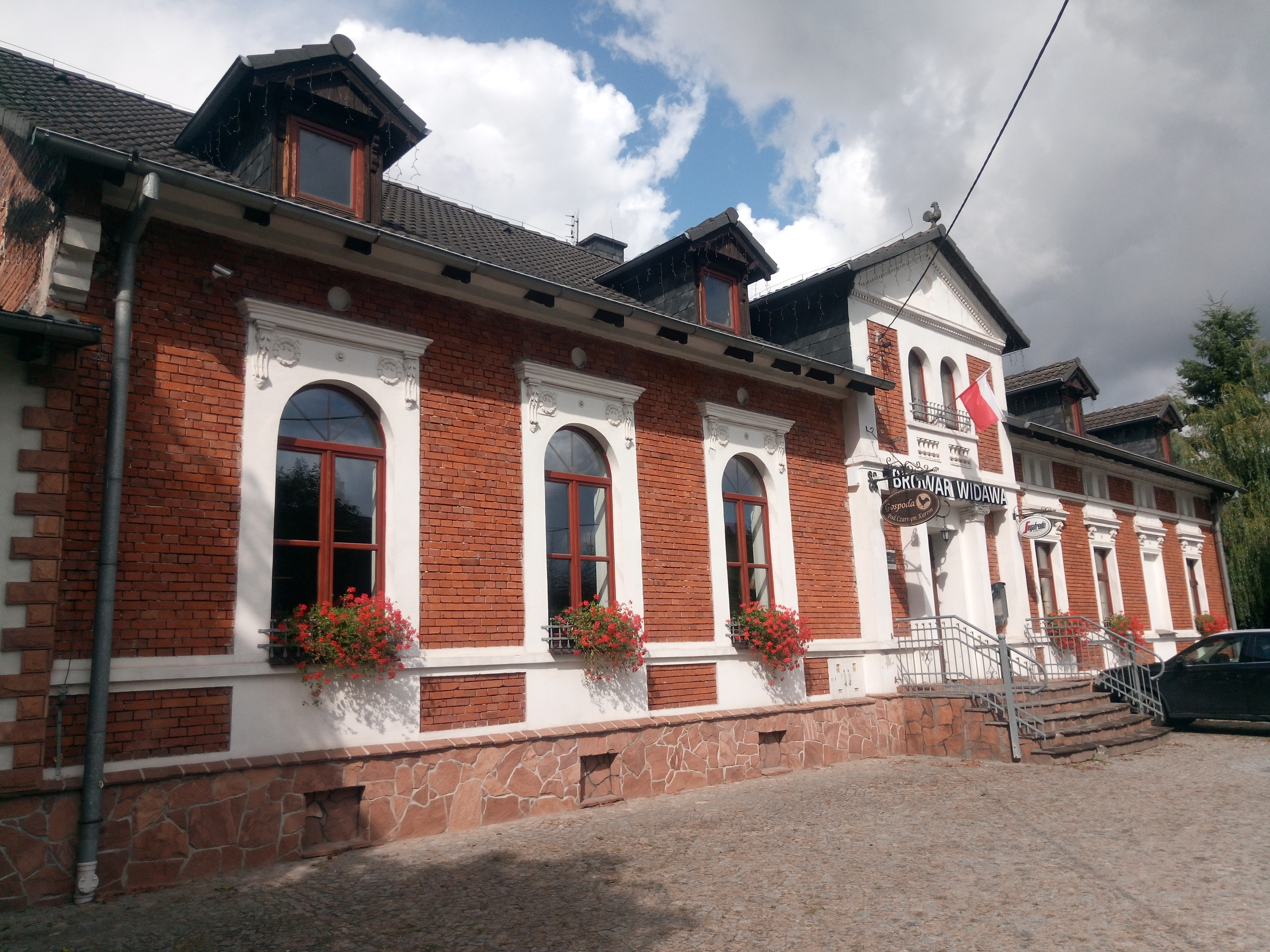

- Location within Poland
- Coordinates: 51°4′55″N 17°16′57″E
- Country: Poland
- Voivodeship: Lower Silesian
- County: Wrocław
- Gmina: Czernica

Chrząstawa Mała [xʂɔ̃sˈtava ˈmawa] is a village in the administrative district of Gmina Czernica, within Wrocław County, Lower Silesian Voivodeship, in south-western Poland.
