= Wojnowice, Wrocław County =

Wojnowice
- Village
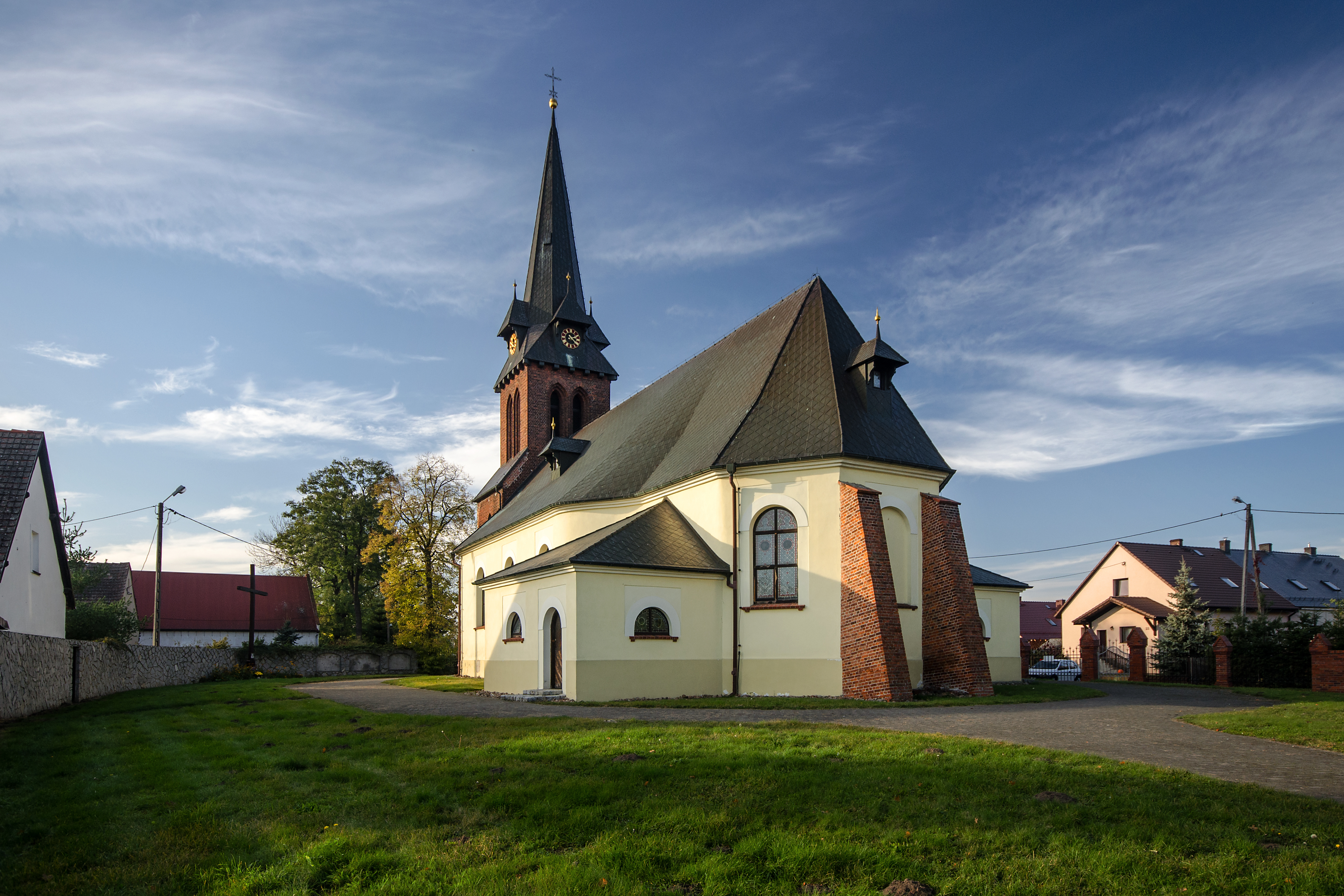
- Catholic church

- Location within Poland
- Coordinates: 51°4′N 17°15′E
- Country: Poland
- Voivodeship: Lower Silesian
- County: Wrocław
- Gmina: Czernica

Wojnowice [vɔi̯nɔˈvit͡sɛ] is a village in the administrative district of Gmina Czernica, within Wrocław County, Lower Silesian Voivodeship, in south-western Poland.
