= Dobrzykowice =

- Village
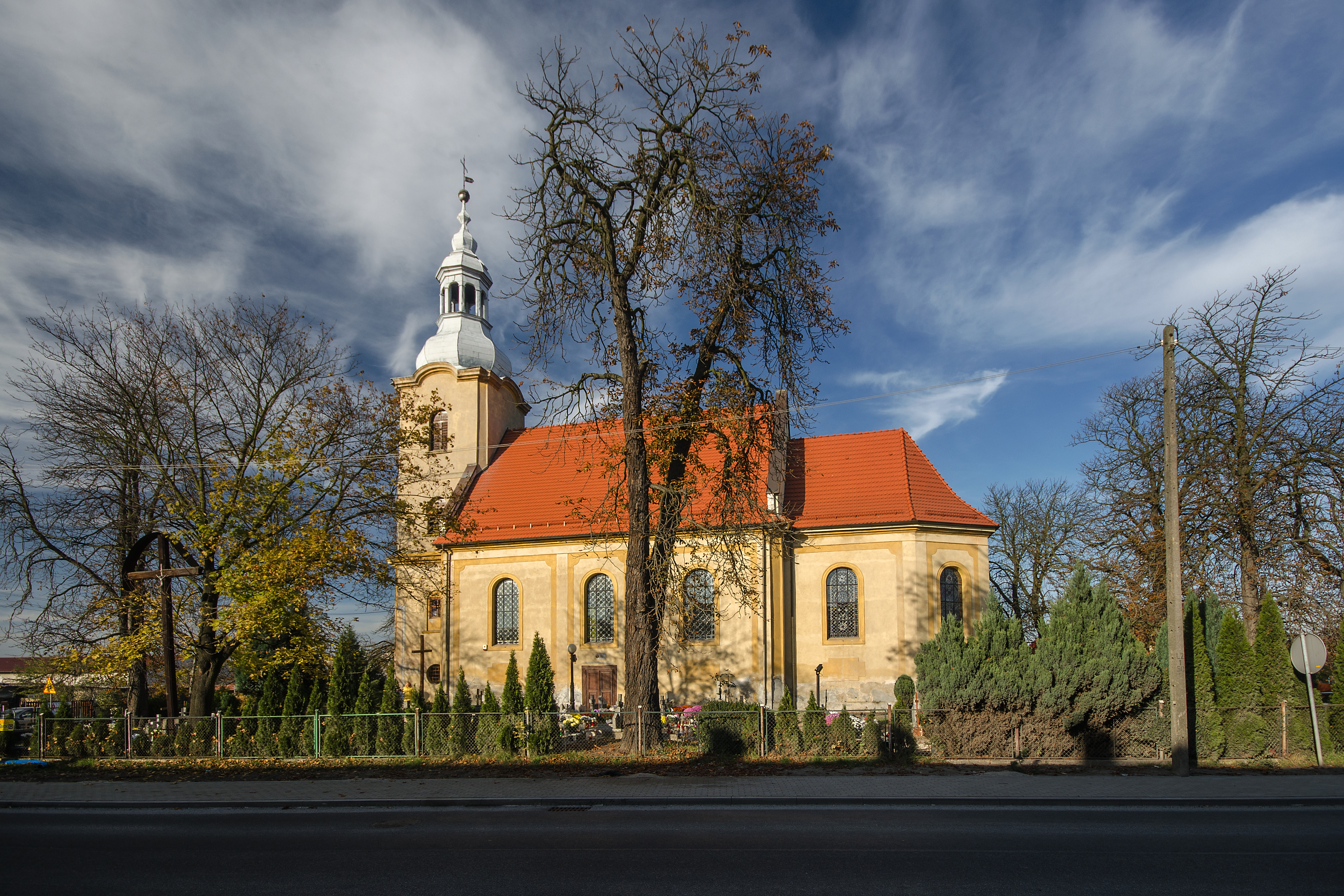
- Church of the Nativity of the Virgin Mary

- Location within Poland
- Coordinates: 51°05′46″N 17°11′33″E
- Country: Poland
- Voivodeship: Lower Silesian
- County: Wrocław
- Gmina: Czernica

Population
  - Total: 1,114 (2,011)

Dobrzykowice [dɔbʐɨkɔˈvit͡sɛ] is a village in the administrative district of Gmina Czernica, within Wrocław County, Lower Silesian Voivodeship, in south-western Poland.

== History ==
In 1946, the town was incorporated into the newly formed Wroclaw Voivodship in post-war Poland. The German-speaking population living in the village was displaced to Germany.
