= Łany, Lower Silesian Voivodeship =

Łany
- Village
- Location within Poland
- Coordinates: 51°4′55″N 17°9′41″E
- Country: Poland
- Voivodeship: Lower Silesian
- County: Wrocław
- Gmina: Czernica

Łany [ˈwanɨ] is a village in the administrative district of Gmina Czernica, within Wrocław County, Lower Silesian Voivodeship, in south-western Poland.
