= Krzyków, Lower Silesian Voivodeship =

Krzyków
- Village
- Location within Poland
- Coordinates: 51°05′59″N 17°13′23″E
- Country: Poland
- Voivodeship: Lower Silesian
- County: Wrocław
- Gmina: Czernica
- Population: 159

Krzyków [ˈkʂɨkuf] is a village in the administrative district of Gmina Czernica, within Wrocław County, Lower Silesian Voivodeship, in south-western Poland.
