= Nadolice Małe =

- Village
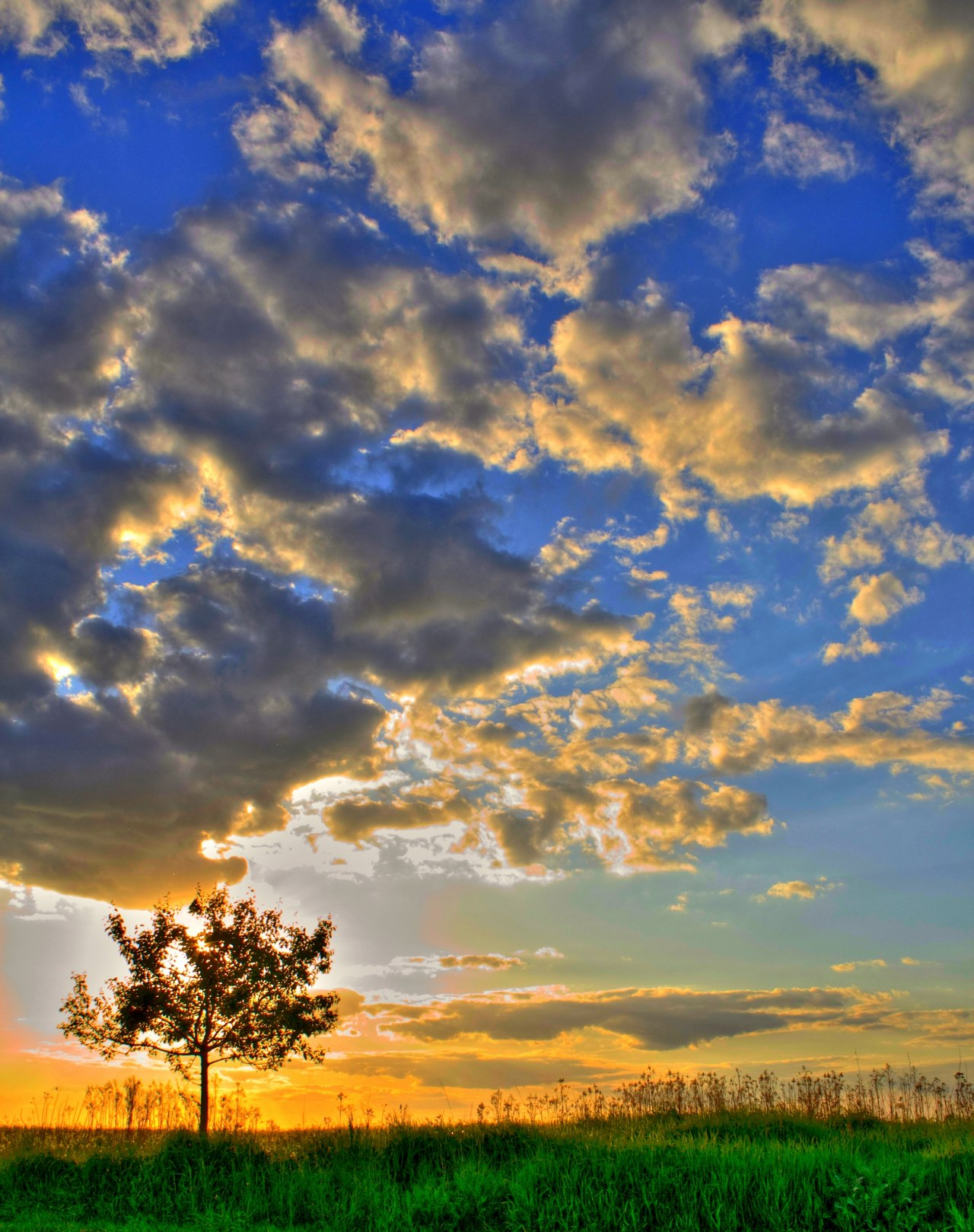

- Location within Poland
- Coordinates: 51°05′14″N 17°13′14″E
- Country: Poland
- Voivodeship: Lower Silesian
- County: Wrocław
- Gmina: Czernica

Nadolice Małe [nadɔˈlit͡sɛ ˈmawɛ] is a village in the administrative district of Gmina Czernica, within Wrocław County, Lower Silesian Voivodeship, in south-western Poland.
