= Anna Sobolak =

Polish politician and businessperson (born 1979)

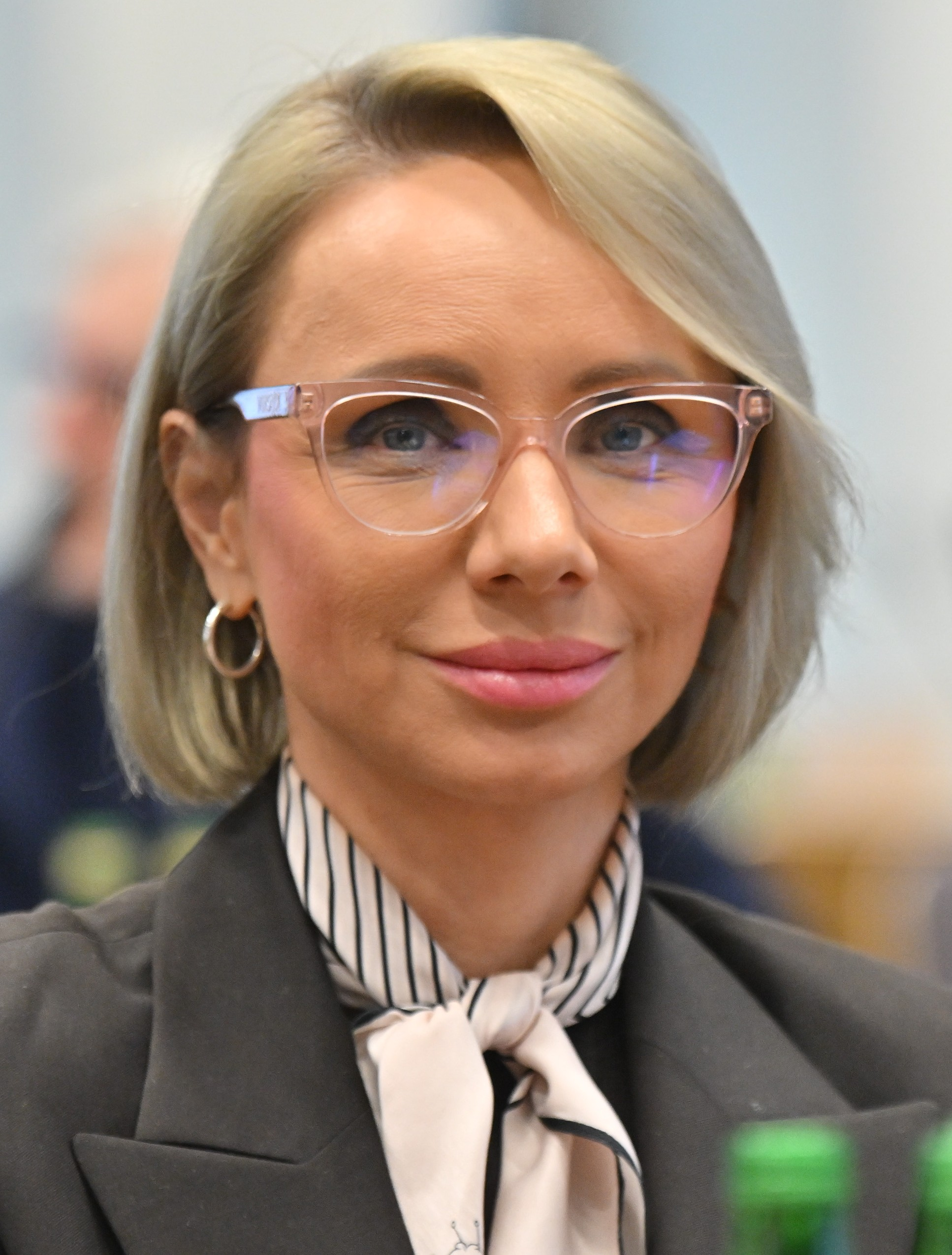
- Anna Sobolak in 2026.

Member of the Sejm of Poland
- Incumbent
- Assumed office 13 November 2023
- Constituency: No. 3

Member of the Wrocław County Council
- In office 20 November 2018 – 15 October 2023
- Constituency: No. 2

Personal details
- Born: Anna Helena Gałczyńska; 2 November 1979 (age 47) Lublin, Poland
- Party: Civic Coalition (since 2025)
- Other political affiliations: Civic Platform (until 2025)
- Education: Rzeszów University of Technology
- Occupation: Politician; Businessperson

Anna Helena Sobolak (Polish: [ˈan.na xɛˈlɛ.na soˈbo.lak]; née Gałczyńska, Polish: [ɡawˈt͡ʂɘ̟ɲ.ska]; born 2 November 1979) is a Polish politician and businessperson. Since 2023, she has been a member of the Sejm of Poland, representing the constituency no. 19, which consists of the city of Warsaw. Sobolak belongs to the Civic Coalition party, and was previously a member of the Civic Platform until 2025.

== Biography ==
Anna Sobolak (née Gałczyńska) was born on 2 November 1979 in Lublin, Poland. She graduated from the Rzeszów University of Technology, with a degree in engineering. Sobolak started her own business, and in 2006, became an owner of company Arkus. In 2008, she became a chairperson of the board of directors of the commercial law firm Kancelaria Doradztwa i Zarządzania Odpadami. Sobolak also worked for companies such as BASF. She is a co-founder and member of the Biorecykling Association.

Sobolak joined the Civic Platform party. In 2014, she unsuccessfully ran to become councilor in the Wrocław County, and was later elected in 2018. In 2019, Sobolak unsuccessfully ran for a seat in the Sejm of Poland in the constituency no. 19, which consists of the city of Warsaw. She received 2611 (0.4%). She was elected to the office in 2023 with 7,675 votes (0.99%). In 2025, her party, the Civic Platform, was transformed into the Civic Coalition.

== Personal life ==
Sobolak has three sons. She resides in the village of Czernica in Lower Silesian Voivodeship, Poland.

== Electoral results ==
Year	Office		Party	Constituency	Votes			Result	Ref.
Year	Office		Party	Constituency	Total	%	P.	Result	Ref.
2014	Wrocław County Council	5th	Civic Platform	No. 1	458	2.93	9th	Lost	
2018	Wrocław County Council	6th	Civic Coalition	No. 2	704	10.37	3rd	Won	
2019	Sejm of Poland	9th	Civic Coalition	No. 3	2,611	0.40	38th	Lost	
2023	Sejm of Poland	10th	Civic Coalition	No. 3	7,675	0.99	16th	Won	
