= Jeszkowice =

- Village
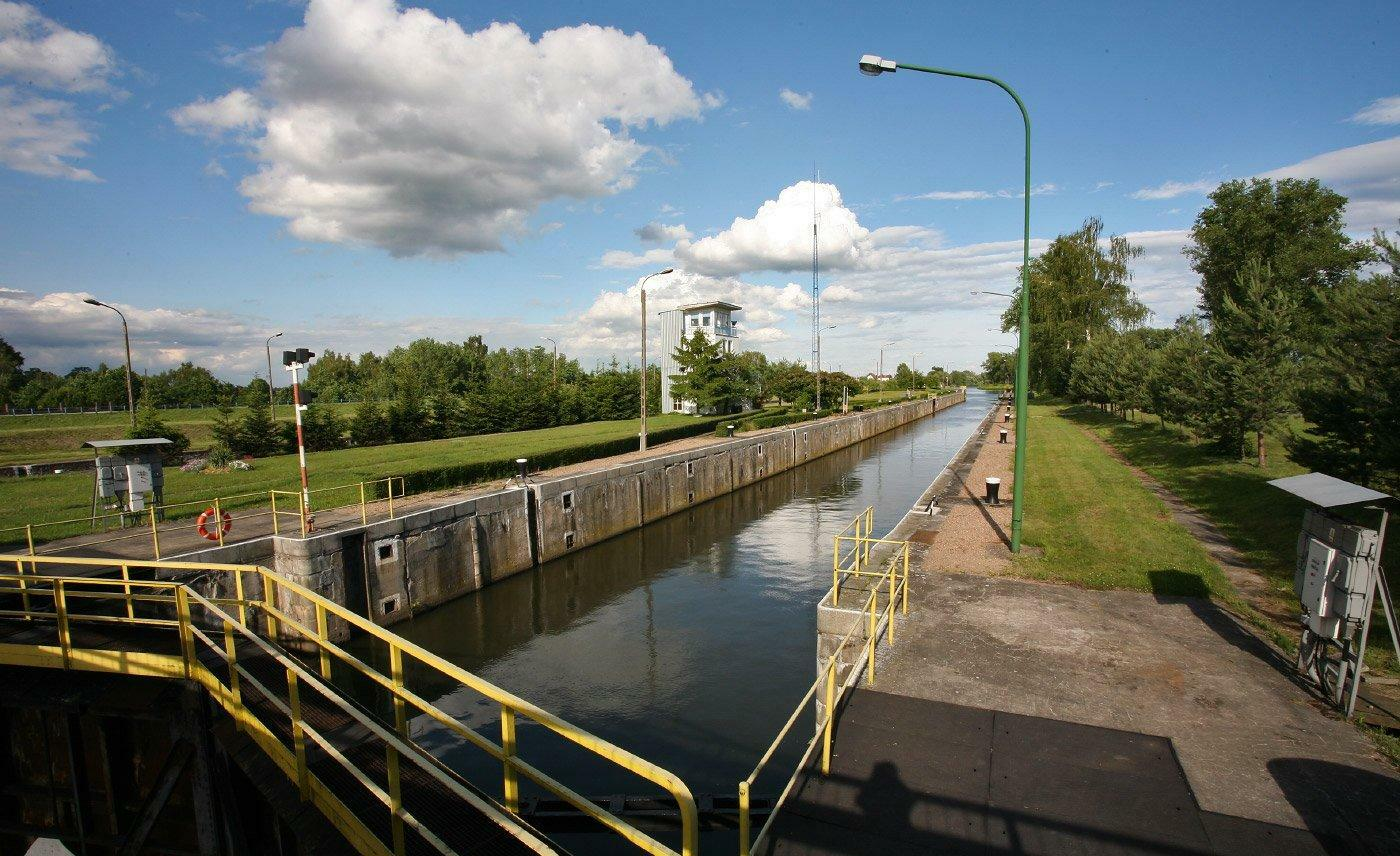

- Location within Poland
- Coordinates: 51°03′39″N 17°13′25″E
- Country: Poland
- Voivodeship: Lower Silesian
- County: Wrocław
- Gmina: Czernica

Jeszkowice [jɛʂkɔˈvit͡sɛ] is a village in the administrative district of Gmina Czernica, within Wrocław County, Lower Silesian Voivodeship, in south-western Poland.
