= Wrocław Contemporary Museum =

Art museum in Wrocław, Poland

Coordinates: 51°06′48″N 17°00′18″E

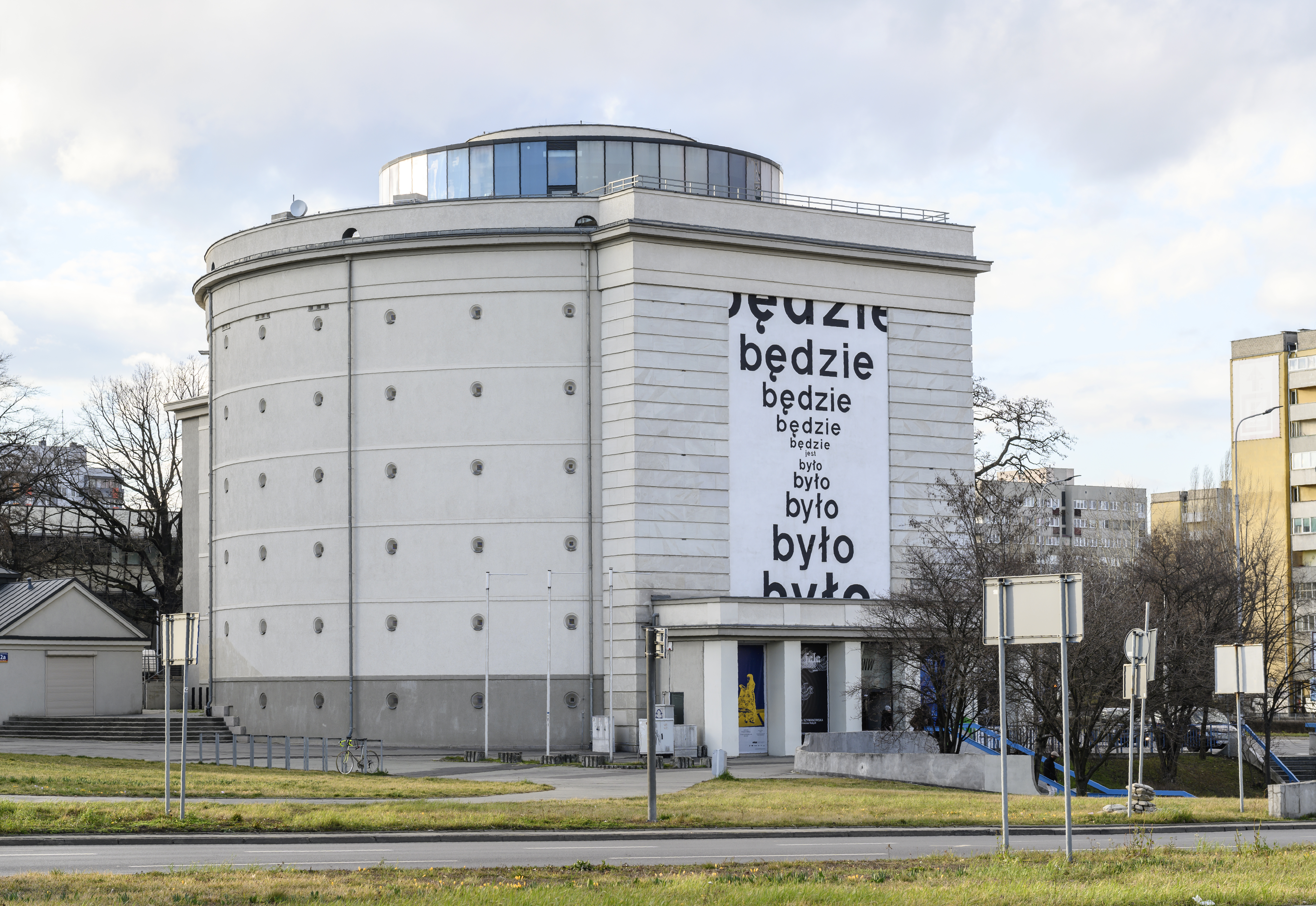
- Wrocław Contemporary Museum
- Established: 2011
- Location: pl. Strzegomski 2a 53-681 Wrocław
- Director: dr Sylwia Świsłocka-Karwot
- Website: muzeumwspolczesne.pl

Wrocław Contemporary Museum (Polish: Muzeum Współczene Wrocław; MWW), is a museum located in Wrocław, Poland. It was established in 2011. It develops relations with contemporary artists by exhibitions and educational events, while expanding its art collection.

== Exhibitions ==
The museum's exhibition program focuses on promoting and popularizing local, progressive and recent phenomena of contemporary art. Its collection in 2019 amounted to 318 objects by Polish and foreign artists. Its concept is based on the legacy of Jerzy Ludwiński, and his combination of conceptual art practice and social debate.

== Headquarters ==
The air-raid shelter on Strzegom Square in Wrocław was originally intended as a temporary home for the Museum. It is the largest of the five air-raid shelters built in Breslau in the 1940s, designed by Richard Konwiarz, the German architect who designed Berlin Olympic Stadium. It is a six-storey building of reinforced concrete. Its outer walls are over one meter thick, and the ceiling is one and a half meters thick. The German architect's shelters referred to the imperial style and to Napoleonic architecture, probably deliberately so as not to betray their function.

== Sources ==
- "Wroclaw Contemporary Museum (MWW): Public Institution". artfacts.net. Artfacts.
- Co się stało z naszą pracą, gdzie jest nasze wolne – wystawa „Stosunki pracy”. Karol Sienkiewicz. („Gazeta Wyborcza”, 13.06.2016) (in Polish)
- Nie ma ale będzie. Karol Sienkiewicz. („Dwutygodnik”, nr. 65, 2011)
- Różne poziomy powagi. Kilka pytań do Doroty Monkiewicz z okazji otwarcia Muzeum Współczesnego. Marcin Krasny. („Obieg”, 01.09.2011) (in Polish)
- W stronę apolityczności. Rozmowa z Andrzejem Jaroszem („Szum”, 24.02.2017) (in Polish)
