= Gajków =

- Village
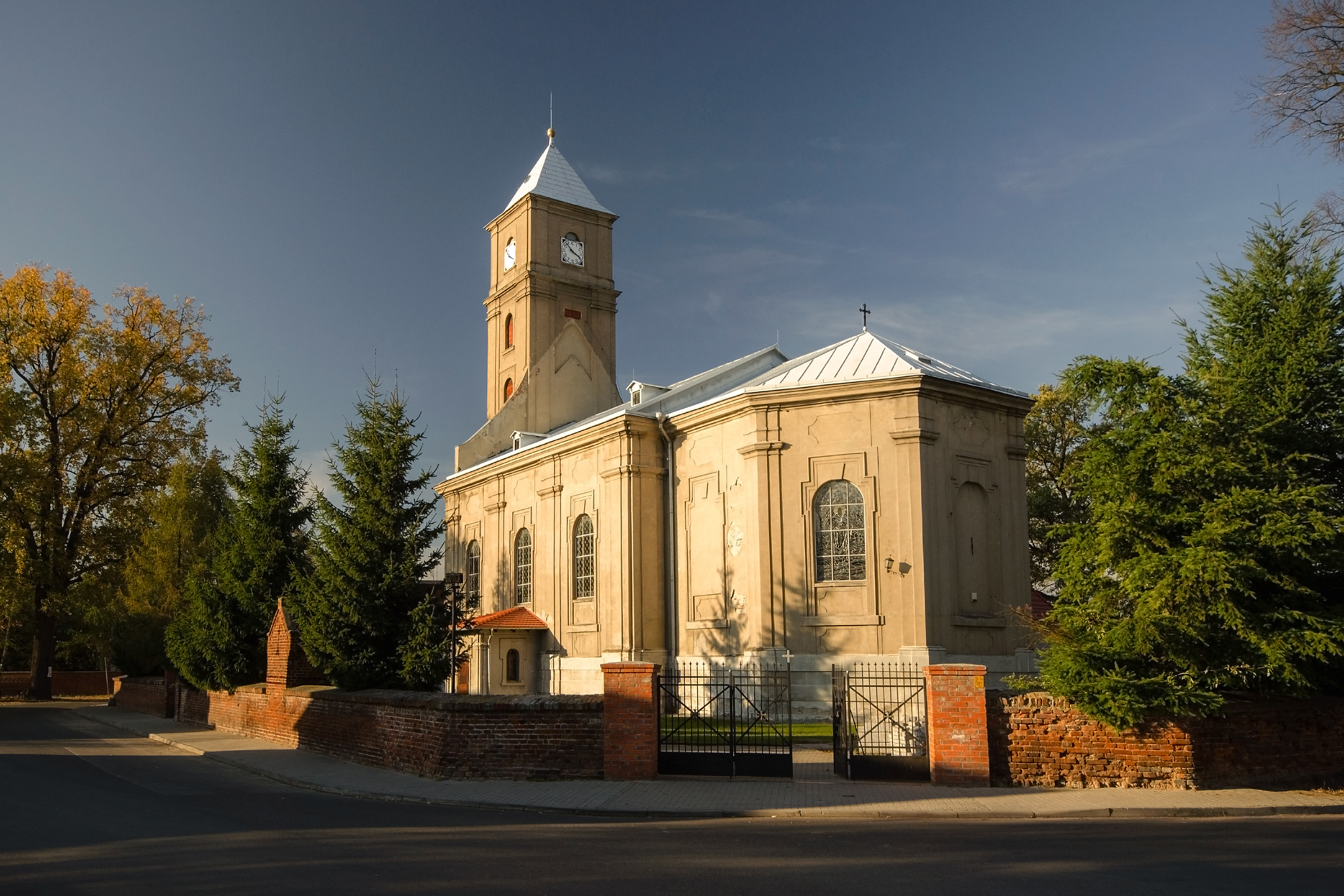
- Church of Saint Margaret

- Location within Poland
- Coordinates: 51°03′28″N 17°11′27″E
- Country: Poland
- Voivodeship: Lower Silesian
- County: Wrocław
- Gmina: Czernica

Gajków [ˈɡai̯kuf] is a village in the administrative district of Gmina Czernica, within Wrocław County, Lower Silesian Voivodeship, in south-western Poland.
