= Silesian Insurgents Square =

Square in Wrocław, Poland

Coordinates: 51.090221°N 17.016440°E

- plac Powstańców Śląskich
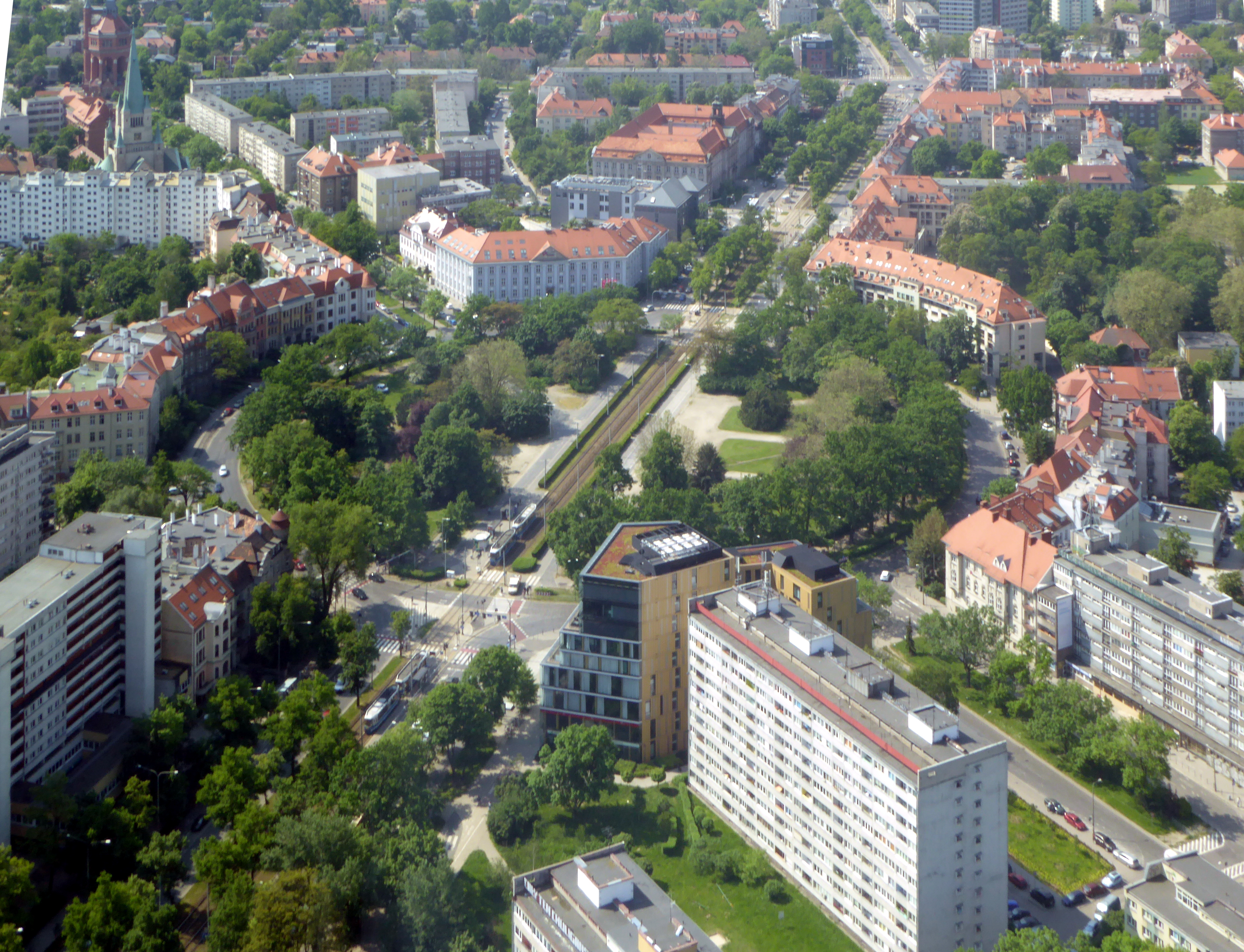
- Length: 220 m (720 ft)
- Location: Wrocław, Lower Silesian Voivodeship, Poland

The Silesian Insurgents Square (Polish: plac Powstańców Śląskich [ˈplat͡s pɔfˈstaj̃t͡suf ˈɕlɔ̃skʲix]), commonly and colloquially referred to as Rondo (Polish: [ˈrɔndɔ], 'The Roundabout'), is a circular square and important transit point in Wrocław, Poland.

The roundabout is situated in the Powstańców Śląskich district and measures approximately 220 meters in diameter. It comprises a three-lane roadway and a green, tree-lined area in the center.

== History ==
The circular square was first proposed in 1880 and eventually built at the end of the 19th century in the Kaiser-Wilhelm-Viertel district, based on designs by Ferdinand Alexandrer Kaumann and August Hoffmann. The central part of the square was originally intended to be a market square, however, it was later repurposed for recreational purposes.

The square was originally named Kaiser-Wilhelm-Platz, after the German emperor William I. It was later renamed after the Reich President (Reichs-Präsident-Platz), and eventually, in 1934, after Paul von Hindenburg (Hindenburgplatz).

Until about 1937, the streetcars passing through the square used the road around it. Only after the reconstruction of today's Silesian Insurgents Street into a two-lane thoroughfare with a streetcar line in the middle, the streetcars were routed through the center of the square.

After the siege of Breslau, the city became a part of Poland, and the square received its modern-day Polish name.
