= Nadolice Wielkie =

- Village
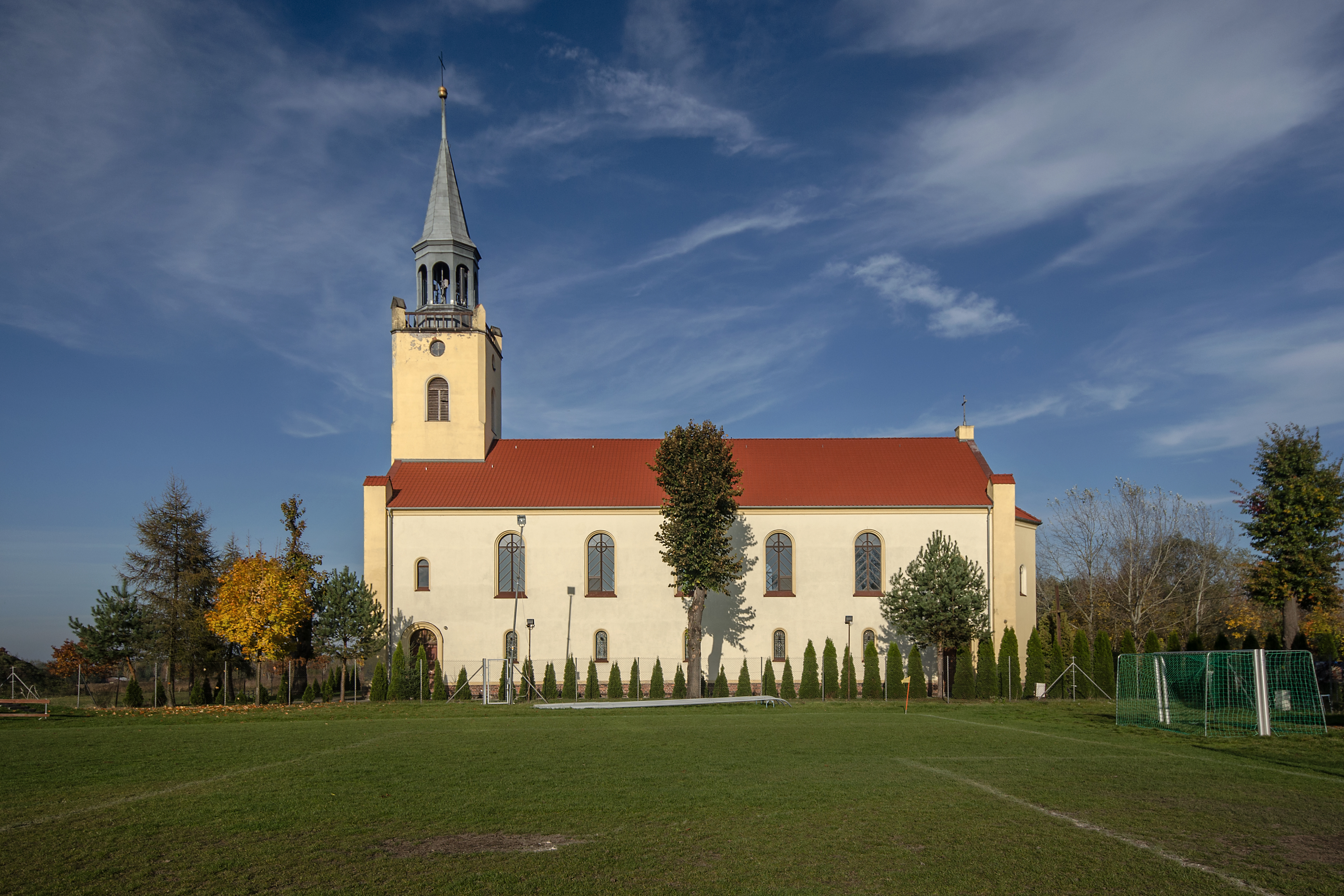
- SM Nadolice Wielkie kościół Matki Bożej Różańcowej

- Location within Poland
- Coordinates: 51°5′N 17°15′E
- Country: Poland
- Voivodeship: Lower Silesian
- County: Wrocław
- Gmina: Czernica

Nadolice Wielkie [nadɔˈlit͡sɛ ˈvjɛlkʲɛ] (German: Groß Nädlitz) is a village in the administrative district of Gmina Czernica, within Wrocław County, Lower Silesian Voivodeship, in south-western Poland.

== Name ==
The first mention of the village is in a Latin document from 1250 issued by Pope Innocent IV in Lyon, where the village was noted in the Latinized form of "Nadlic".

In the Latin book Liber fundationis episcopatus Vratislaviensis (Polish Book of the Bureaucracy of the Wrocław Bishopric), written during the reign of Bishop Henryk z Wierzbnej in 1295–1305, the village is mentioned in the old-style Roman Catholic form Nadliczi.

In the years 1945–1948, the village was called Wysławice, and later changed its name several times.
