= Kamieniec Wrocławski =

- Village
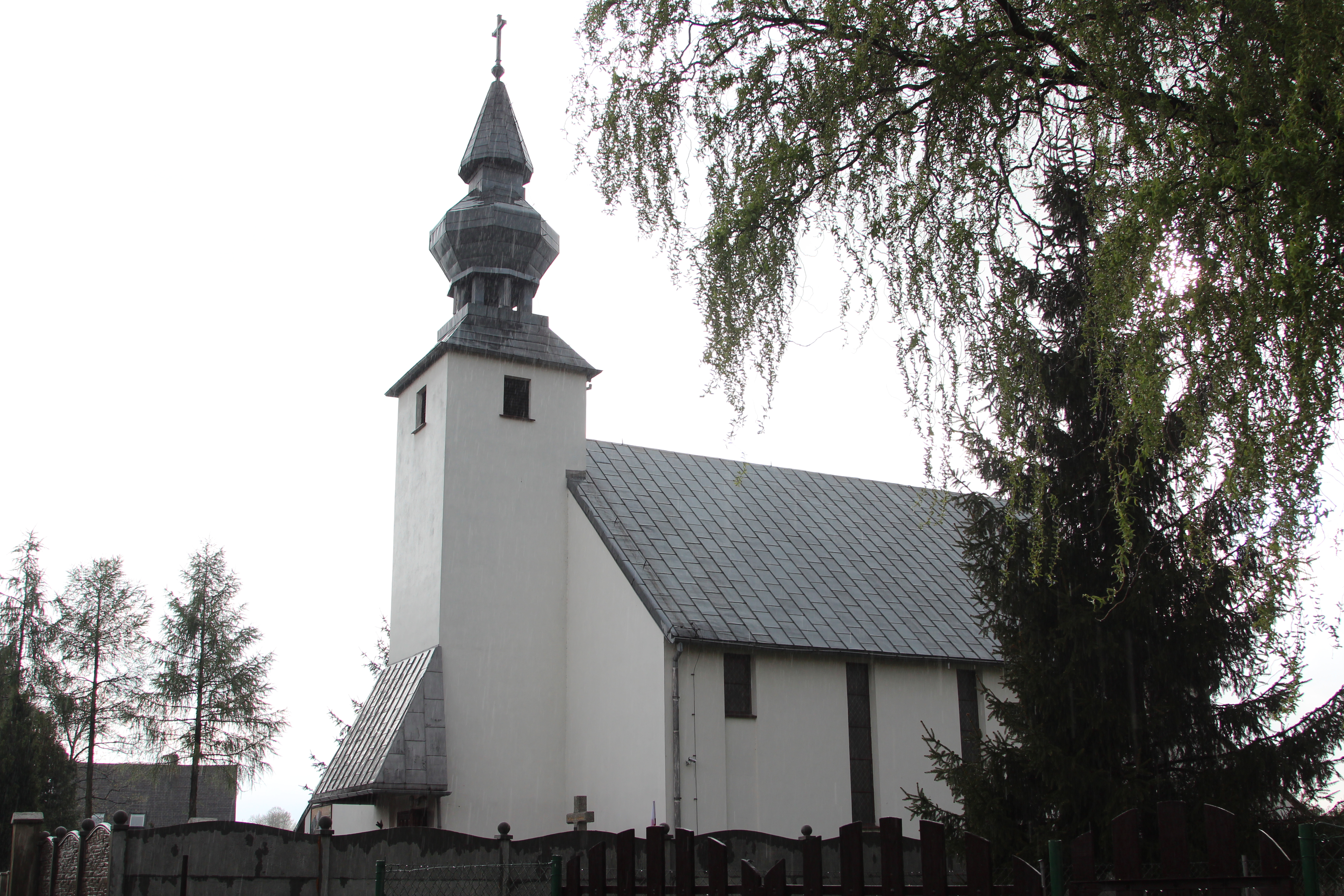
- Church of Divine Mercy in Kamieniec Wrocławski

- Location within Poland
- Coordinates: 51°04′21″N 17°10′44″E
- Country: Poland
- Voivodeship: Lower Silesian
- County: Wrocław
- Gmina: Czernica
- Population (approx.): 2,000
- Time zone: UTC+1 (CET)
  - Summer (DST): UTC+2 (CEST)
- Vehicle registration: DWR

Kamieniec Wrocławski (Polish pronunciation: [kaˈmjɛɲɛd͡z vrɔˈt͡swafskʲi]) is a village in the administrative district of Gmina Czernica, within Wrocław County, Lower Silesian Voivodeship, in south-western Poland.

== History ==
In the early 14th-century Liber fundationis episcopatus Vratislaviensis the village was mentioned under the Latinized form of its Old Polish name - Kamena. It was then part of Piast-ruled Poland.

During World War II, the Germans operated a forced labour subcamp of a Nazi prison in Wrocław in the village. Following Germany's defeat in the war, in 1945, the village became again part of Poland.
