= Dr. Bronisław Turoń Trail Around Wrocław =

Hiking trail encircling Wrocław, Poland

- Length: 141 + 15 km (87.6 + 9.3 mi)
- Location: Lower Silesian Voivodeship, Poland
- Trailheads: Northern section: Uraz; Connector section: Chrząstawa Wielka; Southern section: Zakrzów Kotowice railway station
- Use: Hiking, partially cycling
- Season: All seasons
- Sights: Historical landmarks, churches, castles, palaces

The Dr. Bronisław Turoń Trail Around Wrocław is a 141-km yellow-marked hiking trail, with most sections also suitable for cycling, located in the Silesian Lowlands of Poland. It passes through villages near Wrocław and some of its peripheral districts. The trail, divided into 10 stages, consists of northern and southern sections due to the absence of permanent pedestrian crossings over the Oder river above and below the city at the time of its design. A 14.6-km partially marked connector section links the northern section's end at Chrząstawa Wielka to the southern section's start at Zakrzów Kotowice railway station, passing through the Ratowice Lock. The Wrocław-Fabryczna Branch of the Polish Tourist and Sightseeing Society awards a badge for completing each stage.

== History ==
The concept for a hiking trail around Wrocław was proposed in 1967 by Zbigniew Szkolnicki, a member of the Wrocław Branch of the Polish Tourist and Sightseeing Society. The trail was marked in 1975 by the Skrzaty School Tourism and Sightseeing Club at Primary School No. 46, under the supervision of Maria Balkowska. In 1986, the trail was named in honour of Polish Tourist and Sightseeing Society activist Bronisław Turoń.

== Landmarks ==
The trail features numerous historical sites listed in the National Institute of Cultural Heritage's register:

- Uraz: Uraz Castle, Church of St. Michael the Archangel
- Kotowice: Church of St. Martin
- Widawa: Church of St. Anne
- Pawłowice: Korn Palace
- Pruszowice: Manor
- Domaszczyn: Church of the Exaltation of the Cross, Huntsman's House
- Szczodre: Sibyllenort Palace
- Długołęka: Church of St. Michael the Archangel
- Chrząstawa Wielka: Church of the Immaculate Conception
- Wojnowice: Church of St. Lawrence
- Ratowice: Ratowice Lock
- Święta Katarzyna: Church of St. Catherine
- Biestrzyków: Knights' residential tower
- Ślęza: Ślęza Manor (Topacz Automotive Museum)
- Bielany Wrocławskie: Church of St. Andrew
- Tyniec Mały: Church of the Assumption of Mary
- Jaszkotle: Church of the Ascension
- Skałka: Church of St. Mary Magdalene
- Jerzmanowo: Church of St. Hedwig
- Leśnica: Leśnica Castle, Church of St. Hedwig
- Lutynia: Church of St. Joseph
- Mrozów: Church of the Blessed Virgin Mary Victorious
- Wojnowice: Wojnowice Castle
- Brzezina: Church of Our Lady of the Rosary

== Route ==
The trail encircles Wrocław, spanning three counties: Trzebnica, Wrocław, and Środa. It enters the city's administrative boundaries in two peripheral districts. The division into northern and southern sections results from the lack of permanent pedestrian crossings over the Oder river at the time of its creation.

=== Northern section ===
Distance	Attractions	Location	Trail intersections	Transport
0.0 km	Castle, church	Uraz	Uraz–Kąty Wrocławskie Trail (green); Uraz–Lubiąż Archaeological Trail (blue); Trzebnica Cycling Loop (red)	PKS Wołów bus: Oborniki Śląskie, Wrocław
6.7 km	Church	Kotowice	Trzebnica Cycling Loop (red, from Uraz via different route)	PKS Wołów bus: Oborniki Śląskie, Wrocław
9.4 km	Church	Paniowice	Trzebnica Cycling Loop (red)	PKS Wołów bus: Wołów, Wrocław
12.2 km	Railway	Szewce railway station	Trzebnica Cycling Loop (red, to Strzeszów)	Polregio train: Jelenia Góra, Leszno, Olsztyn, Poznań, Rawicz, Wrocław
14.3 km	Manor, church, railway	Świniary		MPK Wrocław bus: lines 105, 246; Polregio train: Jelenia Góra, Leszno, Olsztyn, Poznań, Rawicz, Wrocław
18.5 km	Fortified site, church	Widawa	Wrocław–Oborniki Śląskie Cycling Trail (green)	MPK Wrocław bus: lines 308, 908
20.5 km		Krzyżanowice	Wrocław–Trzebnica Cycling Trail (green)	MPK Wrocław bus: line 130
26.8 km	Manor, park, natural monument, railway	Pawłowice	Baltic–Adriatic (from Trzebnica)	MPK Wrocław bus: line 130
28.0 km	Railway	Zakrzów	Baltic–Adriatic (to Wrocław centre)	MPK Wrocław bus: line 128
31.9 km	Church, manor	Pruszowice		Sevibus Wrocław bus: line 934
34.6 km	Church, manor	Domaszczyn		Sevibus bus: lines 914, 934
37.2 km	Manor, natural monument	Szczodre	Długołęka–Krotoszyn Trail (green, from Łozina)	Sevibus bus: lines 904, 914, 914a
38.9 km	Church, railway	Długołęka	Długołęka–Krotoszyn Trail (green)	Sevibus bus: lines 904, 914, 914a Polregio train: Kluczbork, Krotoszyn, Lubliniec, Łódź Kaliska, Oleśnica, Ostrów Wielkopolski, Wrocław
41.7 km	Manor	Kamień		Sevibus bus: lines 914, 914a, 944
47.0 km	Chapel	Raków		Sevibus bus: lines 914a, 921, 944
49.5 km		Oleśniczka		Sevibus bus: line 921
61.6 km	Church	Chrząstawa Wielka		Sevibus bus: line 845

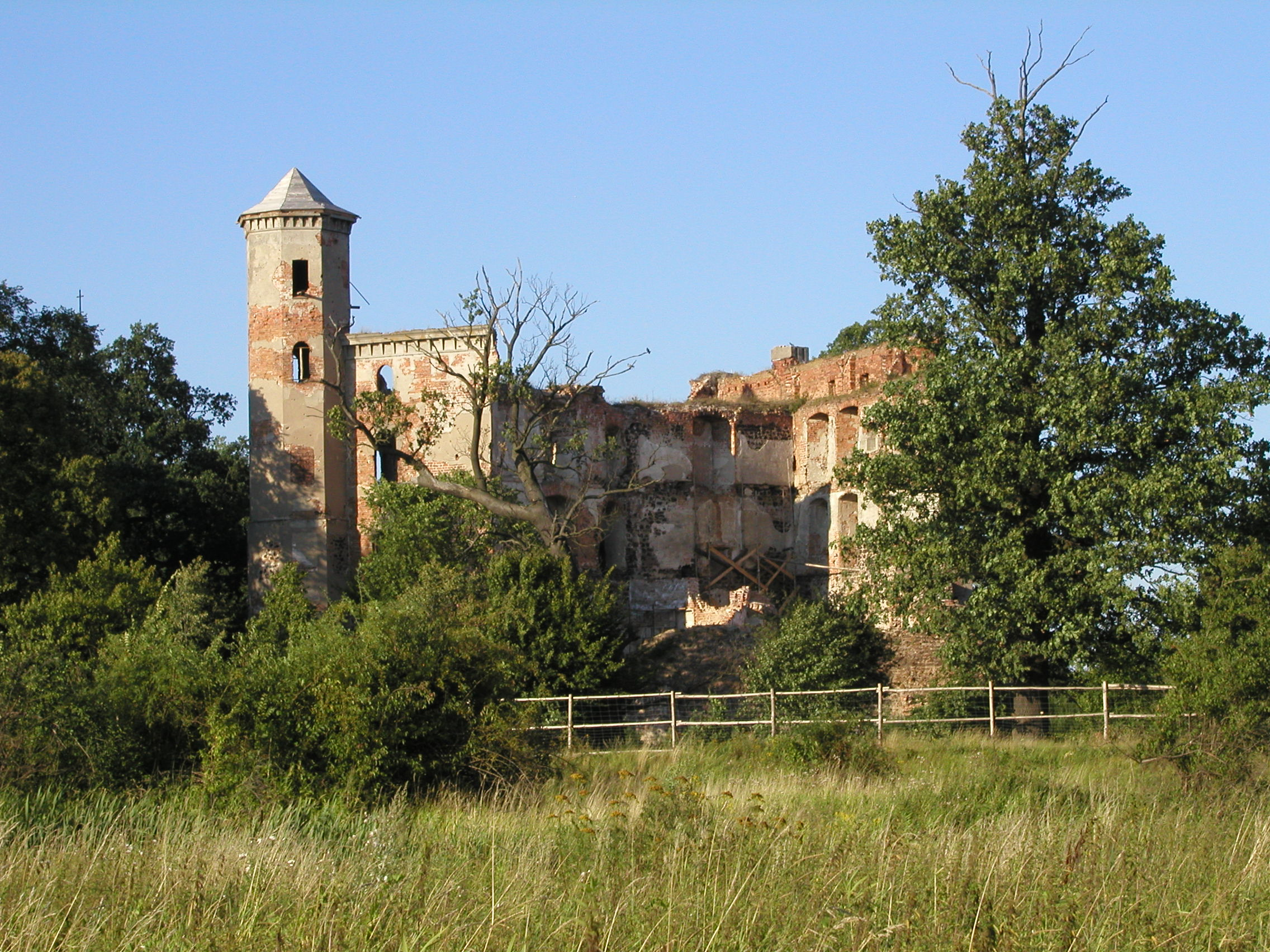
Ruins of the triangular Uraz Castle

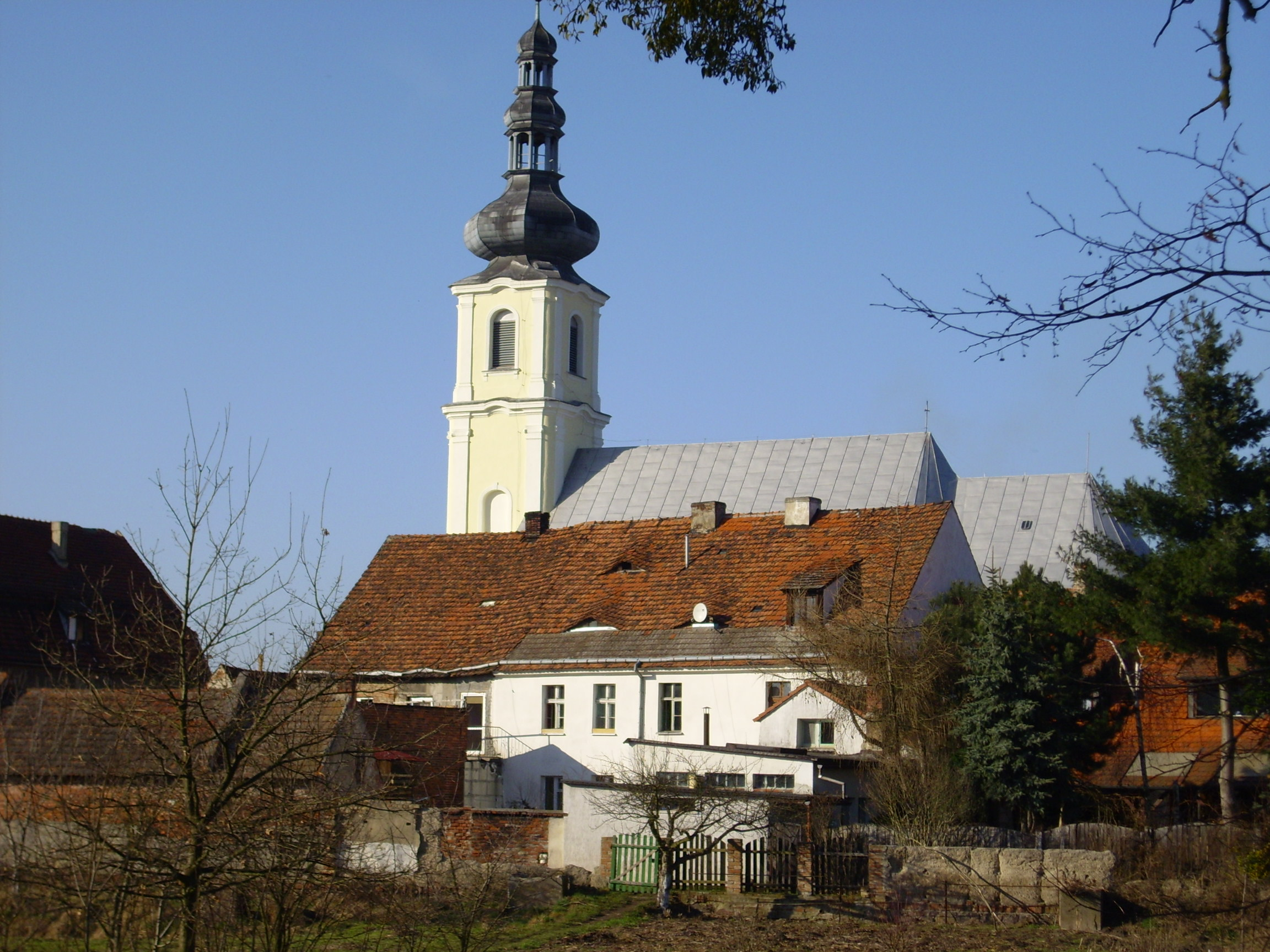
Church of St. Michael the Archangel in Uraz at the trail's start

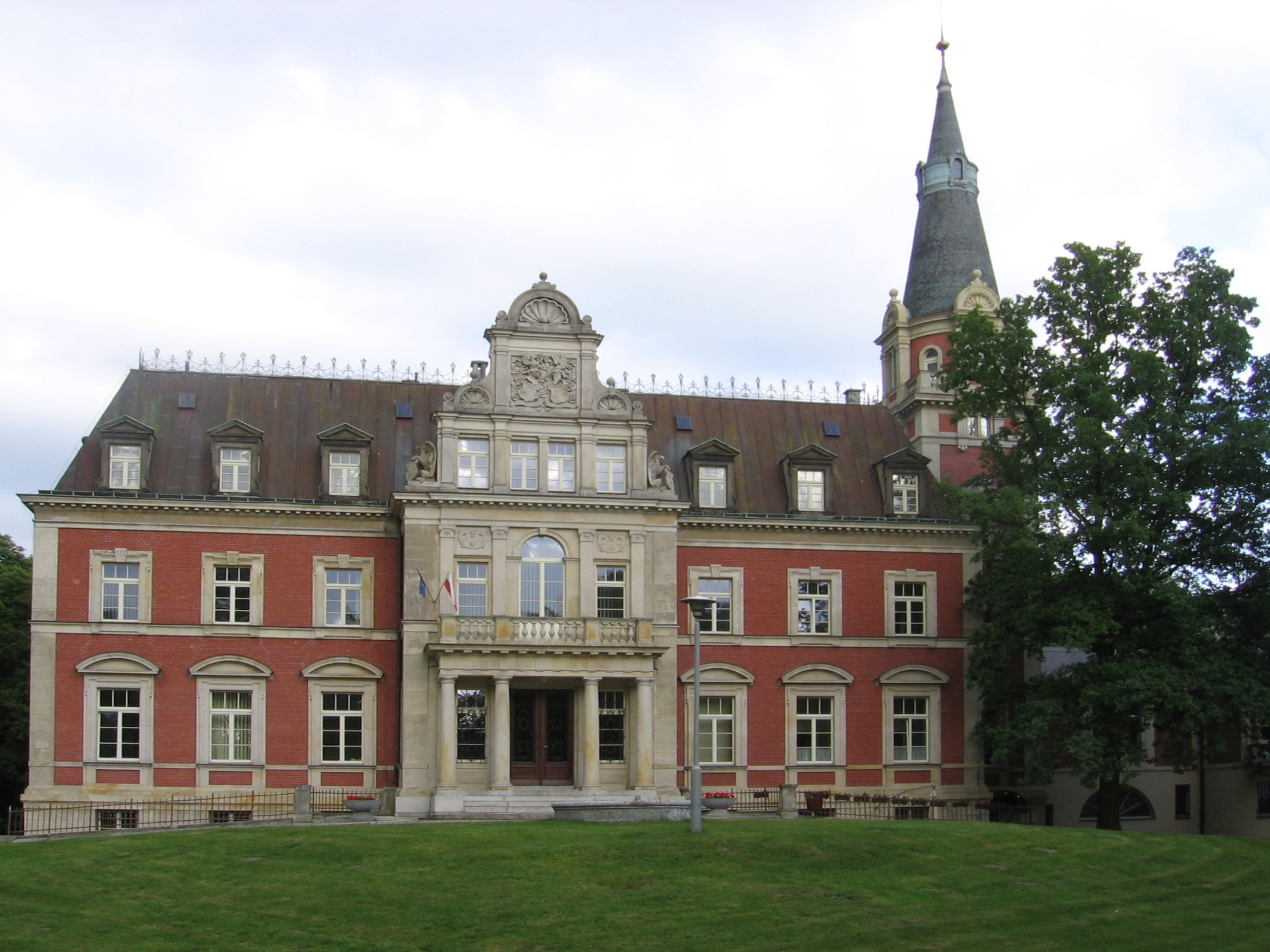
Korn Palace, later von Schweinichen, in Pawłowice

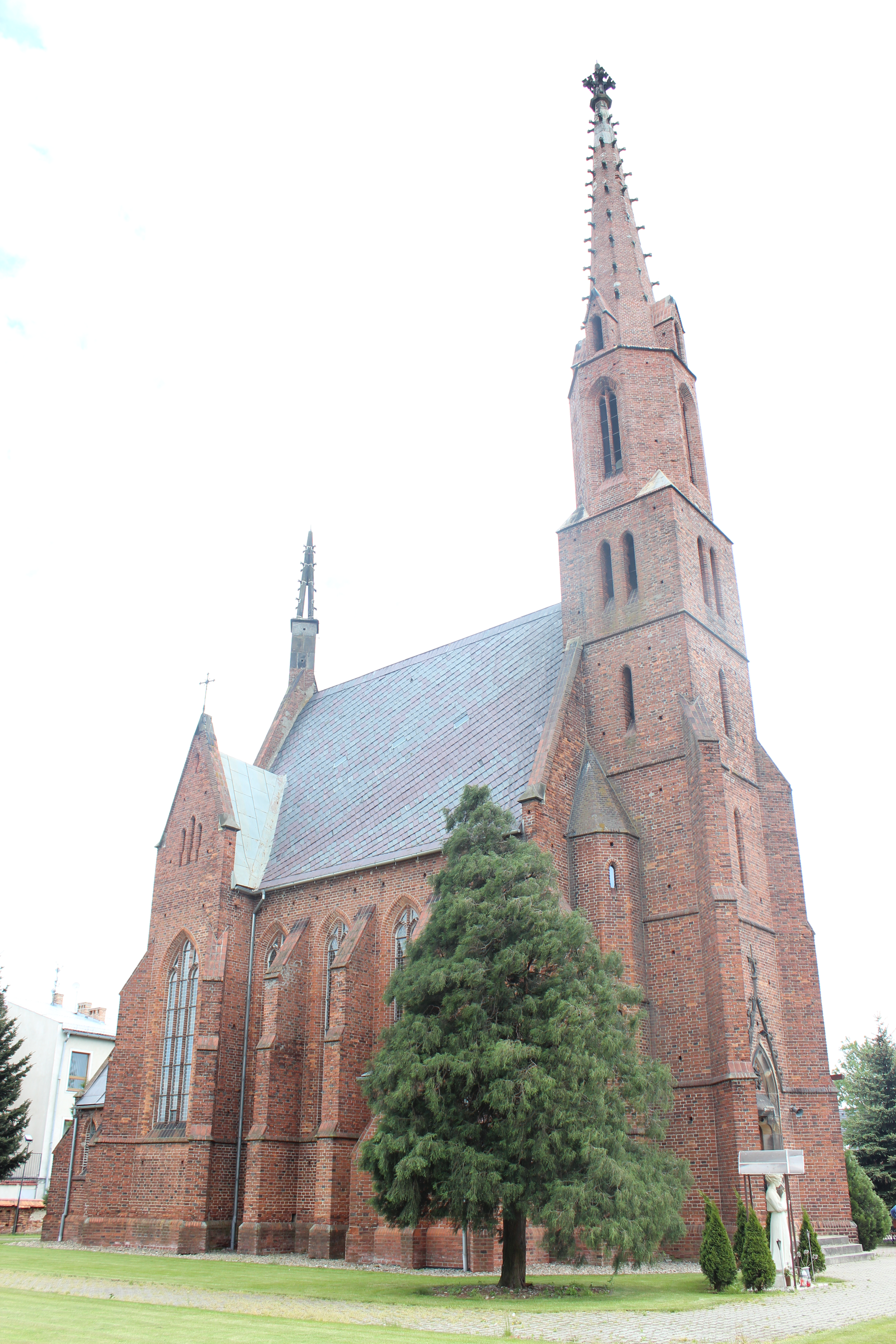
Church of the Immaculate Conception in Chrząstawa Wielka

The northern section loops around Wrocław's north and east, primarily through undeveloped areas (along the embankments of the Oder and Widawa rivers, and later between ponds near Raków), and is partially inaccessible to cyclists.

The National Institute of Cultural Heritage's register lists the following sites along this section:

- Uraz – a 13th-century castellan seat, a town from 1288 to 1945, destroyed in 1945, now a village.
  - Uraz Castle – built after 1319 on a small elevation above the Oder, a typical lowland castle. Originally two storeys, constructed on a triangular plan with a hall featuring cross-vaulting supported by a single pillar; a tower was added in 1630. Rebuilt in the 19th century, destroyed in 1945, and collapsed in the 1950s. Now in ruins, privately owned, fenced, under reconstruction, and open to visitors by arrangement with the owner.
  - Church of St. Michael the Archangel – Baroque, oriented, single-nave, with a distinct chancel and a square western tower. The interior includes items brought by repatriates from Navariia in 1945: a 16th-century painting of Our Lady with Child funded by Mikołaj Herburt Odnowski for Lviv Cathedral, a collection of Rococo Lviv sculptures (including four cardinal virtues, four evangelists, a crucifix, and a processional banner), and a reliquary of St. Valentine.
- Kotowice – a linear settlement mentioned in 1203, with a 14th-century knightly estate referred to as a castle in a 1358 document, no longer extant.
  - Church of St. Martin – Gothic Revival, repeatedly damaged by fires (1832, 1931, 1978), with the current structure from 1911. Its historic furnishings were destroyed in a fire on 1 January 1978, when the Wrocław fire brigade mistakenly responded to another Kotowice.
- Widawa – a Wrocław district since 1973, previously a village, first mentioned in 1193.
  - Church of St. Anne – early Classicist with Gothic origins and Baroque interior. It features three Baroque altars, wooden sculptures from 1760 of St. James the Apostle and St. John Nepomuk, a Mannerist pulpit, a Gothic sandstone alms box with a St. Catherine relief, and Rococo confessionals. Outside, an 18th-century statue of St. John Nepomuk.
- Pawłowice – a Wrocław district since 1970, previously a village, first mentioned in 1245.
  - Korn Palace – originally a farmstead of St. Vincent's Monastery in Wrocław, acquired by Henryk Korn in 1891 and converted into a family seat. The palace's facade retains the coats of arms of Heinrich von Korn and Helena von Eichborn. Surrounding it is a 7.2-ha park with a 0.4-ha pond, an arched stone bridge, and a gloriette. The palace and park are now owned by the Wrocław University of Environmental and Life Sciences.
- Pruszowice – a linear settlement, mentioned in the 14th century as owned by Hans von Graffon.
  - Manor – an early 18th-century half-timbered structure, currently partially extant and in poor condition.
- Domaszczyn – formerly a linear settlement, now with a blurred layout, mentioned in 1250; parts belonged to the ducal estate in Szczodre until 1945.
  - Huntsman's House – a 19th-century Gothic Revival hunting lodge in English style, surrounded by a well-kept manor park with an oak natural monument. Privately owned, not open to visitors.
  - Church of the Exaltation of the Cross – late Gothic, oriented, single-nave, with a c. 1520 Gothic sculpture of St. Anne.
- Szczodre – a village formed from two settlements, Raztelwitz (13th century) and Neudorf (1516).
  - Former Swedish consulate building – a quarantine centre and epidemic hospital during the 1963 Wrocław smallpox epidemic, located in the former Swedish consulate. Now a men's shelter operated by the Brother Albert Aid Society.
  - Sibyllenort Palace – built from 1685 to 1692, dubbed "Silesian Windsor", where Albert and Frederick Augustus III died. Abandoned in 1932, burned in 1945, and dismantled in the 1950s. Two outbuildings from between 1851 and 1867, a 642-cm oak natural monument, a 9.75-ha palace park, and a 120-ha landscape-botanical garden remain. The outbuildings are privately owned and not open to visitors, while the garden serves as a village park.
- Długołęka – a municipal village, mentioned in 1305, a pilgrimage destination since 1454 for Silesia, Bohemia, and Poland.
  - Church of St. Michael the Archangel – Baroque, oriented, single-nave. It houses a painting and pulpit with a relief commemorating a Polish noble's discovery of a host, linked to tragic events in 1453 involving the execution of a peasant and dozens of Wrocław Jews accused of host desecration.
- Chrząstawa Wielka – a multi-road village, mentioned in 1327, owned by Henry Probus and Henry V.
  - Church of the Immaculate Conception – Gothic Revival, single-nave, designed by Alexis Langer. The main altar features paintings of Our Lady Immaculate, St. Hedwig of Silesia, and St. Bernard; a side altar includes paintings of St. John Nepomuk and St. Philomena by Ferdinand Winter, c. 1864.

=== Connector section ===
Distance	Attractions	Location	Trail intersections	Notes	Transport
0.0 km	Castle, church	Chrząstawa Wielka		Yellow-marked section	Sevibus Wrocław bus: line 845
3.0 km	Church, chapel, manor	Wojnowice		Yellow-marked section	Sevibus bus: line 855
6.8 km	Chapel, fortified site	Czernica		Yellow-marked section	Sevibus bus: line 855; Polregio train: Jelcz-Laskowice, Wrocław
10.3 km	Church, technical monument	Ratowice		Unmarked	Sevibus bus: line 855
12.5 km	Church, viewpoint	Kotowice	Oder Cycling Trail (blue)	Unmarked	PKS Wrocław bus: Wrocław; PKS Oława bus: Oława, Wrocław
14.6 km	Railway	Zakrzów Kotowice railway station		Unmarked	Polregio train: Jelcz-Laskowice, Wrocław

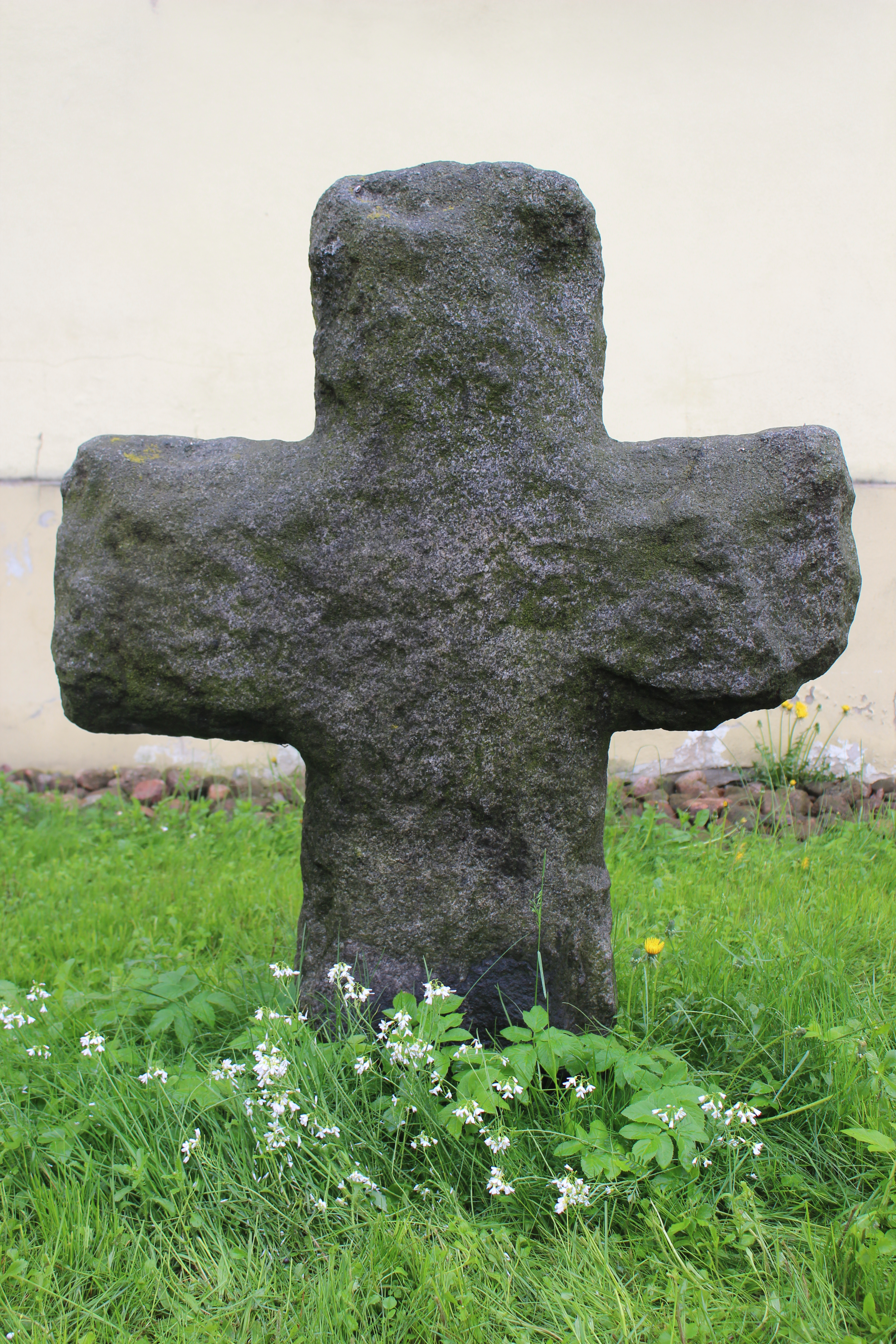
Stone cross in Wojnowice

The National Institute of Cultural Heritage's register lists the following sites along this section:

- Wojnowice – a village mentioned in 1286, granted German law status in 1341, inhabited in 1826 by 18 Polish and one German family.
  - Church of St. Lawrence – Gothic Revival, a deanery sanctuary. It houses an 1804 painting of The Martyrdom of St. Lawrence by Karl Sigismund and St. Lawrence's relics installed in 1999. Outside, a likely late-medieval granite stone cross, often misidentified as a conciliation cross, though no evidence supports this. The assumption that all old monolithic stone crosses are penitential lacks substantiation, as their origins could vary. This hypothesis has become popular but is often presented without noting its speculative nature.
- Ratowice – a village mentioned in 1245, awarded in 1444 to Konrad IV the Elder as compensation for renouncing his bishopric.
  - Ratowice Lock – a lock, weir, control building, and masonry-steel road bridge built in 1906 after the 1903 flood, with a lockkeeper's house added in 1909. Repaired after the 1997 Central European flood.
- Kotowice – a village mentioned in 1208, site of the 6 December 1972 discovery of the Kotowice treasure, comprising at least 1,090 coins and 300 silver ornaments.
  - Oxbow lakes, where snowdrops bloom in spring.
  - A 40-m viewing tower opened in 2012.

=== Southern section ===
Distance	Attractions	Location	Trail intersections	Transport
0.0 km	Railway	Zakrzów Kotowice railway station	Oder Cycling Trail (blue, from Oława)	Polregio train: Jelcz-Laskowice, Wrocław; Lower Silesian Railways train: Jelcz-Laskowice, Wrocław
7.6 km	Railway, place of worship	Siechnice	Via Regia; Oder Cycling Trail (blue, to Wrocław centre)	Sevibus Wrocław bus: lines 900P, 900L, 901; Polregio train: Jelcz-Laskowice, Wrocław; Lower Silesian Railways train: Jelcz-Laskowice, Wrocław
9.9 km	Church, chapel, park, manor	Święta Katarzyna		Sevibus bus: lines 900P, 900L, 901
12.9 km	Railway	Smardzów		Sevibus bus: lines 900P, 900L, 910
14.3 km	Church, park, manor	Żerniki Wrocławskie		Sevibus bus: lines 900P, 900L, 901; Lower Silesian Railways train: Jelcz-Laskowice, Legnica, Węgliniec, Wrocław, Zgorzelec
17.2 km	Monument	Biestrzyków		PKS Oława bus: Strzelin, Wrocław; Trako bus: Kąty Wrocławskie, Wrocław
18.7 km	Monument	Wysoka		PKS Oława bus: Strzelin, Wrocław; Trako bus: Wrocław; MPK Wrocław bus: line 612
22.6 km	Castle, museum, hotel	Ślęza		MPK Wrocław bus: line 612
24.6 km	Church, park, manor, tree, fortified site, monument, natural monument	Bielany Wrocławskie		BUSPOL bus: Sobótka, Wrocław; Usługi autokarowe M.Romańczuk bus: Bielawa, Dzierżoniów, Wrocław; PKS Świdnica bus: Świdnica, Wrocław; MPK Wrocław bus: line 612
30.7 km	Church, park, chapel, natural monument	Tyniec Mały		PKS Wrocław bus: Sobótka, Wrocław; BUSPOL bus: Sobótka, Wrocław; PKS Kamienna Góra bus: Kamienna Góra, Wrocław
33.3 km	Park, manor, natural monument	Biskupice Podgórne		Anita Przewozy Osobowe bus: Kąty Wrocławskie, Wrocław; MPK Wrocław bus: lines 602, 607
37.5 km	Church	Jaszkotle		PKS Wrocław bus: Kąty Wrocławskie, Środa Śląska, Wrocław
39.8 km	Railway, church, ruins	Smolec	Muchobór Wielki–Sobótka Trail (blue)	Trako bus: Kąty Wrocławskie, Wrocław; Polregio train: Jelenia Góra, Wałbrzych, Wrocław
42.8 km	Manor	Kębłowice	Baltic–Adriatic (from Wrocław centre)	Trako bus: Kąty Wrocławskie, Wrocław; KRUK bus: Udanin, Wrocław; MPK Wrocław bus: line 909
44.1 km	Church, monument	Skałka	Baltic–Adriatic (to Kąty Wrocławskie)	Trako bus: Kąty Wrocławskie, Wrocław
45.3 km	Park, manor	Samotwór	Uraz–Kąty Wrocławskie Trail (green, from Kąty Wrocławskie)	MPK Wrocław bus: line 909
48.6 km	Church	Jerzmanowo	Uraz–Kąty Wrocławskie Trail (green, to Leśnica via different route)	MPK Wrocław bus: lines 109, 249, 909
51.2 km	Fortified site, park, natural monument	Złotniki		MPK Wrocław bus: lines 109, 129, 909
53.9 km	Church, park, castle, monument, railway	Leśnica	Oder Cycling Trail (blue); Uraz–Kąty Wrocławskie Trail (green)	MPK Wrocław bus: line 148, trams 10, 20, 3
60.4 km	Church, monument, place of worship	Lutynia		Trako bus: Bogdaszowice, Wrocław; PKS Wrocław bus: Środa Śląska, Wrocław
63.8 km	Church, manor	Błonie		PKS Lubin bus: Środa Śląska, Wrocław; PKS Wrocław bus: Środa Śląska, Wrocław; Tarnowscy Komunikacja Międzymiastowa bus: Lubin, Wrocław
68.6 km	Church	Miękinia		PKS Wrocław bus: Środa Śląska, Mrozów; Lower Silesian Railways train: Jelcz-Laskowice, Legnica, Węgliniec, Wrocław, Zgorzelec
72.9 km	Church, place of worship, park, manor, fortified site	Mrozów		PKS Wrocław bus: Środa Śląska; Lower Silesian Railways train: Jelcz-Laskowice, Legnica, Węgliniec, Wrocław, Zgorzelec; Polregio train: Legnica, Wrocław
74.8 km	Park, castle	Wojnowice	Oder–Barycz Cycling Trail (red); Uraz–Kąty Wrocławskie Trail (green); Via Regia	PKS Wrocław bus: Mrozów, Środa Śląska
77.5 km	Church, ruins	Brzezina	Oder–Barycz Cycling Trail (red, from Wojnowice via different route)	MPK Wrocław bus: lines 917, 923
79.0 km	Church	Brzezinka Średzka	Oder Cycling Trail (blue); Oder–Barycz Cycling Trail (red, to Brzeg Dolny)	PKS Wrocław bus: Lenartowice, Miękinia, Wilkszyn; Polregio train: Głogów, Ścinawa, Wołów, Wrocław, Zielona Góra

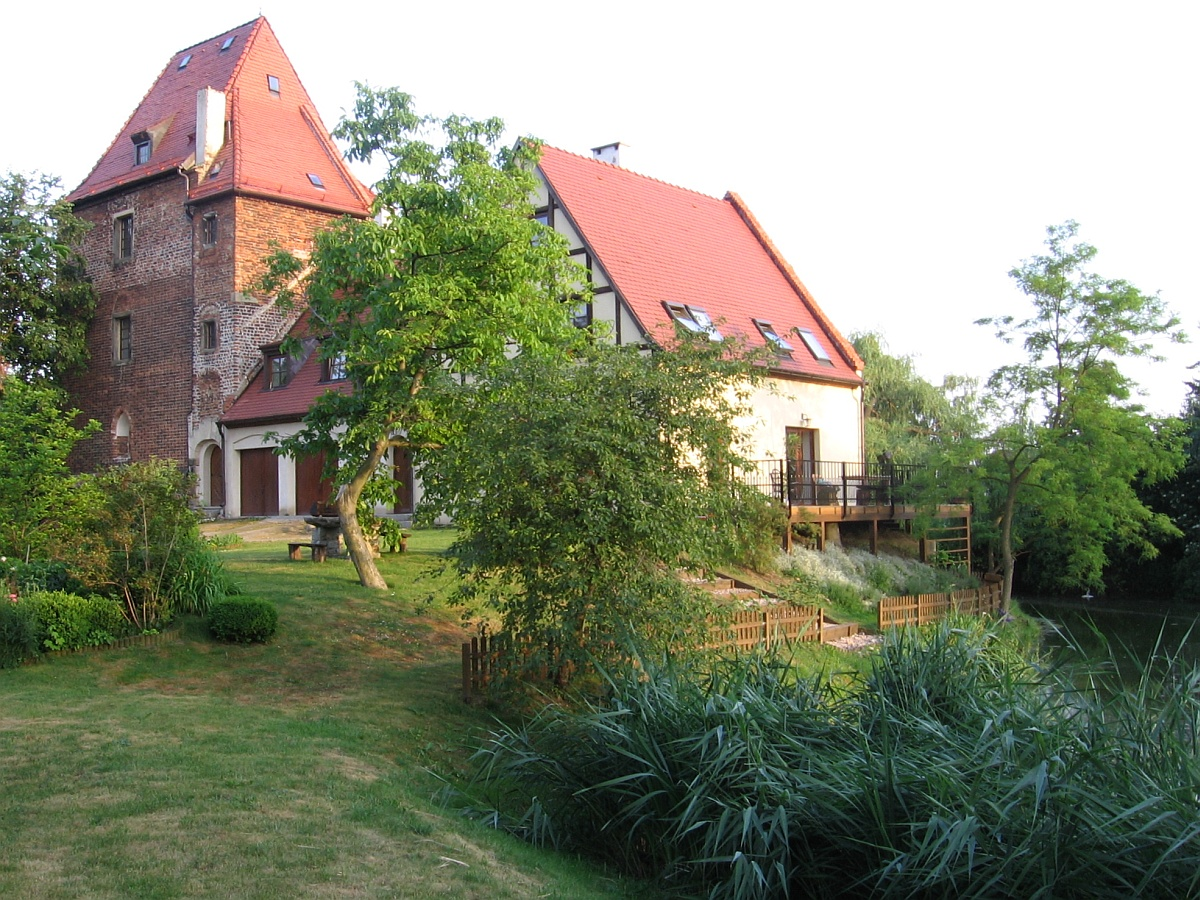
Knights' residential tower in Biestrzyków

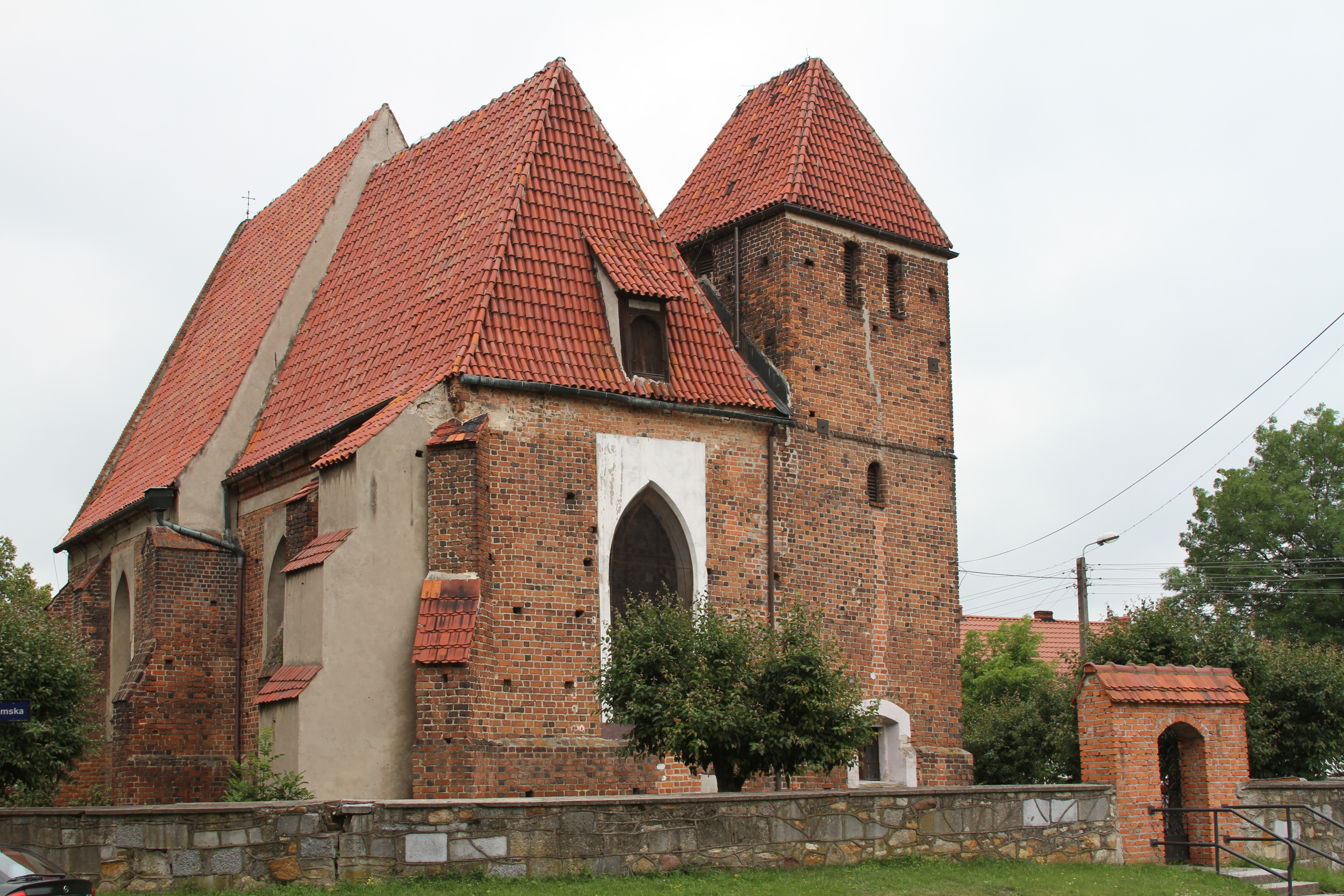
Church of the Assumption in Tyniec Mały

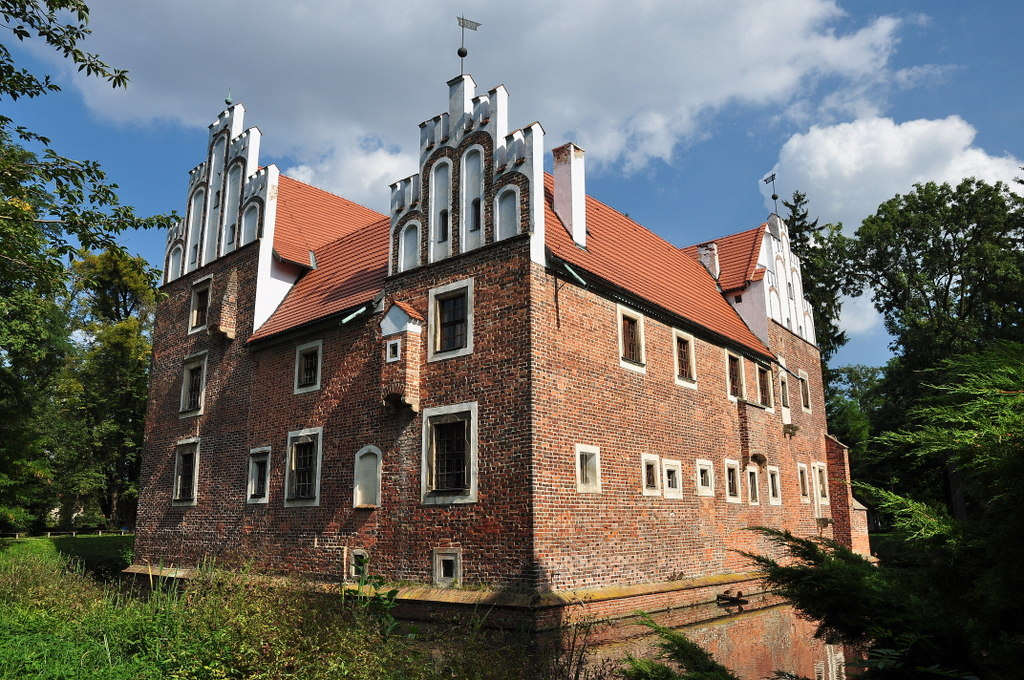
Gothic-Renaissance moated Wojnowice Castle

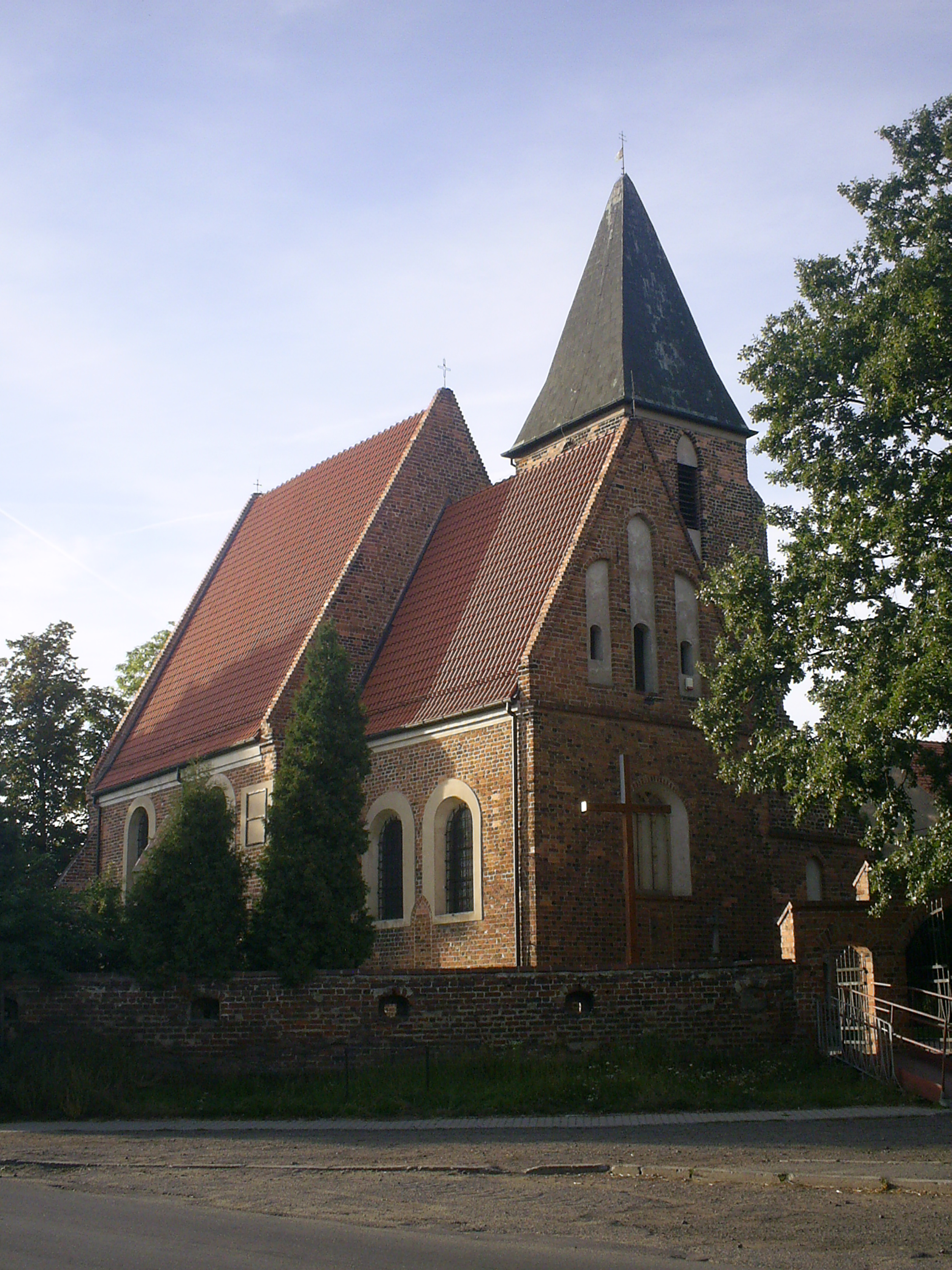
Church of the Ascension in Jaszkotle

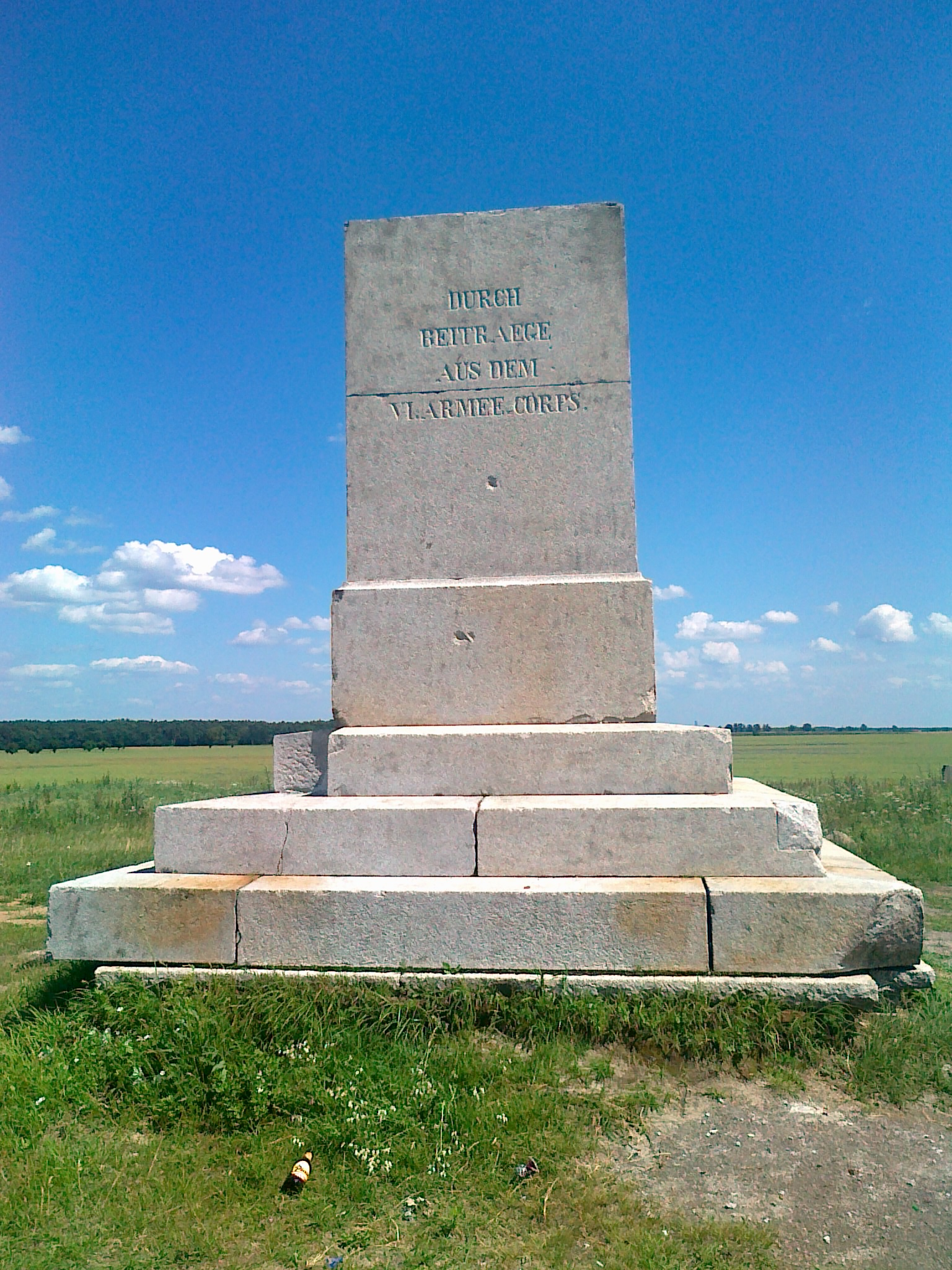
Monument to the Battle of Lutynia in Lutynia

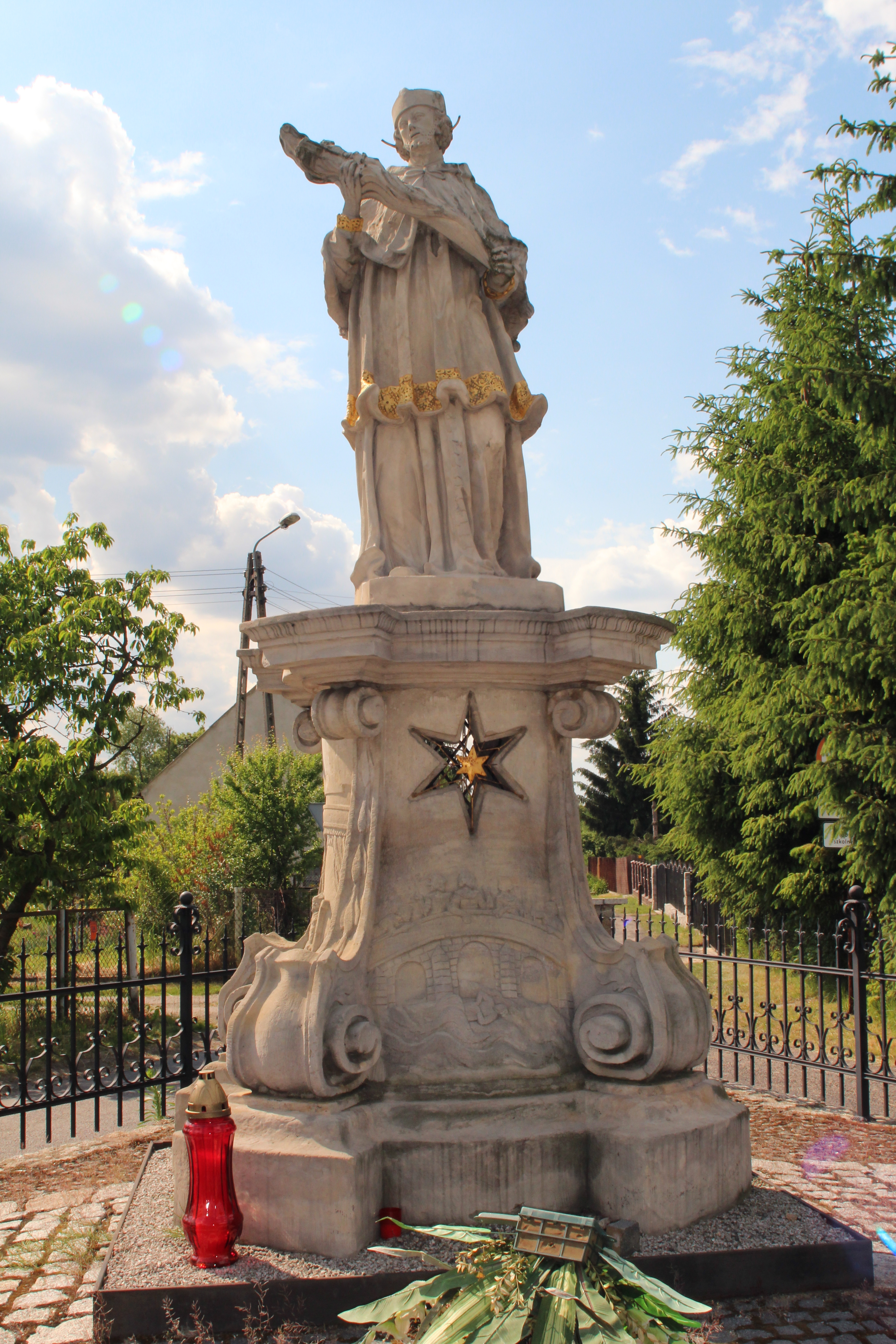
Statue of St. John Nepomuk in Mrozów

The National Institute of Cultural Heritage's register lists the following sites along this section:

- Święta Katarzyna – a multi-road village mentioned in 1257, named after its patron saint's church.
  - Church of St. Catherine – late Romanesque, oriented, single-nave, first mentioned in 1257, with a 15th-century tower and sacristy. Damaged in 1945 by German forces, leaving wall remnants and a damaged tower. It houses a copy of the Black Madonna of Częstochowa, brought from Dolyna, and tombstones of Błażej Schari (d. 1502) and a von Reisewitz family member (c. 1500). Outside, a late Gothic sandstone baptismal font. Now a sanctuary of Our Lady of Częstochowa.
- Biestrzyków – a village mentioned in 1234, possibly in 1221 as Petrcz.
  - Knights' residential tower – a defensive residential tower (one of two preserved near Wrocław), first mentioned in 1411, called knightly. Burned in 1945, renovated at the turn of the 21st century into a residence while preserving its historic character, with a pond from a former moat nearby.
- Ślęza – a village mentioned in 1155, located between the Ślęza river and a canal linking the Ślęza and Zielona rivers.
  - Ślęza Manor – a manor-castle with a medieval Gothic tower, Renaissance southern wing, and Baroque northern wing, rebuilt in the 19th and 20th centuries. After renovation, it houses a hotel, restaurant, and the Topacz Automotive Museum, displaying 20th-century cars and motorcycles.
- Bielany Wrocławskie – a linear settlement mentioned in 1336, now a commercial-industrial hub.
  - Church of St. Andrew – late Gothic, oriented, single-nave, 15th-century. The main altar features a c. 1700 painting of The Martyrdom of St. Andrew, with a Gothic sacramentary, fragments of a c. 1400 carved altar, and a c. 1730 Baroque statue of St. John Nepomuk. Outside, a mid-14th-century Gothic portal and a 15th-century granite baptismal font.
- Tyniec Mały – a village mentioned in 1193.
  - Several monumental trees: an oak (340 cm circumference), two white poplars (520 cm, 35 m tall), a yew (110 cm), a drooping beech (235 cm), and a mountain elm (360 cm).
  - Church of the Assumption of Mary – Gothic, oriented, single-nave, from 1516. It contains two c. 1500 Gothic sculptures and a 1516 Gothic sacramentary. Outside, a 15th-century stone pillar chapel.
- Jaszkotle – a multi-road village mentioned in 1155. Until 2024, it was a hamlet of Gądów.
  - Church of the Ascension – Gothic, oriented, single-nave, from 1473. It houses a 15th-century Gothic sculpture of Madonna with Child, a freestanding statue of St. John Nepomuk, a Baroque pulpit with a Jesus relief, and paintings of The Four Evangelists and Crucifixion from the Michael Willmann school.
- Skałka – a linear settlement mentioned in 1250.
  - Church of St. Mary Magdalene – Gothic, oriented, single-nave, from 1426. It contains a 1500 Gothic sandstone baptismal font, an incomplete Baroque glory of St. John Nepomuk (without the saint's figure), a sculpture of Madonna with Child, and oil paintings: Martyrdom of St. Bartholomew, St. Thecla, and Stations of the Cross.
  - St. John Nepomuk statue – a 1730 damaged statue at the junction of Łąkowa and Szkolna streets.
- Jerzmanowo – a Wrocław district since 1973, previously a village, mentioned in 1245.
  - Church of St. Hedwig – Gothic, oriented, single-nave, 14th-century. It features a late 15th/early 16th-century Gothic sacramentary, an 18th-century Baroque altar, six tombstones and epitaphs (two from 1603), and a 1483 bronze bell on the tower.
- Leśnica – a town from 1261 to the 18th century, mentioned in 1201, a Wrocław district since 1928.
  - Leśnica Castle – mentioned in 1271, owned by Wrocław burghers from the 13th century, rebuilt in the 18th century. Converted into a residence in the 19th century, with a park established in 1836. Devastated in 1945, burned in 1953, losing all interior furnishings. Rebuilt, it now houses the Leśnica Cultural Centre. The park, restored to its original design, includes oak natural monuments and bastion fortifications with keyhole embrasures.
  - Church of St. Hedwig – Gothic with Baroque elements, single-nave, from the late 15th century. The ceiling features 1739 paintings by Felix Anton Scheffler, with an 1745–1756 main altar and pulpit, and paintings of Our Lady, St. Hedwig, and St. Matthias. The tower has tracery decoration.
  - Monument to Our Lady and St. John Nepomuk – erected in 1743, with three reliefs depicting St. John Nepomuk's martyrdom (Queen's Confession, Interrogation by the King, and Thrown into the Vltava).
- Lutynia – a Rundling mentioned in 1324.
  - Church of St. Joseph – Gothic, oriented, single-nave, from 1335. It contains a 15th-century stone sacramentary, an 18th-century Pietà, Renaissance stalls, a pulpit, and an early 16th-century statue of St. Anne. Outside, epitaphs of Anna and Jerzy Schelendorf and cannonballs from the Seven Years' War embedded in the walls.
  - Battle of Lutynia Monument – erected in 1907 to commemorate the Seven Years' War battle, now surviving as a granite-block plinth with cannonball damage marks.
- Mrozów – a multi-road village mentioned in 1244.
  - Church of the Blessed Virgin Mary Victorious – Baroque, oriented, single-nave, from 1335, rebuilt in 1684 as a votive offering for the Battle of Vienna victory and Silesia's protection from the Turks. The main altar features a painting of Our Lady Victorious, with sculptures of St. Francis Xavier and St. Francis de Sales, and a late 17th-century pulpit.
  - St. John Nepomuk Monument – Baroque, freestanding, with a plinth relief depicting a reliquary with the saint's tongue and scenes of his confession to Queen Sophia of Bavaria and being thrown into the Vltava.
- Wojnowice – a village mentioned in 1291, named after the medieval name Wojen.
  - Wojnowice Castle – Gothic-Renaissance, moated, rectangular, from 1530, rebuilt in Renaissance style from 1545 to 1560. Abandoned after 1945, secured in 1956, later rebuilt and significantly altered. It features a landscape park, a 19th-century bridge, and a Renaissance portal. Now a hotel and restaurant.
- Brzezina – a village mentioned in 1202.
  - Church of Our Lady of the Rosary – oriented, with a Gothic triptych from the Veit Stoss school, Renaissance pulpit, stalls, baptismal font, and sacramentary, and a late 18th-century Baroque altar. Seven full-figure tombstones are embedded in the church walls.

== Guidebooks ==
The trail has been covered in the following guidebooks:

- Z plecakiem po województwie wrocławskim (Backpacking in Wrocław Voivodeship, 1986, 76 pages, 120x205 mm, by Jerzy Maciejewski) – pages 29–42 provide a brief trail description with basic sightseeing information.
- Na spacerowym szlaku dookoła Wrocławia (On the Walking Trail Around Wrocław, 1991, 120x165 mm, by Jerzy Maciejewski) – describes the trail's route (with schematic stage maps) and provides sightseeing information about villages and Wrocław districts along the trail. Stages align with the "Wanderings Around Wrocław" badge regulations, with the badge rules included at the end.
- Żółty szlak turystyczny dookoła Wrocławia im. dr. Bronisława Turonia: rowerowe trasy dojazdowe: przewodnik (Dr. Bronisław Turoń Yellow Tourist Trail Around Wrocław: Cycling Access Routes: Guide, 2005, 320 pages, 110x205 mm, colour illustrations, edited by Krzysztof Garbaczewski) – details the trail's route (with stage map excerpts), the connector section, and five cycling access routes, making the trail accessible to cyclists. Stages align with the badge regulations, with rules and a confirmation card included.

Since 2005, only maps of the Wrocław area have been published, showing the updated trail route and distances. The latest is the 2012 Wokół Wrocławia (Around Wrocław) map, which includes trail condition and marking information.
