= Kotovo =

Kotovo (Russian: Котово) is the name of several inhabited localities in Russia.

== Belgorod Oblast ==
As of 2010, one rural locality in Belgorod Oblast bears this name:

- Kotovo, Belgorod Oblast, a selo in Starooskolsky District

== Chelyabinsk Oblast ==
As of 2010, one rural locality in Chelyabinsk Oblast bears this name:

- Kotovo, Chelyabinsk Oblast, a settlement in Unkurdinsky Selsoviet of Nyazepetrovsky District

== Ivanovo Oblast ==
As of 2010, three rural localities in Ivanovo Oblast bear this name:

- Kotovo, Furmanovsky District, Ivanovo Oblast, a village in Furmanovsky District
- Kotovo (Ryabovskoye Rural Settlement), Lukhsky District, Ivanovo Oblast, a village in Lukhsky District; municipally, a part of Ryabovskoye Rural Settlement of that district
- Kotovo (Blagoveshchenskoye Rural Settlement), Lukhsky District, Ivanovo Oblast, a village in Lukhsky District; municipally, a part of Blagoveshchenskoye Rural Settlement of that district

== Kaluga Oblast ==
As of 2010, one rural locality in Kaluga Oblast bears this name:

- Kotovo, Kaluga Oblast, a village in Mosalsky District

== Kostroma Oblast ==
As of 2010, two rural localities in Kostroma Oblast bear this name:

- Kotovo, Kostromskoy District, Kostroma Oblast, a village in Kotovskoye Settlement of Kostromskoy District
- Kotovo, Parfenyevsky District, Kostroma Oblast, a village in Parfenyevskoye Settlement of Parfenyevsky District

== Kursk Oblast ==
As of 2010, one rural locality in Kursk Oblast bears this name:

- Kotovo, Kursk Oblast, a selo in Kotovsky Selsoviet of Pristensky District

== Lipetsk Oblast ==
As of 2010, one rural locality in Lipetsk Oblast bears this name:

- Kotovo, Lipetsk Oblast, a village in Gryzlovsky Selsoviet of Dolgorukovsky District

== Moscow Oblast ==
As of 2010, three rural localities in Moscow Oblast bear this name:

- Kotovo (settlement), Luchinskoye Rural Settlement, Istrinsky District, Moscow Oblast, a settlement in Luchinskoye Rural Settlement of Istrinsky District
- Kotovo (village), Luchinskoye Rural Settlement, Istrinsky District, Moscow Oblast, a village in Luchinskoye Rural Settlement of Istrinsky District
- Kotovo, Naro-Fominsky District, Moscow Oblast, a village in Ateptsevskoye Rural Settlement of Naro-Fominsky District

== Novgorod Oblast ==
As of 2010, four rural localities in Novgorod Oblast bear this name:

- Kotovo, Peredskoye Settlement, Borovichsky District, Novgorod Oblast, a village in Peredskoye Settlement of Borovichsky District
- Kotovo, Sushilovskoye Settlement, Borovichsky District, Novgorod Oblast, a village in Sushilovskoye Settlement of Borovichsky District
- Kotovo, Lyubytinsky District, Novgorod Oblast, a village under the administrative jurisdiction of the urban-type settlement of Nebolchi, Lyubytinsky District
- Kotovo, Okulovsky District, Novgorod Oblast, a settlement in Kotovskoye Settlement of Okulovsky District

== Oryol Oblast ==
As of 2010, one rural locality in Oryol Oblast bears this name:

- Kotovo, Oryol Oblast, a village in Kotovsky Selsoviet of Uritsky District

== Pskov Oblast ==
As of 2010, seven rural localities in Pskov Oblast bear this name:

- Kotovo, Bezhanitsky District, Pskov Oblast, a village in Bezhanitsky District
- Kotovo, Dedovichsky District, Pskov Oblast, a village in Dedovichsky District
- Kotovo, Kunyinsky District, Pskov Oblast, a village in Kunyinsky District
- Kotovo, Novorzhevsky District, Pskov Oblast, a village in Novorzhevsky District
- Kotovo, Opochetsky District, Pskov Oblast, a village in Opochetsky District
- Kotovo, Pskovsky District, Pskov Oblast, a village in Pskovsky District
- Kotovo, Pustoshkinsky District, Pskov Oblast, a village in Pustoshkinsky District

== Ryazan Oblast ==
As of 2010, one rural locality in Ryazan Oblast bears this name:

- Kotovo, Ryazan Oblast, a village in Bychkovsky Rural Okrug of Klepikovsky District

== Smolensk Oblast ==
As of 2010, two rural localities in Smolensk Oblast bear this name:

- Kotovo, Monastyrshchinsky District, Smolensk Oblast, a village in Aleksandrovskoye Rural Settlement of Monastyrshchinsky District
- Kotovo, Novoduginsky District, Smolensk Oblast, a village in Novoduginskoye Rural Settlement of Novoduginsky District

== Tver Oblast ==
As of 2010, three rural localities in Tver Oblast bear this name:

- Kotovo, Belsky District, Tver Oblast, a village in Belsky District
- Kotovo, Kalininsky District, Tver Oblast, a village in Kalininsky District
- Kotovo, Zapadnodvinsky District, Tver Oblast, a village in Zapadnodvinsky District

== Udmurt Republic ==
As of 2010, one rural locality in the Udmurt Republic bears this name:

- Kotovo, Udmurt Republic, a village in Pinyazsky Selsoviet of Karakulinsky District

== Volgograd Oblast ==
As of 2010, one urban locality in Volgograd Oblast bears this name:

- Kotovo, Volgograd Oblast, a town in Kotovsky District; administratively incorporated as a town of district significance

== Vologda Oblast ==
As of 2010, four rural localities in Vologda Oblast bear this name:

- Kotovo, Chagodoshchensky District, Vologda Oblast, a village in Lukinsky Selsoviet of Chagodoshchensky District
- Kotovo, Cherepovetsky District, Vologda Oblast, a village in Ivanovsky Selsoviet of Cherepovetsky District
- Kotovo, Sheksninsky District, Vologda Oblast, a village in Lyubomirovsky Selsoviet of Sheksninsky District
- Kotovo, Ustyuzhensky District, Vologda Oblast, a village in Nikiforovsky Selsoviet of Ustyuzhensky District

== Yaroslavl Oblast ==
As of 2010, five rural localities in Yaroslavl Oblast bear this name:

- Kotovo, Gavrilov-Yamsky District, Yaroslavl Oblast, a village in Kuzovkovsky Rural Okrug of Gavrilov-Yamsky District
- Kotovo, Nekouzsky District, Yaroslavl Oblast, a village in Spassky Rural Okrug of Nekouzsky District
- Kotovo, Poshekhonsky District, Yaroslavl Oblast, a village in Kholmovsky Rural Okrug of Poshekhonsky District
- Kotovo, Uglichsky District, Yaroslavl Oblast, a village in Golovinsky Rural Okrug of Uglichsky District
- Kotovo, Yaroslavsky District, Yaroslavl Oblast, a village in Kurbsky Rural Okrug of Yaroslavsky District

== See also ==
- Kotov (disambiguation)
- Kotovsky (disambiguation)
