= Kotovsky (disambiguation) =

Kotovsky is a surname.

Kotovsky (masculine), Kotovskaya (feminine) or Kotovskoye (neuter) may also refer to:

- Kotovsky District, a district of Volgograd Oblast in Russia
- Kotovsky (rural locality) (Kotovskaya, Kotovskoye), several rural localities in Russia
- Kotovsky (film), a 1942 Soviet film
- Kotovskoye, name of Hîncești, Moldova, from 1945 to 1965

== See also ==
- Kotowski (disambiguation)
- Kotovsk (disambiguation)
- Kotov (disambiguation)
- Kotovo
