= EV9 =

EV9 may refer to:

- EV9 The Amber Route, cycling route in Europe
- Kia EV9, all-electric mid-size crossover SUV
