= Kotowski =

Kotowski, pronounced [kɔˈtɔfski], feminine: Kotowska ("Kotowski" is also used as a feminine surname as well) is a surname of Polish origin. It is a toponymic surname derived from any of locations named Kotowice, Kotowo, Kotów. Its variant is Kotoski produced by the phonetic simplification of the consonant cluster -wsk- > -sk-. Notable people with the surname include:

- Adam Kotowski (1626–1693), royal cup-bearer at the court of Polish king Jan Sobieski
- Albert Stefan Kotowski (1949), Polish historian and professor at the University of Bydgoszcz
- Alfons Kotowski (1899–1944), leading member of the Polish Home Army in World War II
- Alicja Kotowska (1899–1939), beatified Polish nun
- Damazy Kotowski (1861–1943), Polish artist of the impressionism
- Dan Kotowski (1967), former senator of the Illinois Senate from the 33rd district
- Konrad Kotowski (1940–2008), German cinematographer and winner of the Locarno film awards
- Konstanty Kotowski (1610–1665), Polish conspirator and leader of the Lithuanian cavalry
- Krzysztof Kotowski (1966), Polish thriller author
- Mariusz Kotowski (1967), Polish film director and producer

== See also ==
- Kotowski Palace, a 17th-century palace in the Polish capitol Warsaw
- Kotovsky (disambiguation)
- Kotowicz
