= Kotovsky =

Kotovsky is a surname of Russian, and Ukrainian origins. The feminine forms are: Kotovskaya (Russian), Kotovska (Ukrainian). The Polish form of the surname: Kotowski/Kotowska. Belarusian: Katowski or Katouski (Катоўскі)

- Grigory Kotovsky (1881–1925), Soviet Red Army commander
- Ludvig Kotovsky (1900–1947), Ukrainian architect
- Olha Kotovska (born 1983), Ukrainian long-distance runner

== See also ==
- Kotowski
