= Kotowice =

Kotowice may refer to:

- Kotowice, Głogów County in Lower Silesian Voivodeship (south-west Poland)
- Kotowice, Trzebnica County in Lower Silesian Voivodeship (south-west Poland)
- Kotowice, Wrocław County in Lower Silesian Voivodeship (south-west Poland)
- Kotowice, Łódź Voivodeship (central Poland)
- Kotowice, Masovian Voivodeship (east-central Poland)
- Kotowice, Silesian Voivodeship (south Poland)
- Kotowice, Lubusz Voivodeship (west Poland)
