= Kotovsk =

Kotovsk is the name of several places named after Grigory Kotovsky. It may refer to:

- Kotovsk, Russia, a town in Tambov Oblast, Russia
- Kotovsk, from 1935 to 2016, name of Podilsk, a town in Ukraine
- Kotovsk, from 1965 to 1990, name of Hîncești, a town in Moldova
