= Pawłowice, Wrocław =

District in Wrocław, Poland

Pawłowice
- District of Wrocław
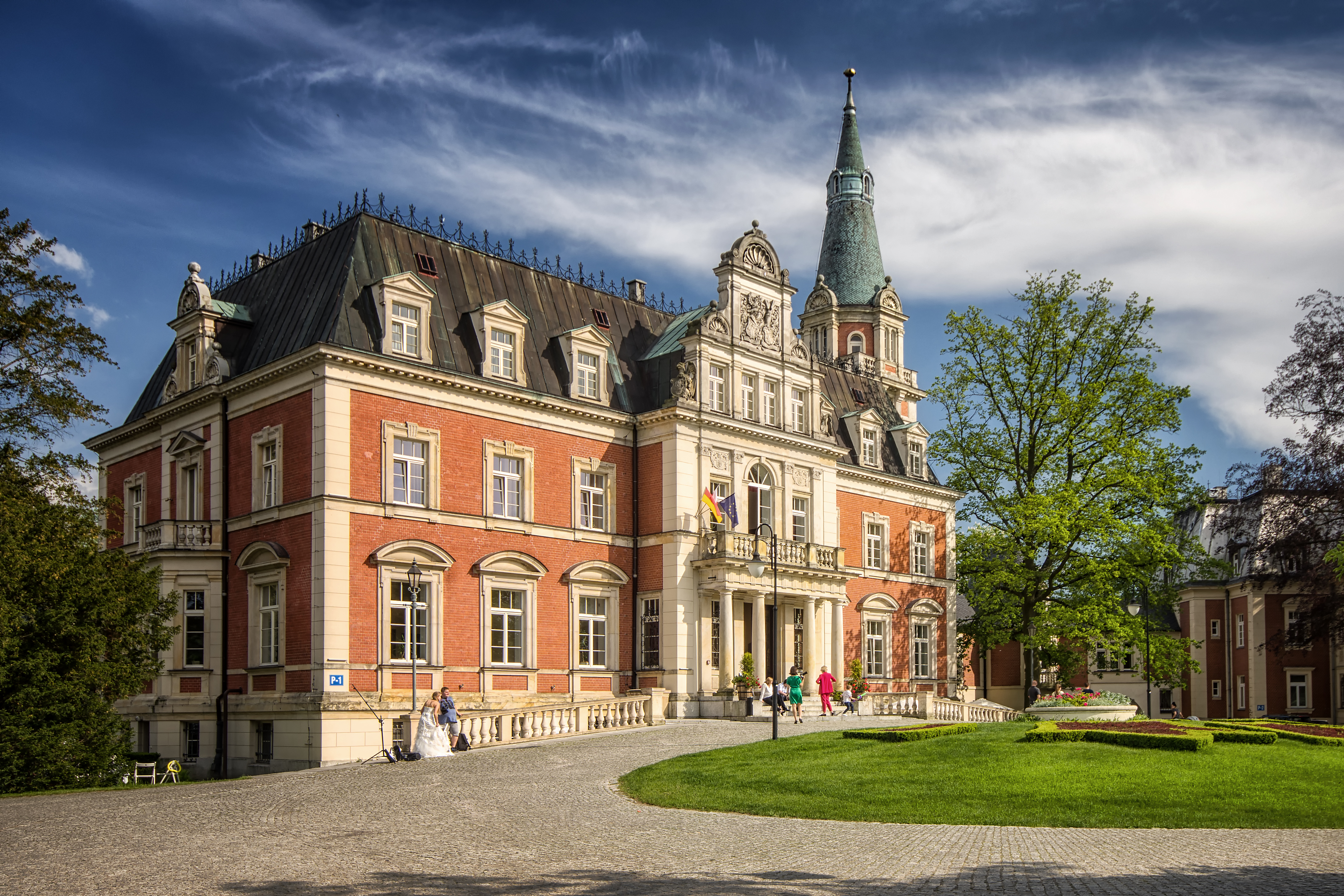

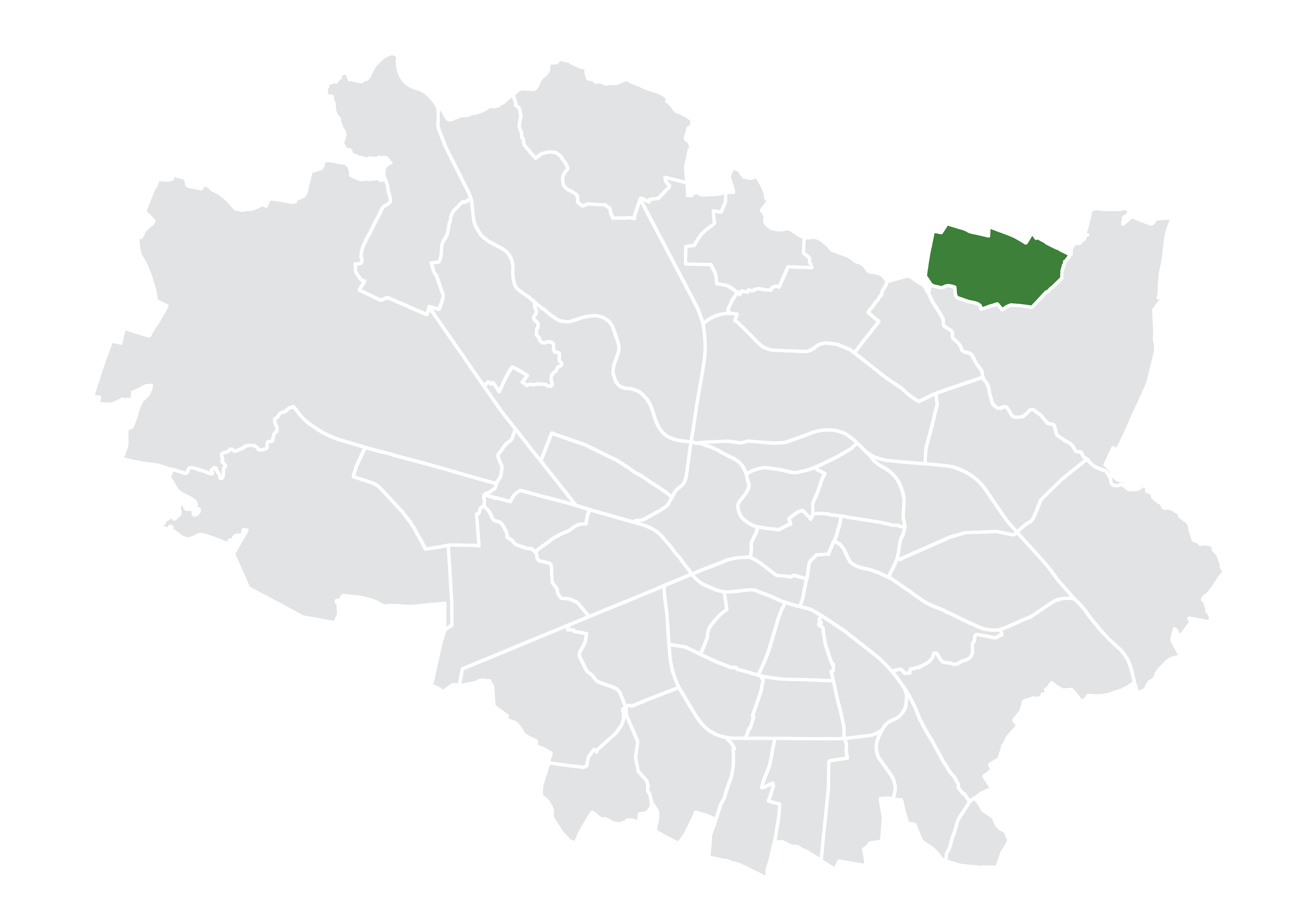
- Location of Pawłowice within Wrocław
- Country: Poland
- Voivodeship: Lower Silesian
- County/City: Wrocław
- First mentioned: 1260
- Incorporated into the city: 1970
- Established the modern-day district: 1991

Population (2022)
  - Total: 2,398
- Time zone: UTC+1 (CET)
  - Summer (DST): UTC+2 (CEST)
- Area code: +48 71
- Website: Osiedle Pawłowice

Pawłowice (Polish pronunciation: [pavwɔˈvit͡sɛ], German: Pawelwitz, [ˈpaːvəlvɪt͡s]) is a district in Wrocław located in the north-eastern part of the city. It was established in the territory of the former Psie Pole district.

The district is bordered to the north by the gminy of Wisznia Mała and Długołęka. To the south, it is bordered by the Psie Pole-Zawidawie district of Wrocław.

== History ==
It was first mentioned in 1260, when it was part of medieval Piast-ruled Poland.

On February 1, 1937, during the Nazi era, Pawelwitz was renamed Wendelborn in order to remove traces of its Polish origin. The settlement was incorporated into Wrocław on March 31, 1970.

In 1991, after reforms in the administrative division of Wrocław, Pawłowice became one of the city's 48 districts.
