= Kotovo, Ustyuzhensky District, Vologda Oblast =

Kotovo Котово
- Village
- Location within Vologda Oblast Location within Russia
- Coordinates: 59°07′N 36°24′E
- Country: Russia
- Region: Vologda Oblast
- District: Ustyuzhensky District
- Time zone: UTC+3:00

Kotovo (Russian: Котово) is a rural locality (a village) in Nikiforovskoye Rural Settlement, Ustyuzhensky District, Vologda Oblast, Russia. The population was 2 as of 2002.

== Geography ==
Kotovo is located 46 km (29 mi) north of Ustyuzhna (the district's administrative centre) by road. Byvaltsevo is the nearest rural locality.
