= Kotovo, Chagodoshchensky District, Vologda Oblast =

Kotovo Котово
- Village
- Location within Vologda Oblast Location within Russia
- Coordinates: 58°52′N 35°29′E
- Country: Russia
- Region: Vologda Oblast
- District: Chagodoshchensky District
- Time zone: UTC+3:00

Kotovo (Russian: Котово) is a rural locality (a village) in Lukinskoye Rural Settlement, Chagodoshchensky District, Vologda Oblast, Russia. The population was 11 as of 2002.

== Geography ==
Kotovo is located 53 km (33 mi) south of Chagoda (the district's administrative centre) by road. Sirotovo is the nearest rural locality.
