= Kotovo, Belgorod Oblast =

Kotovo Котово
- Selo
- Location within Belgorod Oblast Location within Russia
- Coordinates: 51°17′N 37°59′E
- Country: Russia
- Region: Belgorod Oblast
- District: Starooskolsky District
- Time zone: UTC+3:00

Kotovo (Russian: Котово) is a rural locality (a selo) in Starooskolsky District, Belgorod Oblast, Russia. The population was 944 as of 2010. There are 18 streets.

== Geography ==
Kotovo is located 15 km east of Stary Oskol (the district's administrative centre) by road. Ilyiny is the nearest rural locality.
