= Biestrzyków =

- Village
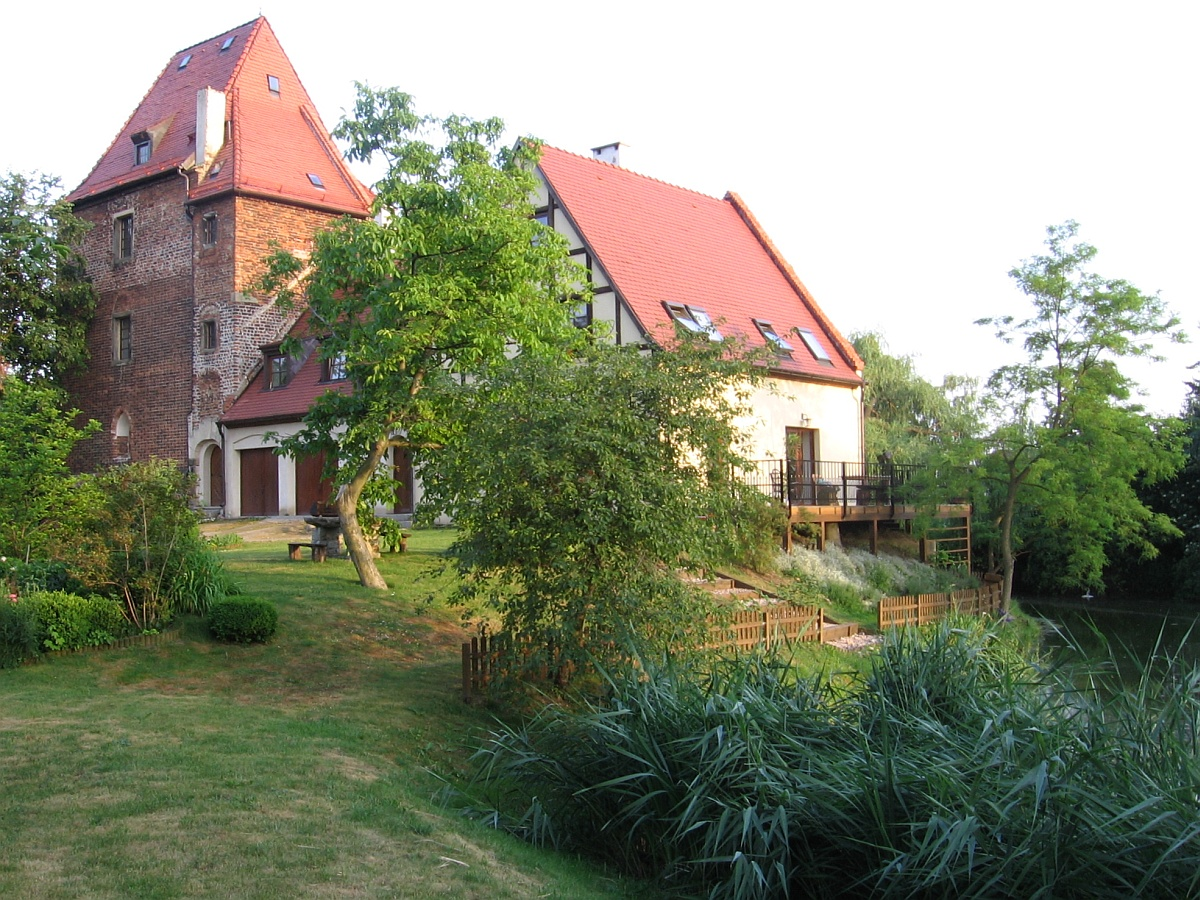
- Tower house in Biestrzyków

- Location within Poland
- Coordinates: 51°02′01″N 17°02′15″E
- Country: Poland
- Voivodeship: Lower Silesian
- County: Wrocław
- Gmina: Siechnice
- Time zone: UTC+1 (CET)
  - Summer (DST): UTC+2 (CEST)
- Postal code: 55-010
- Vehicle registration: DWR

Biestrzyków (Polish pronunciation: [bjɛstˈʂɨkuf]) is a village in the administrative district of Gmina Siechnice, within Wrocław County, Lower Silesian Voivodeship, in south-western Poland.
