= Domaszczyn =

- Village
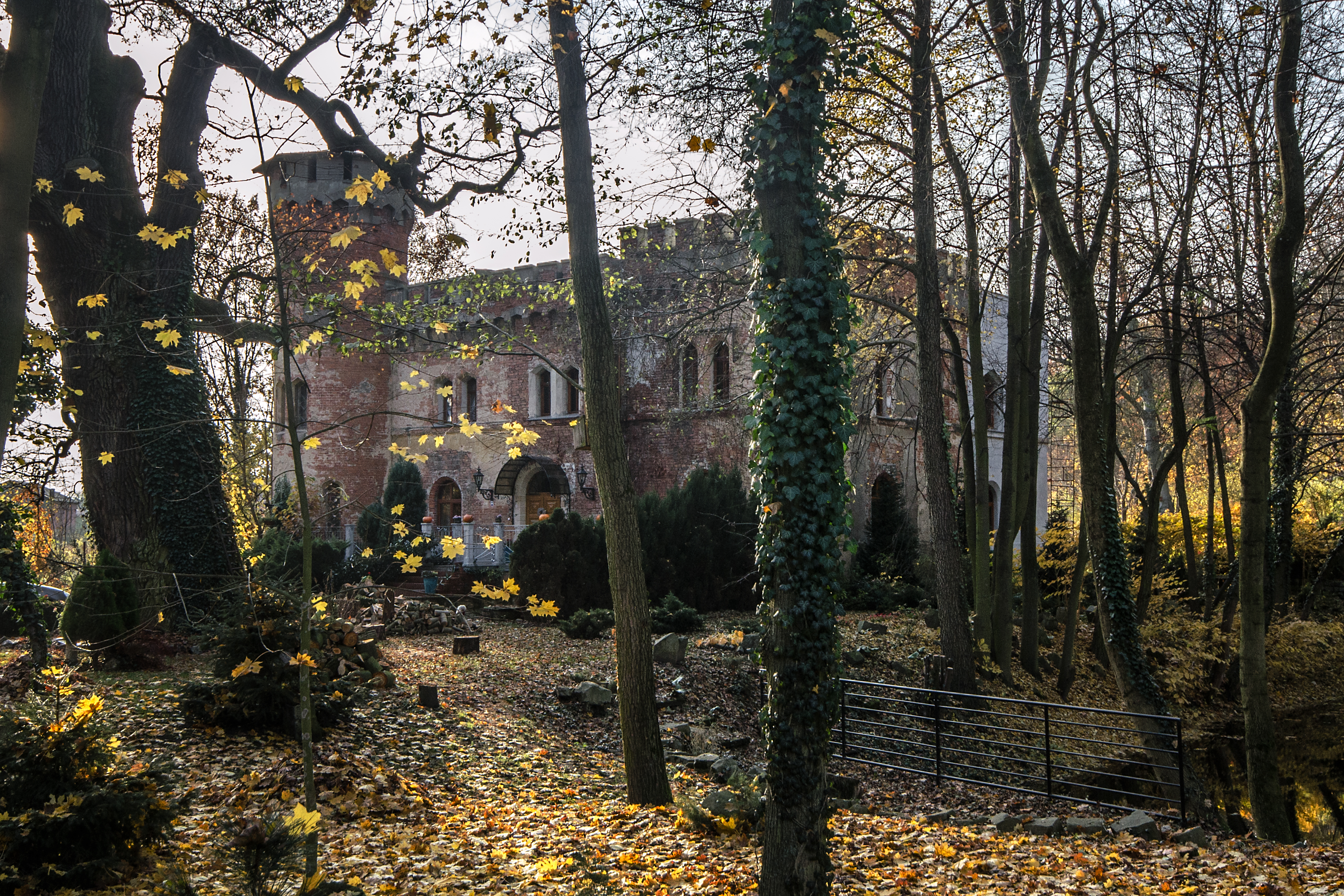
- Palace

- Location within Poland
- Coordinates: 51°11′17″N 17°09′53″E
- Country: Poland
- Voivodeship: Lower Silesian
- County: Wrocław
- Gmina: Długołęka

Domaszczyn [dɔˈmaʂt͡ʂɨn] is a village in the administrative district of Gmina Długołęka, within Wrocław County, Lower Silesian Voivodeship, in south-western Poland.
