= Pruszowice =

- Village
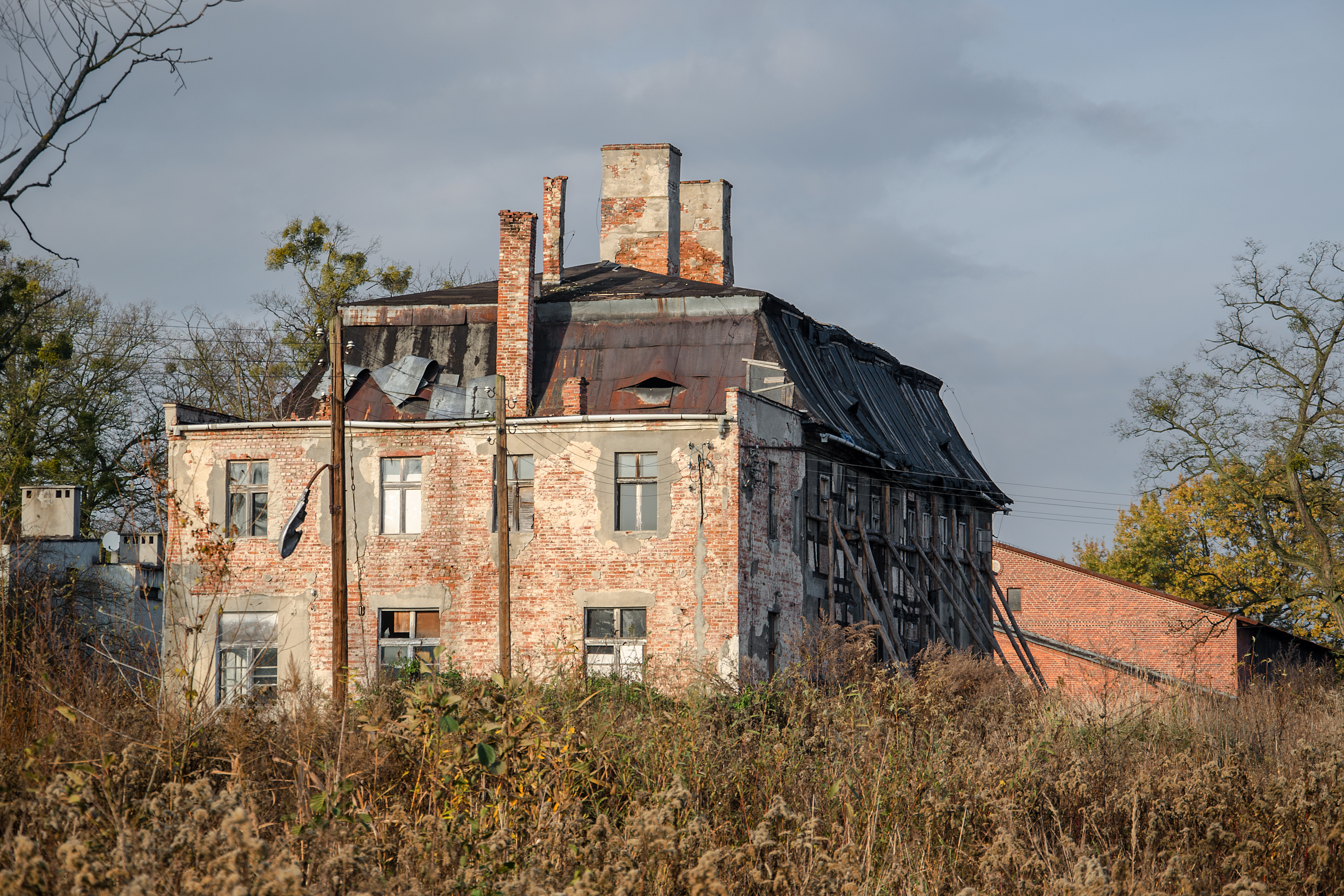

- Location within Poland
- Coordinates: 51°11′N 17°8′E
- Country: Poland
- Voivodeship: Lower Silesian
- County: Wrocław
- Gmina: Długołęka
- Population: 250

Pruszowice [pruʂɔˈvit͡sɛ] is a village in the administrative district of Gmina Długołęka, within Wrocław County, Lower Silesian Voivodeship, in south-western Poland.

== Notable residents ==
- Mauritz Freiherr von Strachwitz (1898–1953), Wehrmacht general
