= Chrząstawa Wielka =

- Village
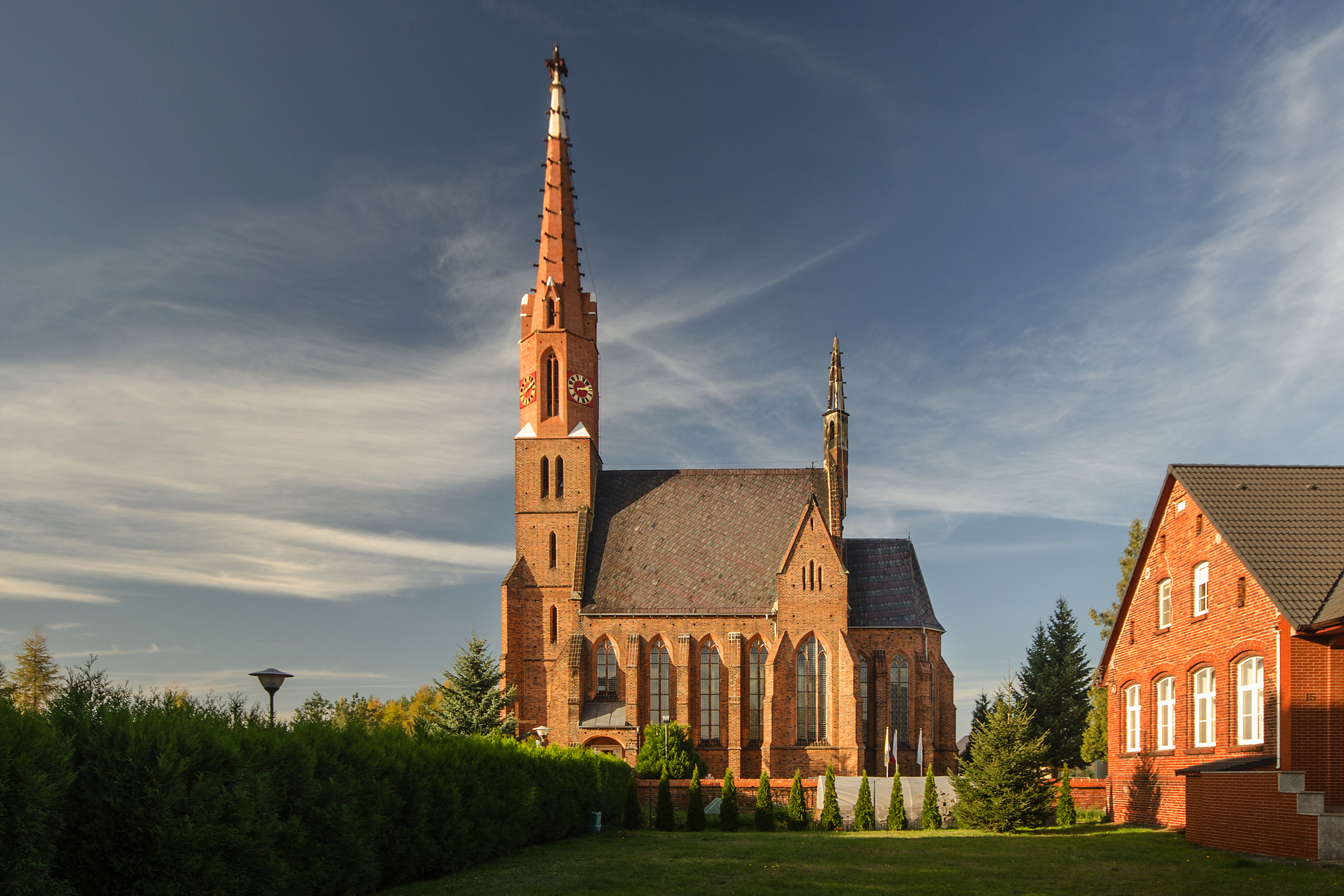
- Church of the Immaculate Conception of the Virgin Mary

- Location within Poland
- Coordinates: 51°5′48″N 17°18′26″E
- Country: Poland
- Voivodeship: Lower Silesian
- County: Wrocław
- Gmina: Czernica

Chrząstawa Wielka [xʂɔ̃sˈtava ˈvjɛlka] is a village in the administrative district of Gmina Czernica, within Wrocław County, Lower Silesian Voivodeship, in south-western Poland.
