= Kotowo =

Kotowo may refer to the following places:

- Kotowo, part of the Grunwald district of Poznań
- Kotowo, Gmina Granowo, Grodzisk County in Greater Poland Voivodeship (west-central Poland)
- Kotowo, Gmina Dolsk in Greater Poland Voivodeship (west-central Poland)
- Kotowo, Gmina Śrem in Greater Poland Voivodeship (west-central Poland)
- Kotowo, Pomeranian Voivodeship (north Poland)
- Kotowo, Warmian-Masurian Voivodeship (north Poland)
