= Kotov (disambiguation) =

Kotov is a Russian surname.

Kotov may also refer to:

- 8246 Kotov, an asteroid
- Kotov syndrome, in chess

== See also ==
- Russian patrol ship Sergey Kotov, a ship sunk in March 2024
- Kotovo, several inhabited localities in Russia
