= Skałka, Lower Silesian Voivodeship =

Skałka
- Village
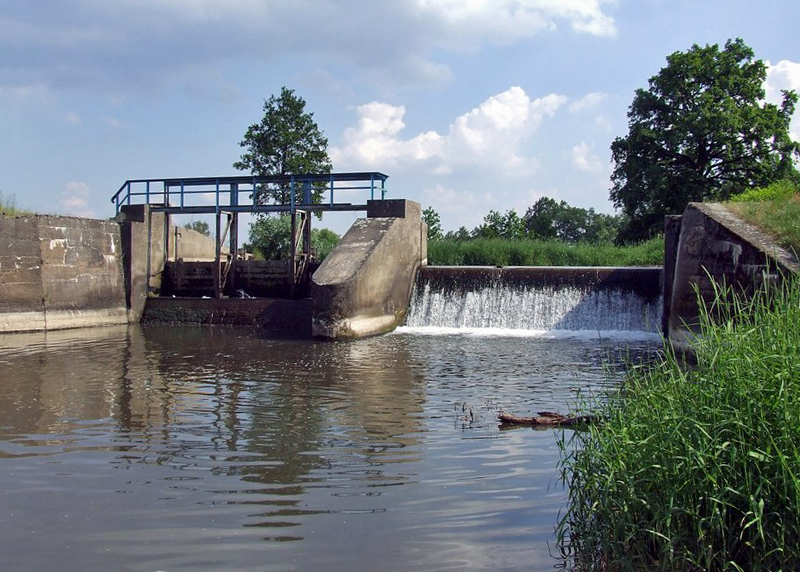

- Location within Poland
- Coordinates: 51°05′32″N 16°49′47″E
- Country: Poland
- Voivodeship: Lower Silesian
- County: Wrocław
- Gmina: Kąty Wrocławskie
- Population: 221

Skałka [ˈskau̯ka] is a village in the administrative district of Gmina Kąty Wrocławskie, within Wrocław County, Lower Silesian Voivodeship, in south-western Poland.
