= Jaszkotle =

- Village
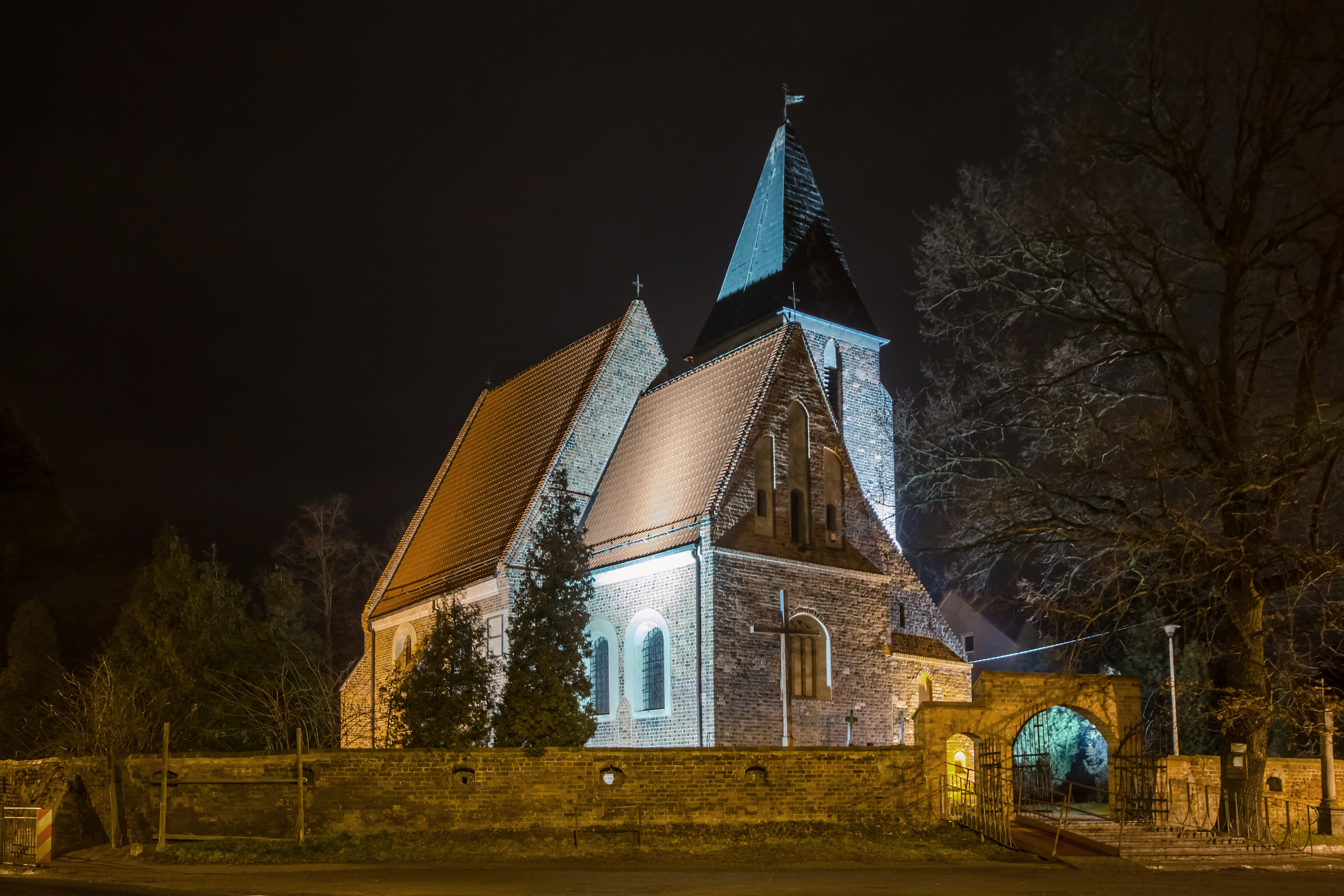

- Location within Poland
- Coordinates: 51°03′25″N 16°54′08″E
- Country: Poland
- Voivodeship: Lower Silesian
- County: Wrocław
- Gmina: Kąty Wrocławskie
- Population (approx.): 100

Jaszkotle [jaʂˈkɔtlɛ] is a village in the administrative district of Gmina Kąty Wrocławskie, within Wrocław County, Lower Silesian Voivodeship, in south-western Poland.

== Monuments ==
- Plague column from 1668.
