= Kotovo, Furmanovsky District, Ivanovo Oblast =

Kotovo Котово
- Village
- Location within Ivanovo Oblast Location within Russia
- Coordinates: 57°10′N 41°14′E
- Country: Russia
- Region: Ivanovo Oblast
- District: Furmanovsky District
- Time zone: UTC+3:00

Kotovo (Russian: Котово) is a rural locality (a village) in Furmanovsky District, Ivanovo Oblast, Russia. Population: 170 (2010 census);

== Geography ==
This rural locality is located 12 kilometres (7.5 mi) from Furmanov (the district's administrative centre), 26 kilometres (16 mi) from Ivanovo (capital of Ivanovo Oblast) and 269 kilometres (167 mi) from Moscow. Olyukovo is the nearest rural locality.
