= EV9 The Amber Route =

European cycling route

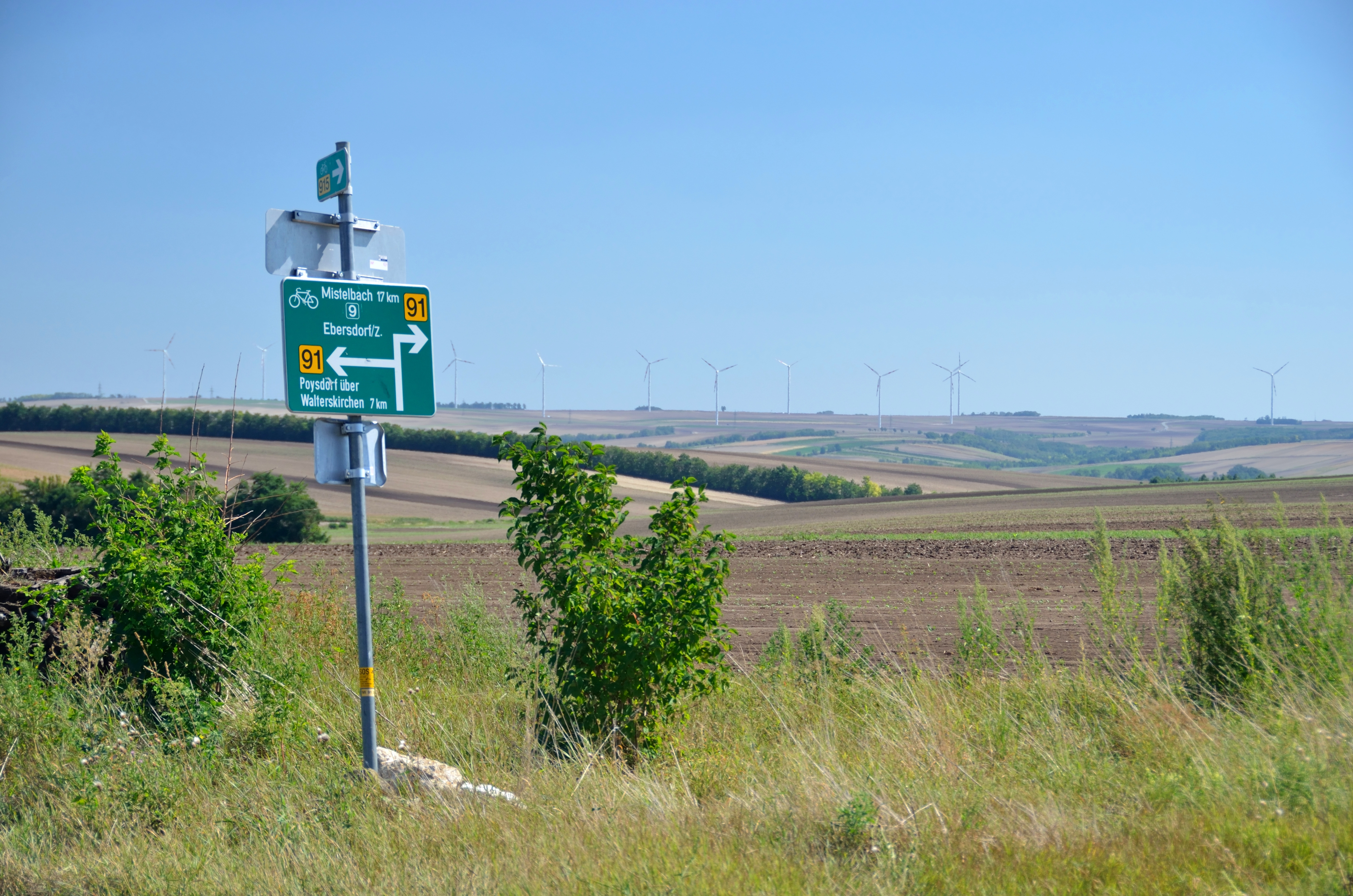
- Length: 1,900 km (1,200 mi)
- Designation: European Cyclists' Federation
- Trailheads: Gdańsk, Poland to Pula, Croatia
- Use: cycling
- Website: https://www.eurovelo.com/en/eurovelos/eurovelo-9
Trail map

Map of the EuroVelo 9 route.

EuroVelo 9 (EV9), named the Amber Route, is a 1,930 km (1,200 mi) long EuroVelo long-distance cycling route running from the city of Gdańsk, Poland on the Baltic Sea to Pula, Croatia, on the Adriatic Sea. It is called the Amber Route as historically the precious stone amber found in the Baltic region was taken by routes such as this to the Mediterranean Sea. This north-south cycle route runs through Central Europe and passes successively through six countries: Poland, the Czech Republic, Austria, Slovenia, Italy, and Croatia.

== Route ==
As of January 2014, the EV9 route is complete in some countries but not in others.

=== In Poland ===
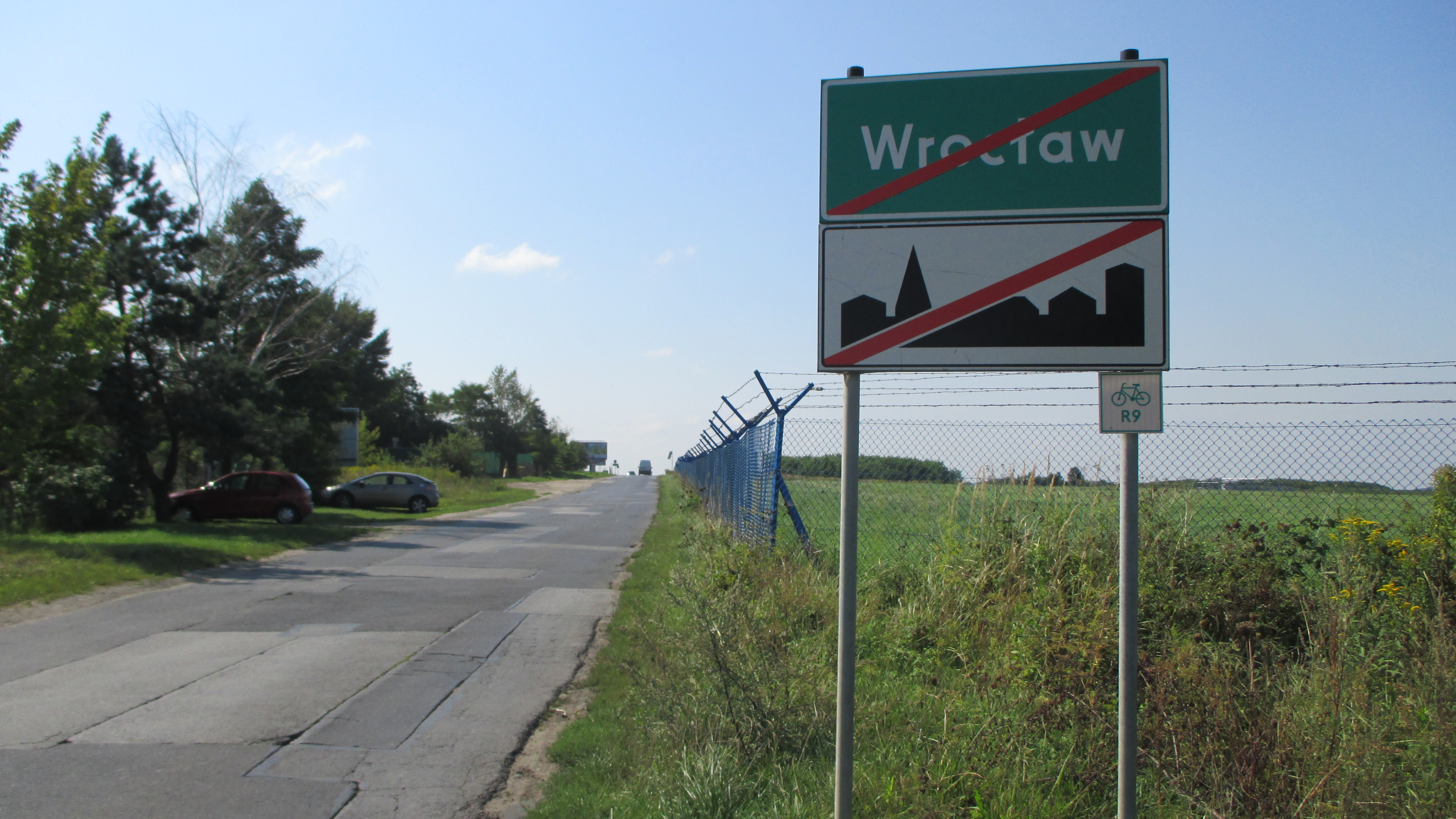
Sign R9 at the south-western border of Wrocław, near Wrocław Airport

As of January 2014, the EV9 in Poland is partly complete but the paths are not connected, so much riding will be on roads. It is scheduled to be complete by 2017/2018.

In Poland, the EV9 (In Poland, also labeled as R9) starts at the city of Gdańsk and passes along the Vistula river southwards through the cities of Tczew, Grudziądz, Bydgoszcz and Inowrocław. In 2020 by Kuyavian-Pomeranian Voivodeship Sejmik path was changed: removed Inowrocław and add Łabiszyn and Żnin.

From there it goes to the historical city of Poznań passing by the old capital city of Poland: Gniezno. From Poznań, EV9 heads southwards to the city of Wrocław – an important historic town on the Oder River and UNESCO site. From there it continues to Głuchołazy on the Czech–Polish border in the Opawskie Mountains.

The Polish section will be one of the flattest segments of the entire EV9. It passes through a great number of natural and historical sites such as the Vistula Landscape Park and the Wielkopolska National Park.

=== In the Czech Republic ===
As of January 2014, the EV9 in the Czech Republic is complete from Brno to the Austrian border. As for the rest of the route, until the cycling route is finished much riding will have to be on roads.

From Polish border the EV9 travels first through the historical region of Czech Silesia as it passes through the hills of the Eastern Sudetes. It then travels through the historical region of Moravia, passes through the town of Litovel on the Morava river floodplains to Olomouc, an important historic town and UNESCO site. From there the route continues through the flat and fertile area known as Hanakia and then the Moravian Karst, a unique area filled with caves, before arriving at the second largest city in the Czech Republic, Brno.

From Brno, the route is flat until Mikulov and the Pálava hills with surrounding vineyards, before the route comes to the UNESCO Lednice–Valtice Cultural Landscape area. After that, the EV9 passes through an area of floodplain forest and historic monuments to the city of Břeclav.

=== In Austria ===
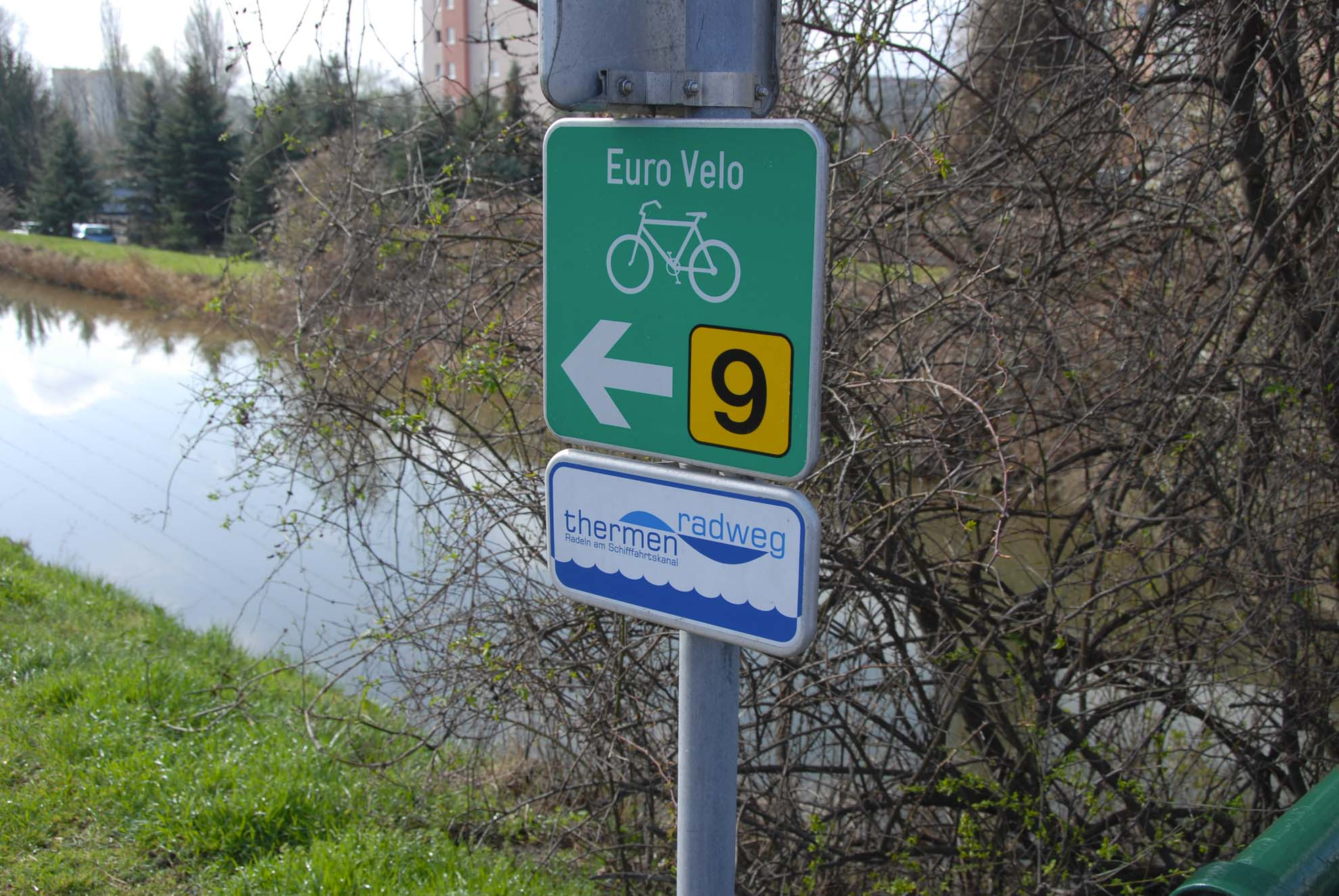
Signage for EuroVelo 9, Wiener Neustadt, Austria.

As of January 2014, the EV9 in Austria has been completed in its entirety.

Coming from the Czech border, the EV9 passes through the wine region of Weinviertel, past countryside of pumpkin and maize fields before coming to the Austrian capital of Vienna. From Vienna to Mönichkirchen, the EV9 follows the exact route of the Thermenradweg (Thermal Spa Cycling Trail) where hot mineral springs give rise to spa towns. After this, the EuroVelo 9 leads through Styria to Bad Radkersburg near the Slovenian border and goes along a section of the renowned R2 Murradweg (River Mur cycling trail) and at Spielfeld it heads to the Slovenian border.

=== In Slovenia ===
As of January 2014, the EV9 in Slovenia is still under development: though the route may still be cycled, it may be on busy roads.

In Slovenia, the EV9 starts at the border with Austria, passing briefly through Italy before coming back into Slovenia again, and ending at the seaside border with Croatia. The route passes through beautiful countryside as well as historic cities like Maribor and the capital, Ljubljana.

=== In Italy ===
As of January 2014, the EV9 in Italy is still under development: though the route may still be cycled, it may be on busy roads.

The EV9 only makes a short excursion into Italy from Slovenia to pass through the old port city of Trieste, before crossing the border south into Slovenia again.

=== In Croatia ===
As of January 2014, the EV9 in Croatia is still under development: though the route may still be cycled, it may be on busy roads.

In Croatia, the EuroVelo 9 ends by passing through the hills and valleys of western Istria where it provides views of the sea and countryside. The EV9 ends in Pula, a city whose history goes back beyond classical times. On its way it passes through the towns of Umag, Porec, Pula, the Lim channel and the UNESCO World Heritage Site listed Euphrasian Basilica. The route is currently not realised.

== Gallery ==
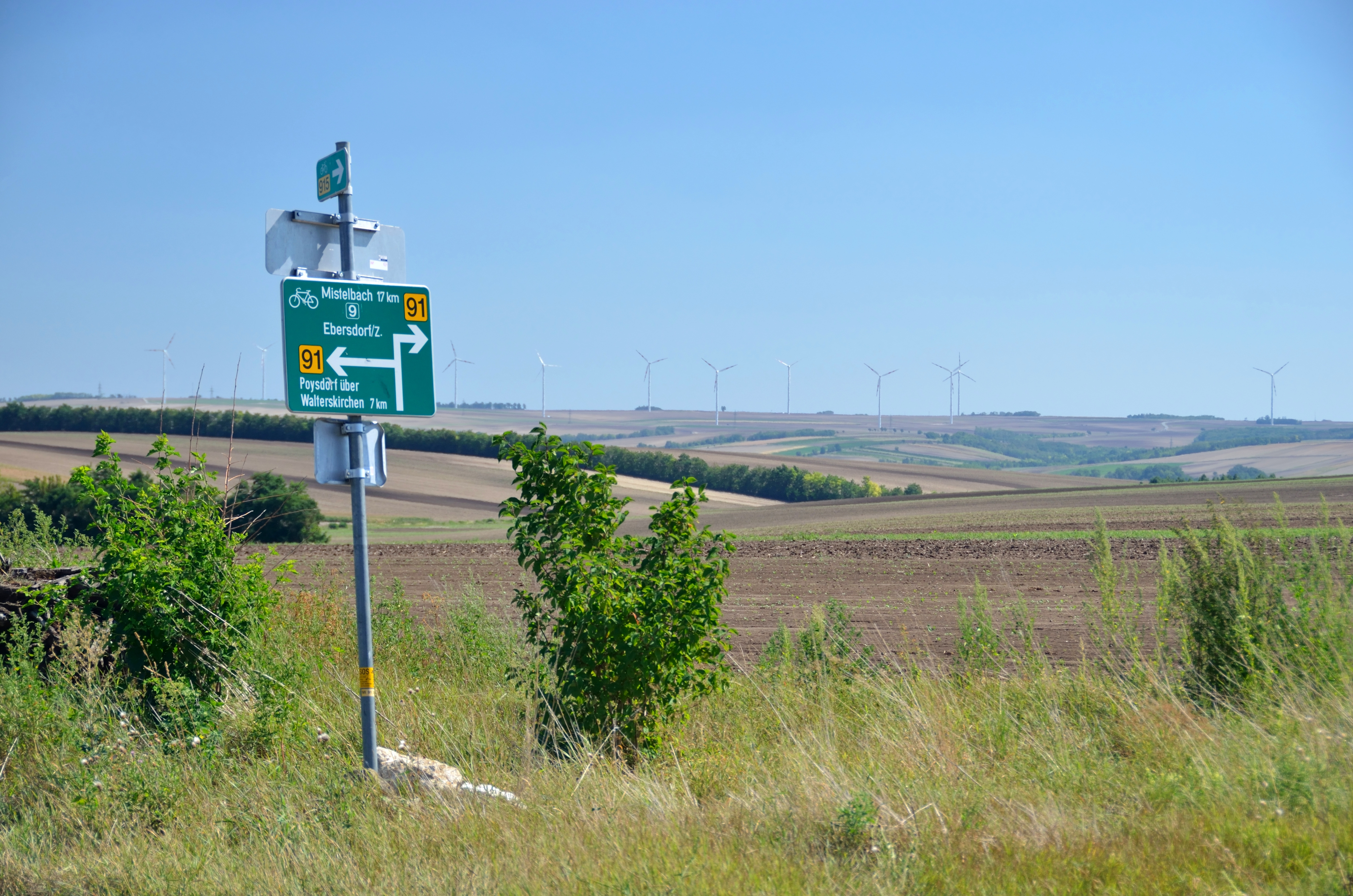
The EV9 (here Austrian cycling route 91) between Mistelbach and Poysdorf in Lower Austria, Austria.

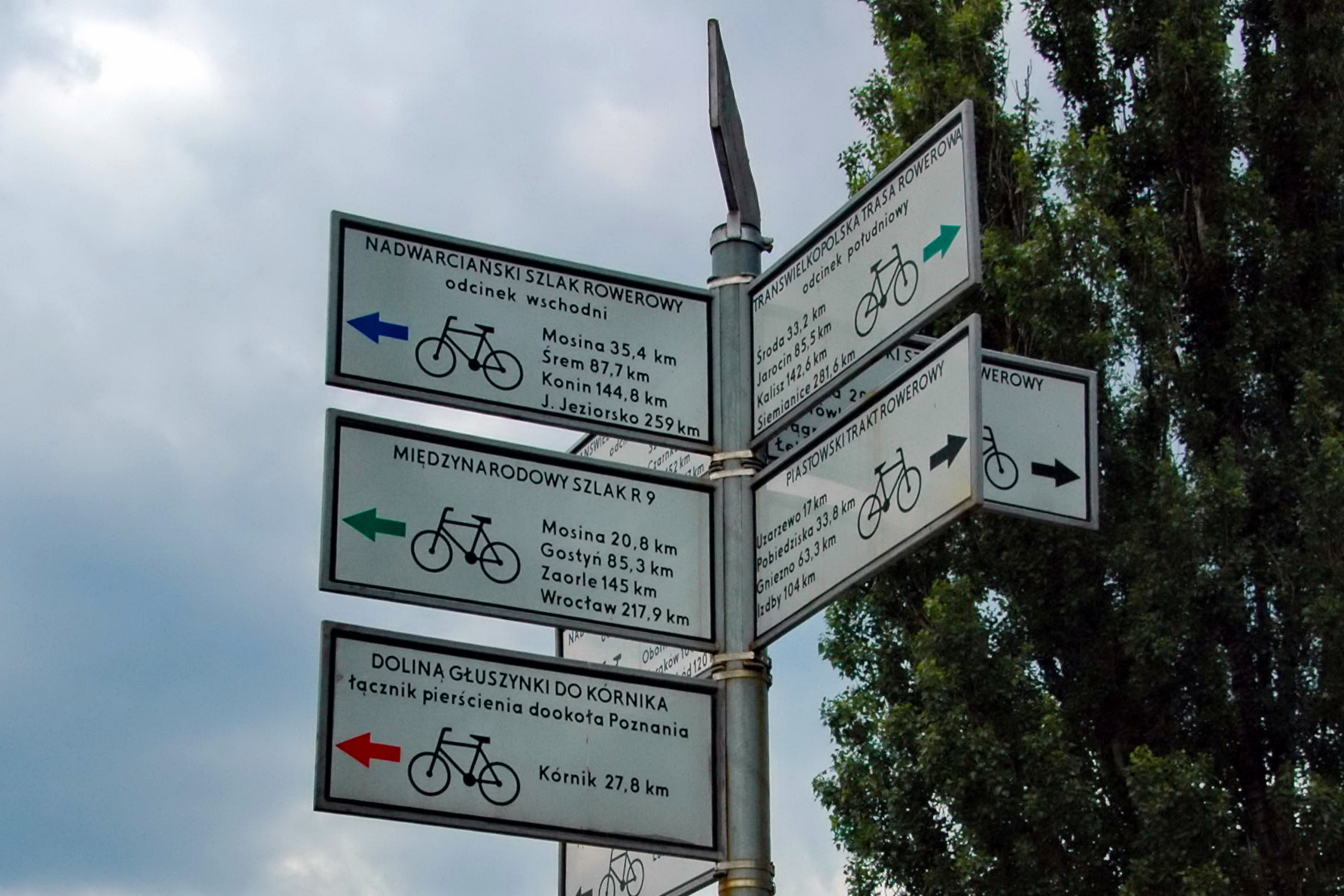
The EV9 (R9) among the cycling route signs at Lake Malta in Poznań, Poland.

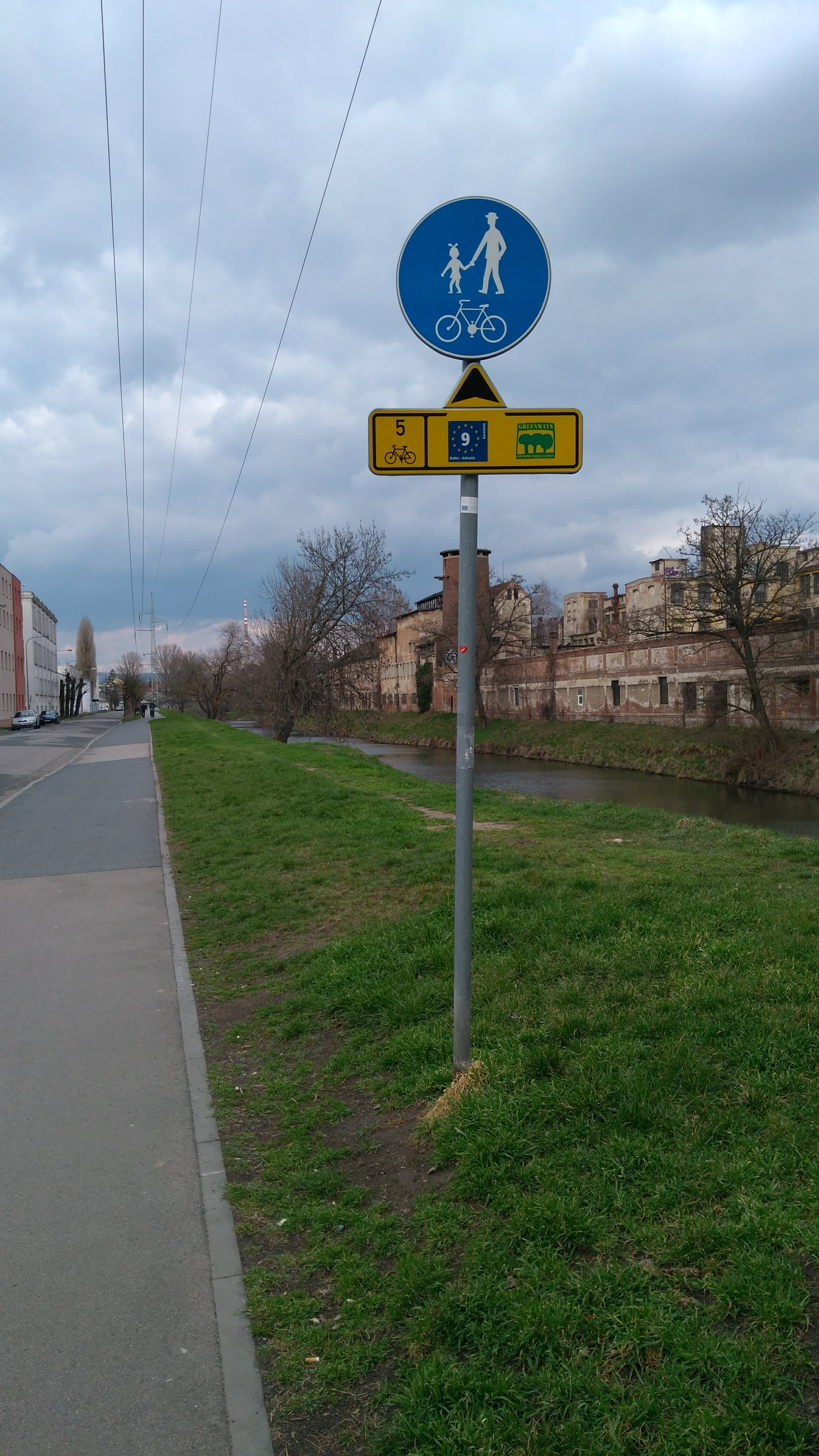
EV9 across the city of Brno, South Moravia, Czech Republic.

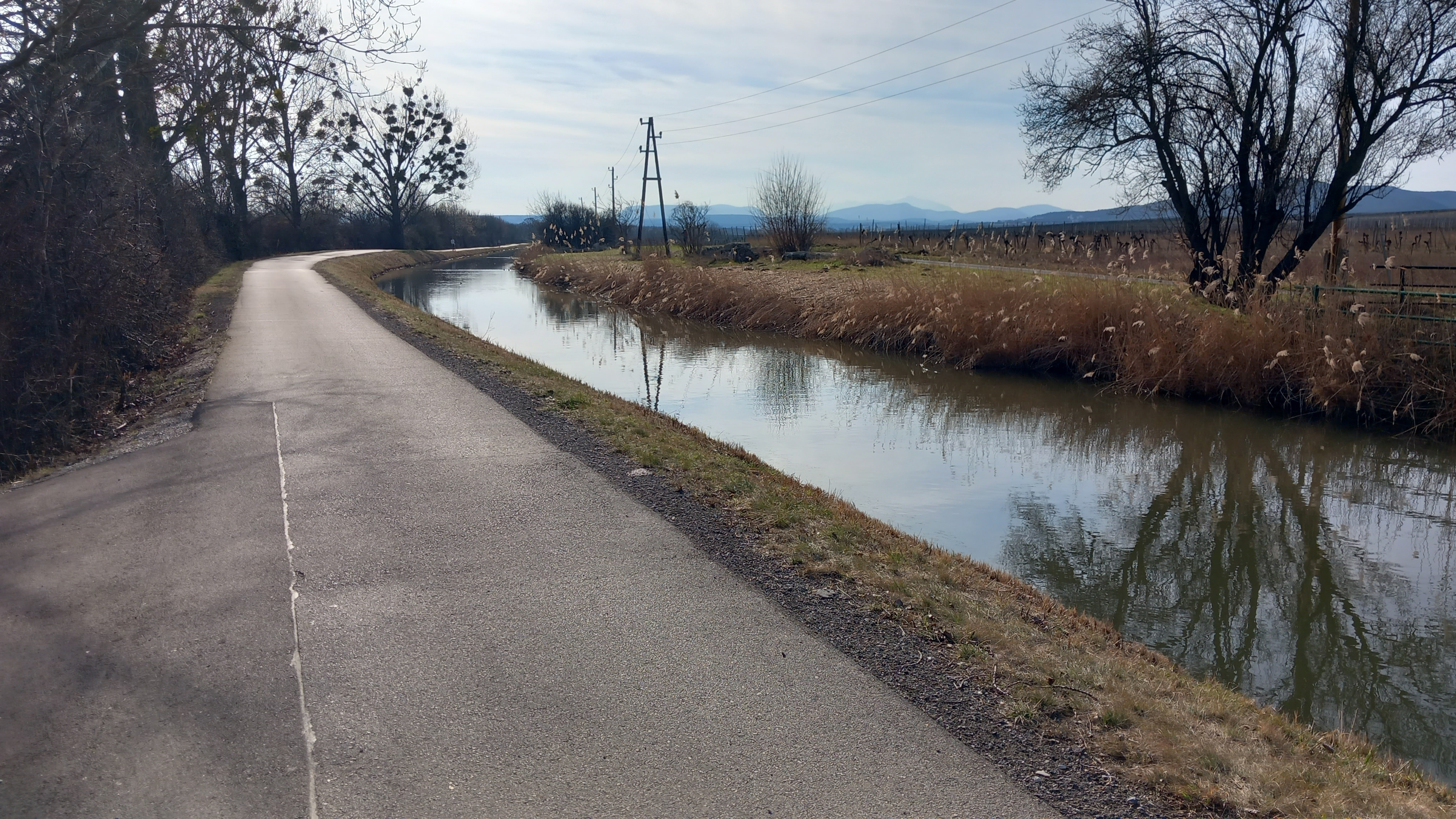
EV9 as "Thermenradweg" along the Wiener Neustadt Canal near Baden, Lower Austria, Austria.

== See also ==
- EuroVelo
