= Kotowice, Wrocław County =

Kotowice
- Village
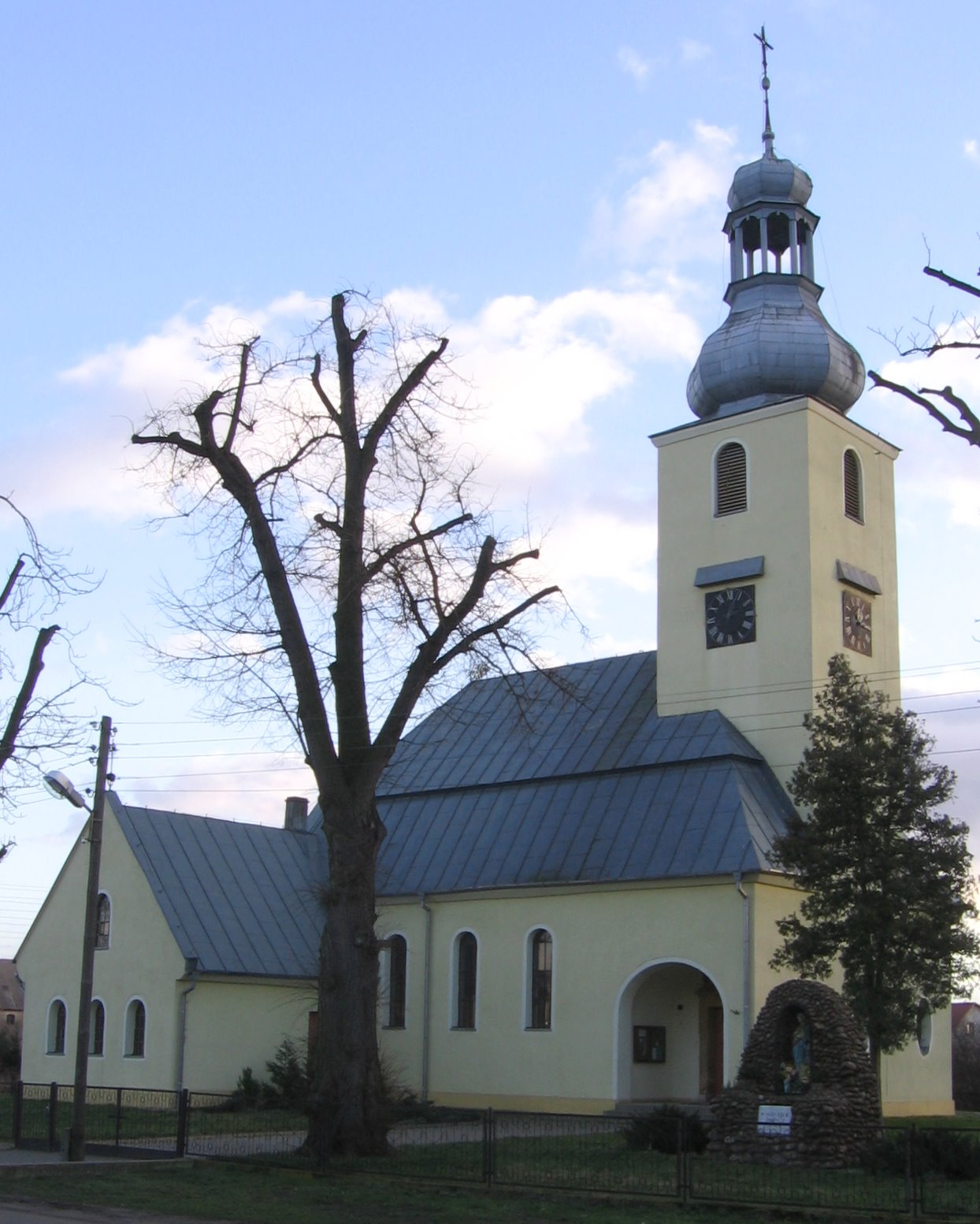
- Kotowice Kosciol

- Location within Poland
- Coordinates: 51°2′N 17°14′E
- Country: Poland
- Voivodeship: Lower Silesian
- County: Wrocław
- Gmina: Siechnice
- Population: 660
- Website: http://www.kotowice.pl

Kotowice [kɔtɔˈvit͡sɛ] is a village in the administrative district of Gmina Siechnice, within Wrocław County, Lower Silesian Voivodeship, in south-western Poland.

The village contains a small railroad station. It connects the village with Wrocław, Siechnice, and Jelcz-Laskowice.

The village is one of the place that suffered during the great flood in 1997.

In 2012, Kotowice opened an observation tower. The tower is 40 meters high.
