= Żurawski =

Żurawski (Polish pronunciation: [ʐuˈrafski]) (feminine Żurawska, plural Żurawscy) is a Polish locational surname, which originally meant a person from places in Poland called Żuraw, Żurawka or Żurawice, derived from the Polish word żuraw, meaning "crane". Variants of the name include Żorawski, and Żurawsky. The name may refer to:

- Andrzej Żurawski, Polish ice hockey player
- Artur Żurawski (born 1972), Polish cinematographer
- Chris Zurawsky (born 1962), American politician
- Maciej Żurawski (footballer, born 1976) (born 1976), Polish footballer
- Maciej Żurawski (footballer, born 2000), Polish footballer
- Martin Zurawsky (born 1990), German footballer
- Vitaly Zhuravsky (born 1955), Ukrainian politician
- Zdzisław Żurawski (born 1954), Polish military officer
- Kazimierz Żórawski (1866–1953), Polish mathematician
- Dmitrii Ivanovich Zhuravskii, also known as D.I. Jourawski (1821–1891), Russian engineer

== See also ==
- Pustków Żurawski, a village in Poland
