= Domasław =

Domasław may refer to the following places in Poland:

- Domasław in Gmina Kobierzyce, Wrocław County in Lower Silesian Voivodeship (SW Poland)
- Other places called Domasław (listed in Polish Wikipedia)
