= Krzyżowice =

Krzyżowice may refer to the following places in Poland:

- Krzyżowice, Lower Silesian Voivodeship (south-west Poland)
- Krzyżowice, Brzeg County in Opole Voivodeship (south-west Poland)
- Krzyżowice, Głubczyce County in Opole Voivodeship (south-west Poland)
- Krzyżowice, Silesian Voivodeship (south Poland)
