= Klecina =

District in Wrocław, Poland

- District of Wrocław
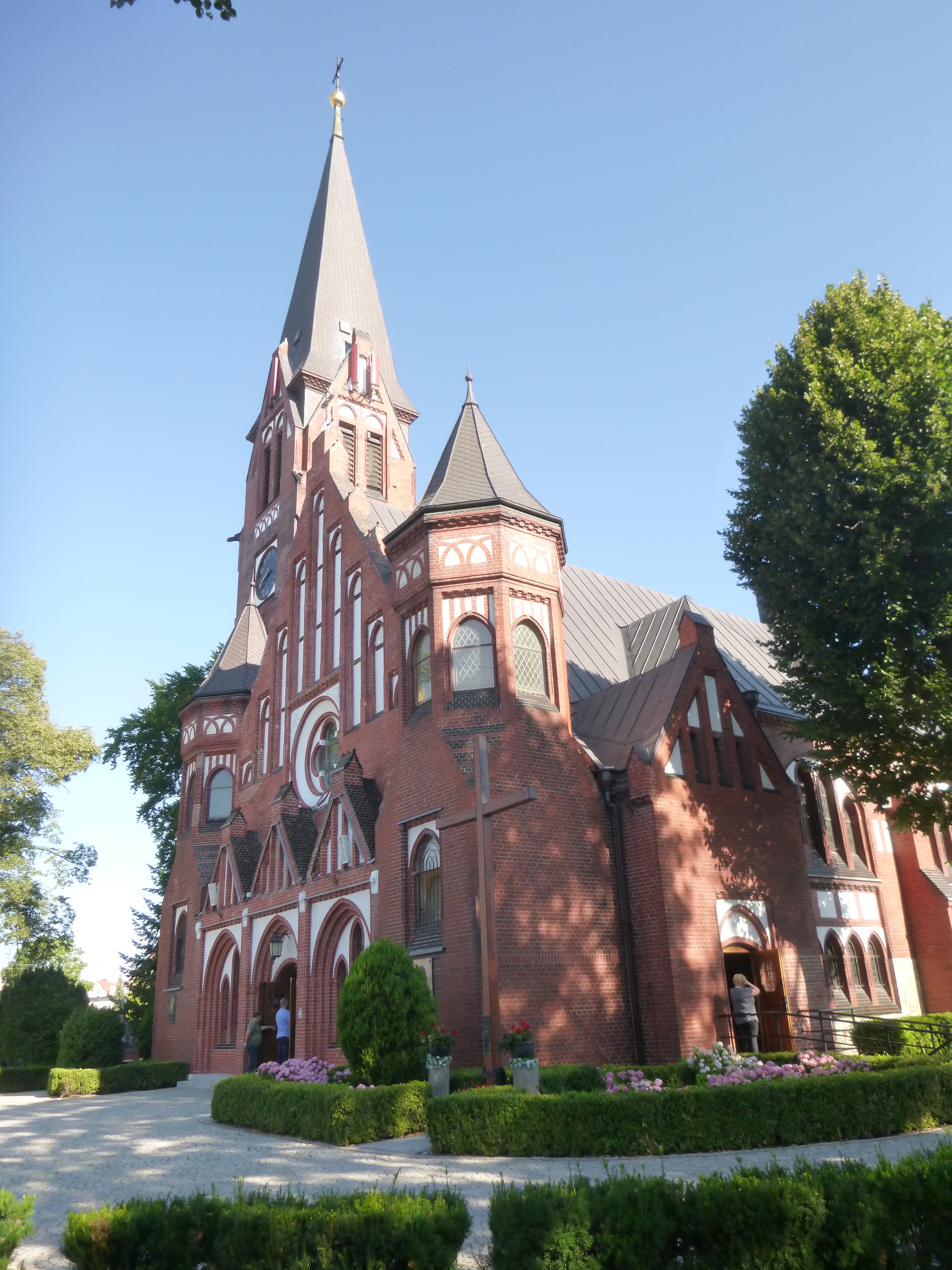
- Virgin Mary Queen of Poland church

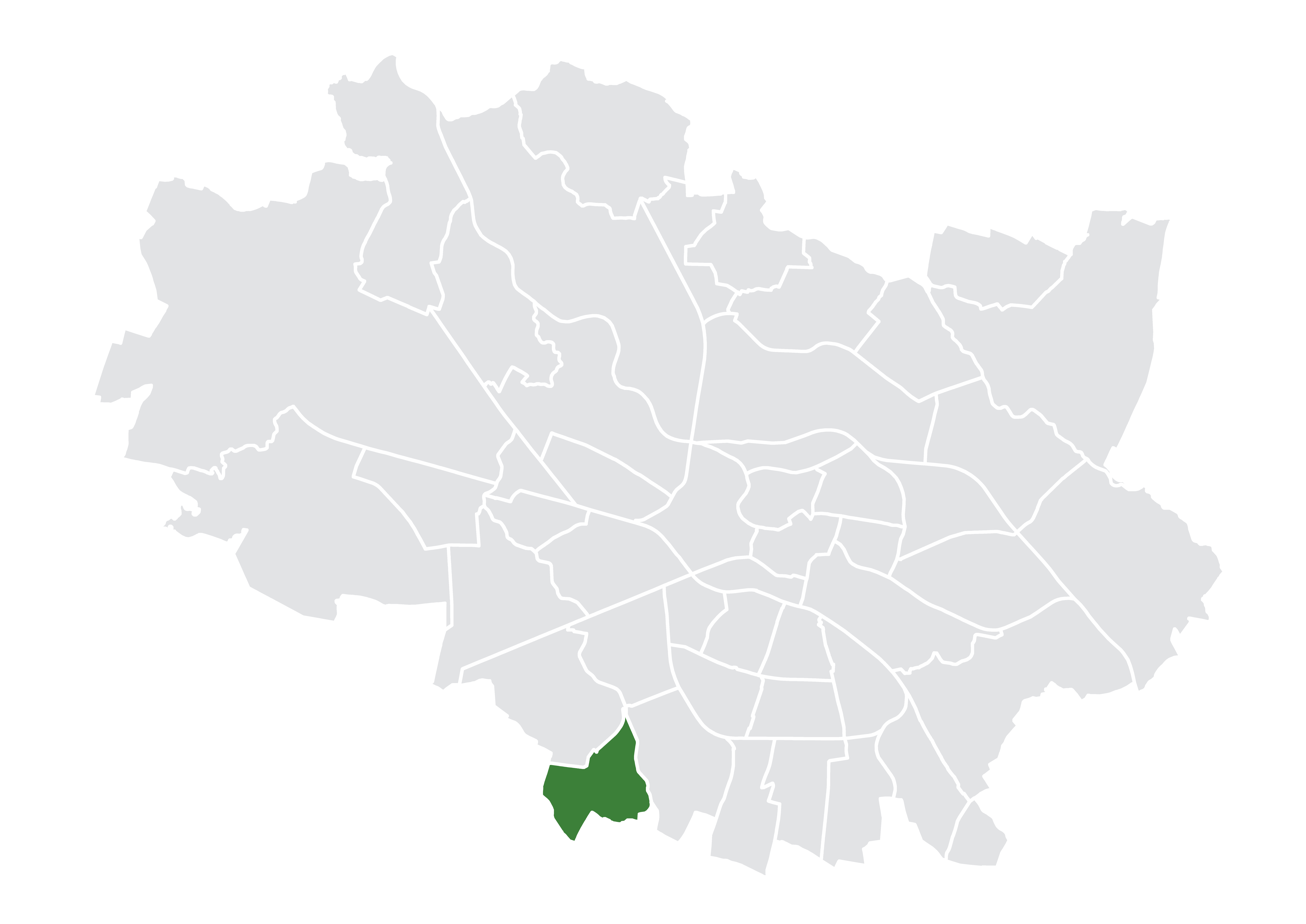
- Location of Klecina within Wrocław
- Country: Poland
- Voivodeship: Lower Silesian
- County/City: Wrocław
- Incorporated into the city: 1951
- Established the modern-day district: 1991

Population (2022)
  - Total: 7,647
- Time zone: UTC+1 (CET)
  - Summer (DST): UTC+2 (CEST)
- Area code: +48 71
- Website: klecina.wroclaw.pl

Klecina (Polish pronunciation: [klɛˈt͡ɕina], German: Klettendorf, [ˈklɛtəndɔɐ̯f]) is a district in Wrocław, Poland, located in the southern part of the city. It was established in the territory of the former Krzyki borough.

Initially a village, the settlement was incorporated into Wrocław in 1951.

== History ==
The village was first mentioned in 1313, under the name of Clettindorf, when it was part of the Duchy of Wrocław within fragmented Piast-ruled Poland. This is believed to be the first written record of the name, in a document describing a historic trade transaction.

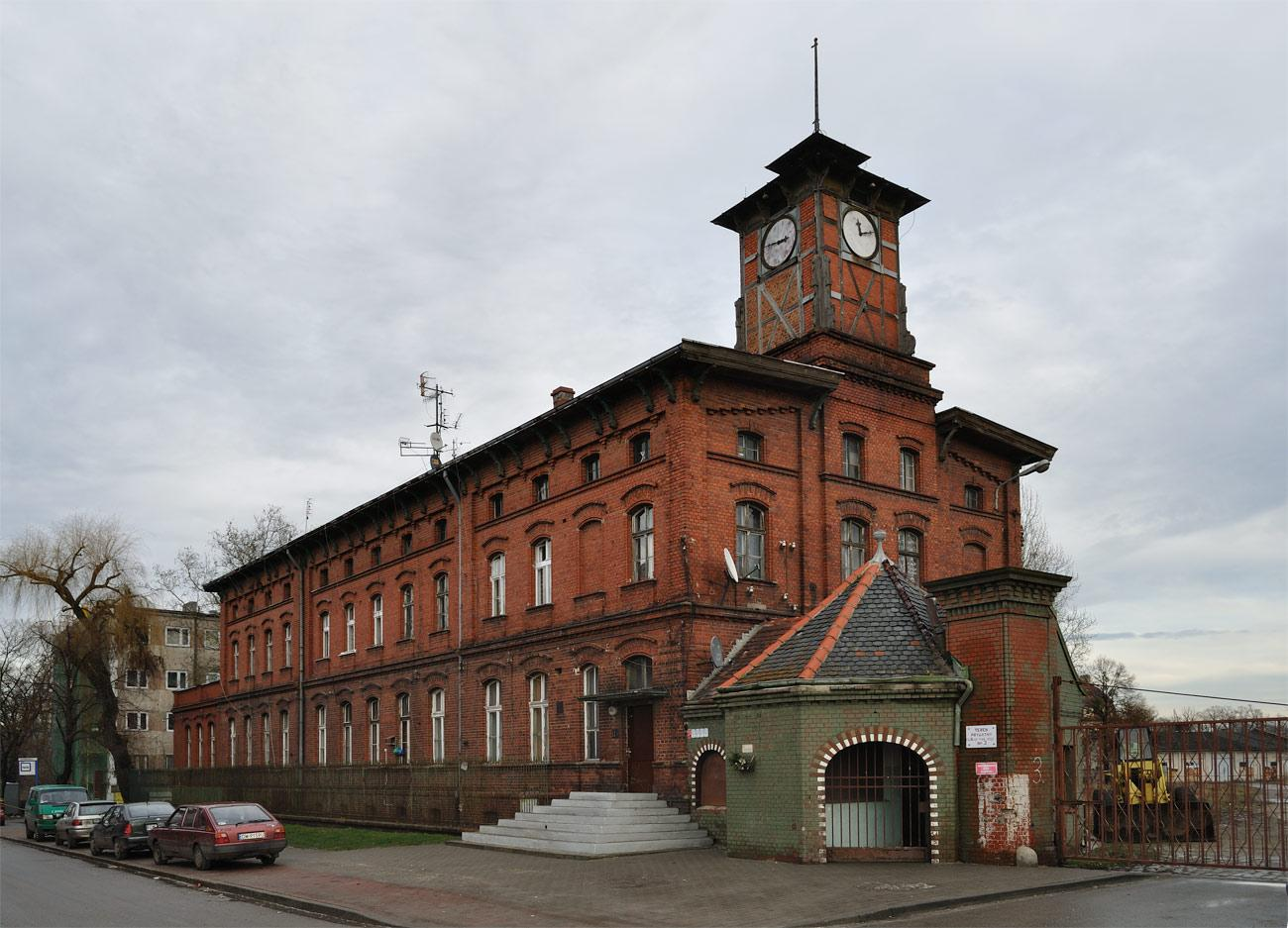
Former sugar factory

In the 18th century, the village was annexed by Prussia. In 1835, the first sugar factory in the Breslau area was established in Klettendorf. The development of the entire village of Klettendorf was significantly influenced by the sugar factory. It provided jobs for the residents, which led to the growth of the village. In 1845, Klettendorf had a population of 441 people, and by 1910, the population had increased to about 2,500. The sugar factory owners constructed housing, a health clinic, and a sewage system for their workers. Additionally, a retirement home was built in Koberwitz (Kobierzyce) to assist retirees.

During World War II, from August 1940 to late 1944, Nazi Germany operated a forced labour camp for Jews in the settlement.

After the surrender of Breslau in May 1945, the sugar factory served as a prison for German soldiers. Additionally, it became the largest warehouse for the spoils of war that the Russians brought from looted Breslau. The warehouse contained everything from furniture to instruments and typewriters. The spoils were then transported to the USSR. The hangar and grass runway in Klecina were also used by Soviet troops to repair aircraft parts. In 1946, the rest of the German population in Klecina left their homes.

The citizens of Klettendorf opposed the idea of incorporating their town into Breslau due to the potential increase in taxes and the risk of losing their lands where they grew beets for production. They were successful in maintaining Klettendorf's independence until 1945 when Wrocław (Breslau) became again a part of Poland. In 1951, Klecina was incorporated into Wrocław by the Polish administration.

In 1946, the sugar factory in Klecina resumed production. The neighbourhood had a negative reputation for years, and the fumes emanating from the factory did not attract residents to the area. The neighbourhood was primarily occupied by sugar factory workers from all over Poland for only a few months each year during the beet campaign period when labour was required to harvest the beets. Individuals from outside of Wrocław did not feel a connection to the area.

In 1991, after reforms in the administrative division of Wrocław, Klecina became one of the city's 48 districts. Until 1991, Soviet Army troops were stationed in Klecina.

The factory eventually closed in 1997 and the complex was demolished in 1999.

The neighbourhood now serves a mostly residential purpose, like many other south Wrocław districts. It borders Bielany Wrocławskie, a major trade centre in the Wrocław metropolitan area. The former factory complex areas have been revitalised and repurposed for parks and recreational use. Many street and place names honour the historical heritage of the area. The area is home to a Korean minority.
