= Królikowice =

Królikowice may refer to:

- Królikowice, Lower Silesian Voivodeship (south-west Poland)
- Królikowice, Lubusz Voivodeship (west Poland)
