= Owsianka =

Owsianka may refer to the following places in Poland:

- Owsianka, Lower Silesian Voivodeship (south-west Poland)
- Owsianka, Pomeranian Voivodeship (north Poland)
