= Jaszowice =

Jaszowice may refer to the following places in Poland:

- Jaszowice, Lower Silesian Voivodeship (south-west Poland)
- Jaszowice, Masovian Voivodeship (east-central Poland)
