= Budziszów =

Budziszów may refer to the following places in Poland:

- Budziszów, Gmina Kostomłoty, Środa County in Lower Silesian Voivodeship (SW Poland)
- Budziszów, Wrocław County (in Gmina Kobierzyce), Lower Silesian Voivodeship (SW Poland)
