= Dobkowice =

Dobkowice may refer to the following places in Poland:

- Dobkowice, Lower Silesian Voivodeship (south-west Poland)
- Dobkowice, Subcarpathian Voivodeship (south-east Poland)
