= Cieszyce =

Cieszyce may refer to:

- Cieszyce, Szczecin
- Cieszyce, Lower Silesian Voivodeship (south-west Poland)
- Cieszyce, West Pomeranian Voivodeship (north-west Poland)
