= Tyniec nad Ślęzą =

- Village
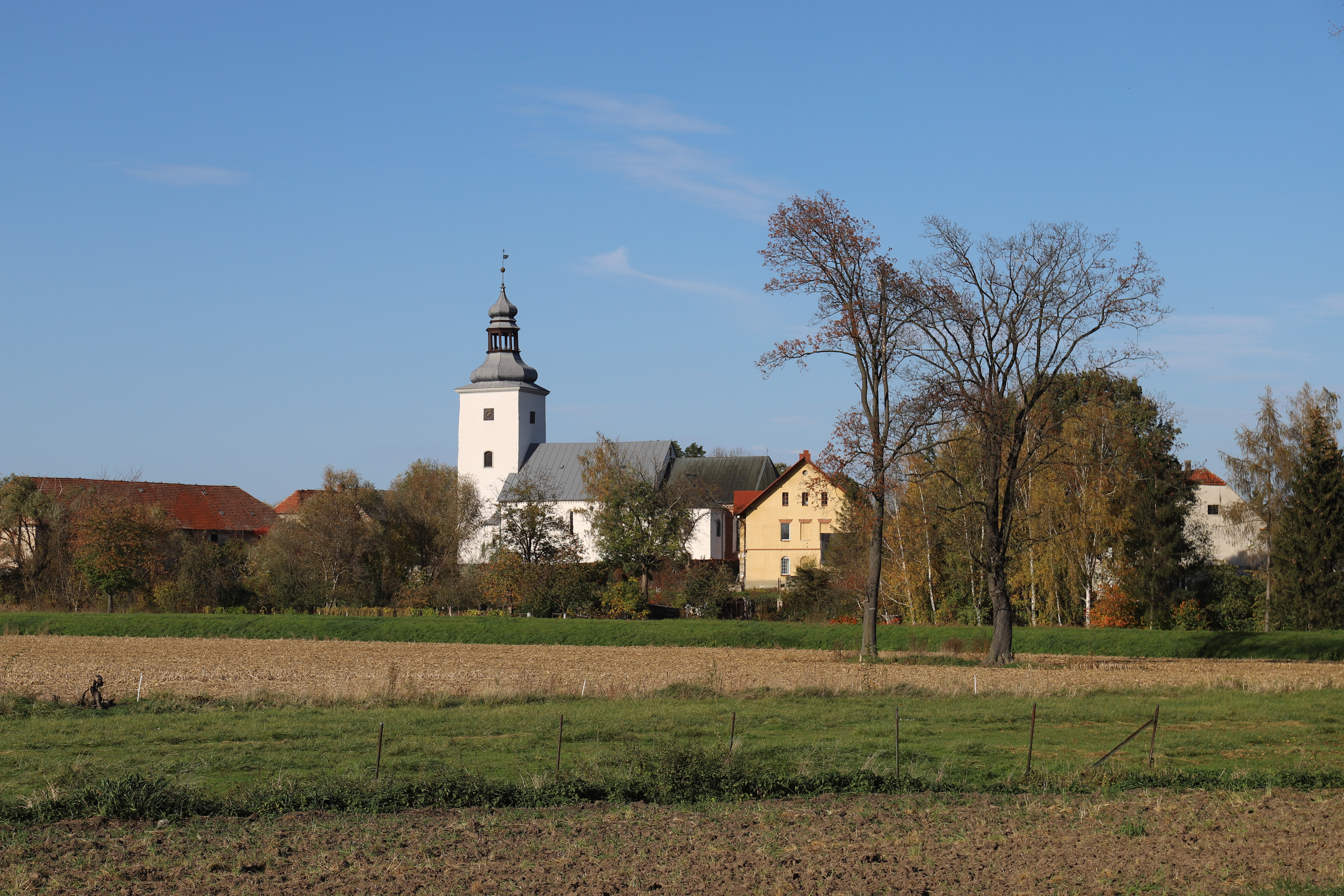

- Location within Poland
- Coordinates: 50°53′18″N 16°55′41″E
- Country: Poland
- Voivodeship: Lower Silesian
- County: Wrocław
- Gmina: Kobierzyce
- Population: 577

Tyniec nad Ślęzą [ˈtɨɲɛt͡s ˌnat ˈɕlɛ̃zɔ̃] is a village in the Administrative District of Gmina Kobierzyce, within Wrocław County, Lower Silesian Voivodeship, in south-western Poland.

== Monuments ==
- Gothic wayside shrine
- Baroque statue of St. John of Nepomuk
