= Solna, Poland =

Solna
- Village
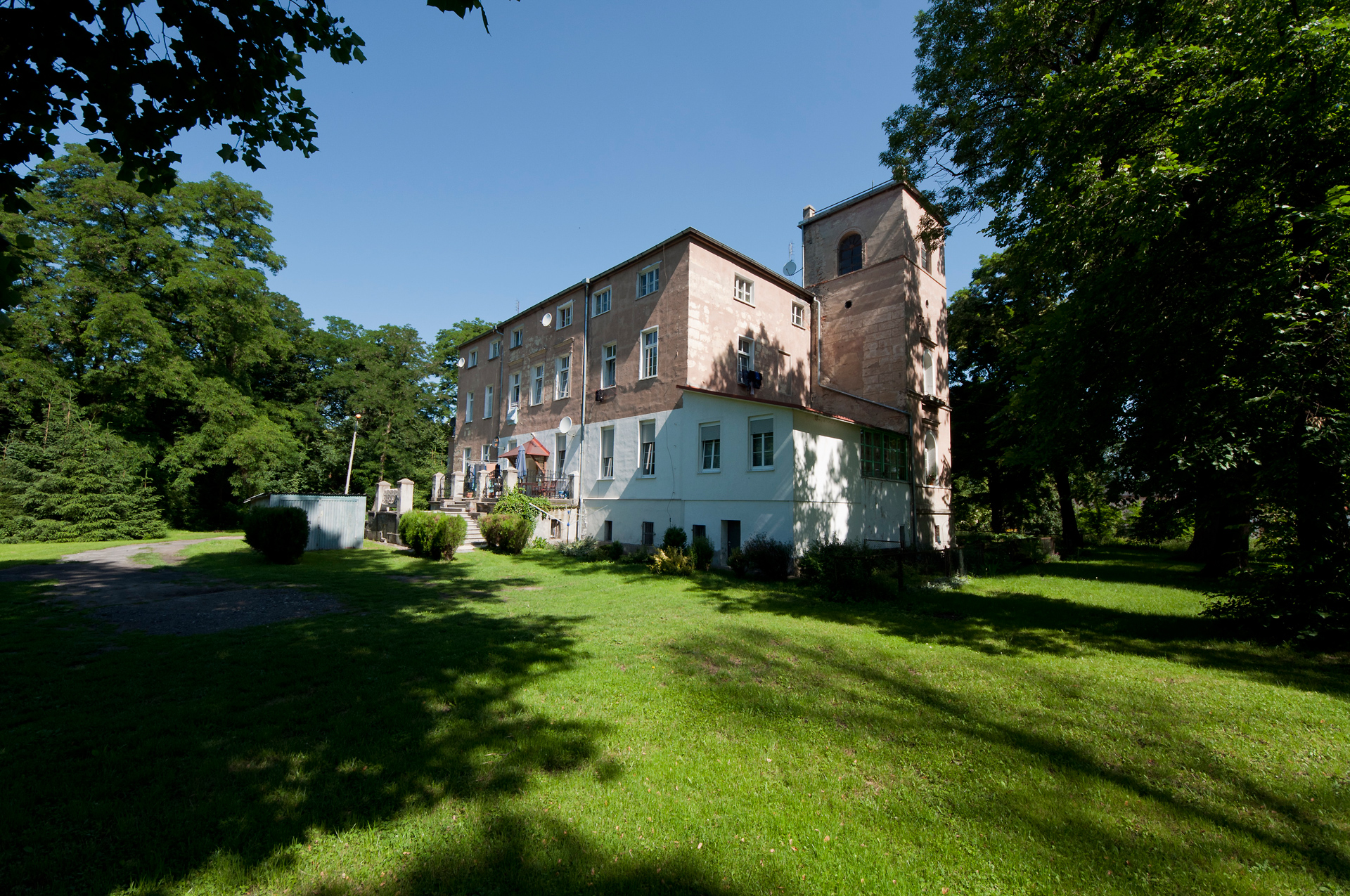
- Manor

- Location within Poland
- Coordinates: 50°57′N 16°52′E
- Country: Poland
- Voivodeship: Lower Silesian
- County: Wrocław
- Gmina: Kobierzyce

Solna [ˈsɔlna] is a village in the administrative district of Gmina Kobierzyce, within Wrocław County, Lower Silesian Voivodeship, in south-western Poland.
