= Biskupice Podgórne =

- Village
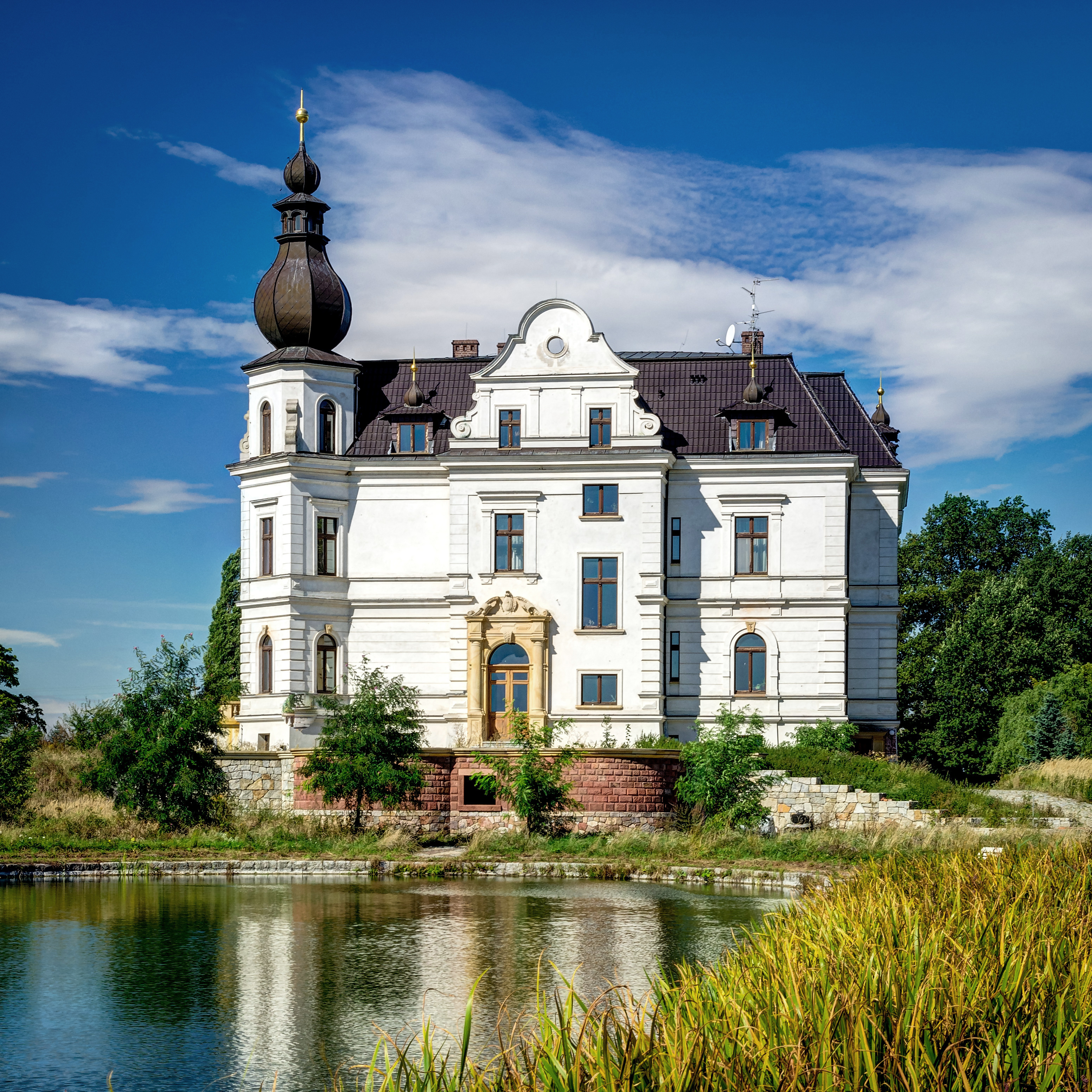

- Location within Poland
- Coordinates: 51°01′54″N 16°53′02″E
- Country: Poland
- Voivodeship: Lower Silesian
- County: Wrocław
- Gmina: Kobierzyce
- Population: 190

Biskupice Podgórne [biskuˈpit͡sɛ pɔdˈɡurnɛ] is a village in the administrative district of Gmina Kobierzyce, within Wrocław County, Lower Silesian Voivodeship, in south-western Poland.
