= Racławice Wielkie =

- Village
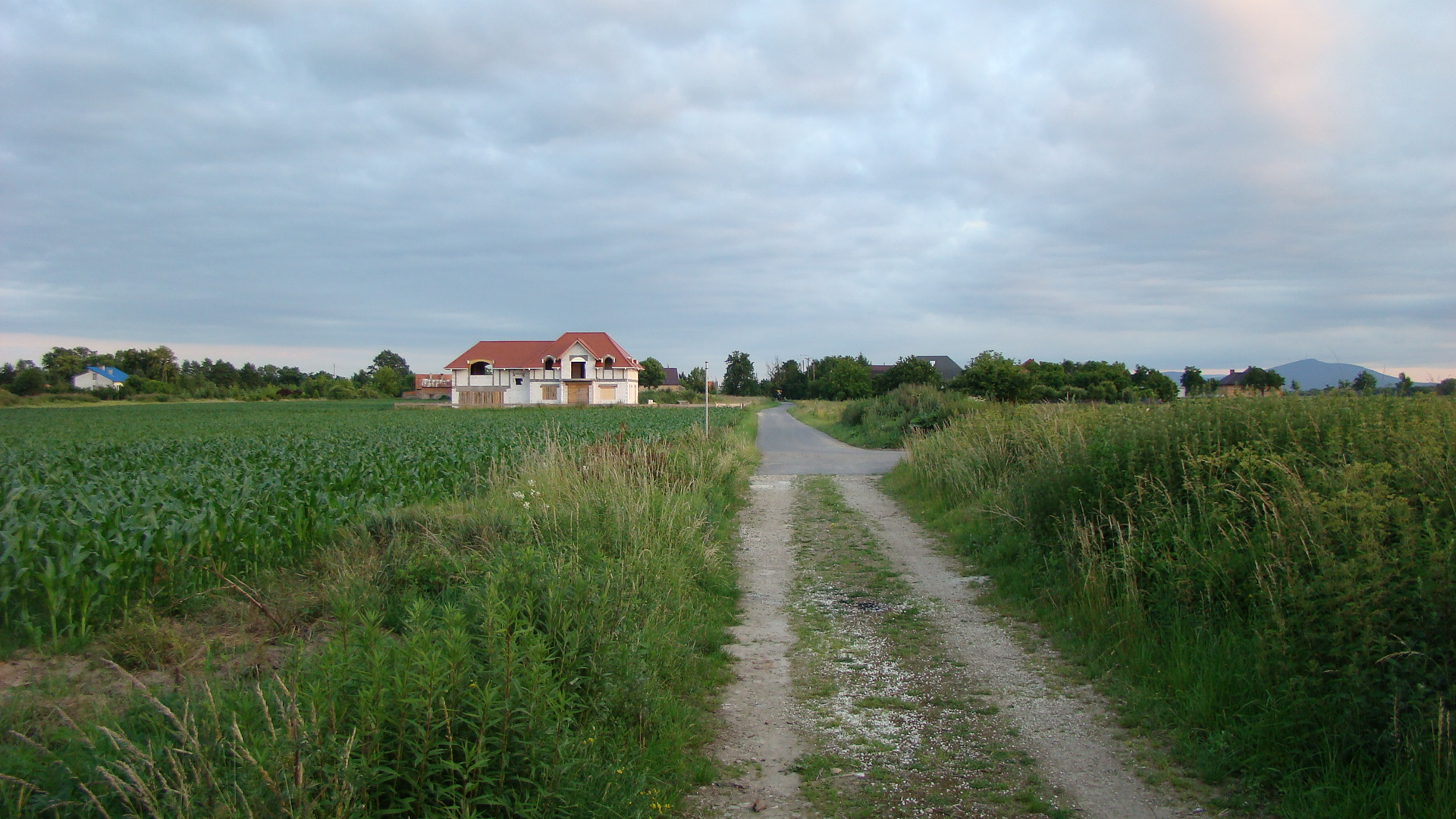
- Street of Racławice Wielkie
- Interactive map of Racławice Wielkie
- Location within Poland
- Coordinates: 50°59′52″N 16°54′49″E
- Country: Poland
- Voivodeship: Lower Silesian
- County: Wrocław
- Gmina: Kobierzyce
- Population (2011): 98
- Post Code: 55-040
- Car plates: DWR

Racławice Wielkie [rat͡swaˈvit͡sɛ ˈvjɛlkʲɛ] is a village in the administrative district of Gmina Kobierzyce, within Wrocław County, Lower Silesian Voivodeship, in south-western Poland.
