= Żurawice =

Żurawice may refer to the following places in Poland:

- Żurawice, Lower Silesian Voivodeship (south-west Poland)
- Żurawice, Kuyavian-Pomeranian Voivodeship (north-central Poland)
