= Rolantowice =

Village in Poland

- Village
- Location within Poland
- Coordinates: 50°55′N 16°54′E
- Country: Poland
- Voivodeship: Lower Silesian
- County: Wrocław
- Gmina: Kobierzyce

Rolantowice [rɔlantɔˈvit͡sɛ] is a village in the administrative district of Gmina Kobierzyce, within Wrocław County, Lower Silesian Voivodeship, in south-western Poland.
