= Wierzbice =

- Village
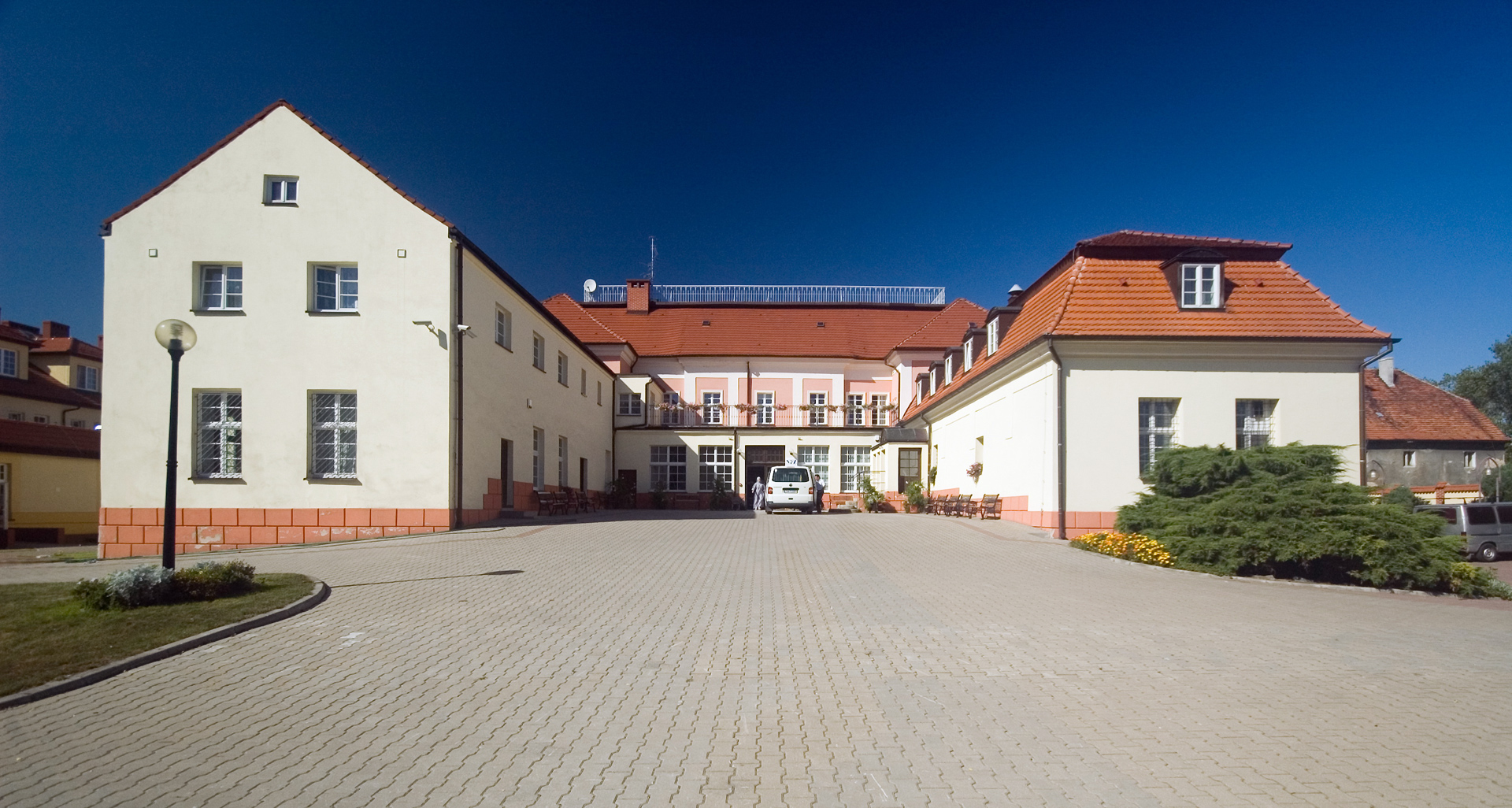
- Palace

- Location within Poland
- Coordinates: 50°57′20″N 16°53′36″E
- Country: Poland
- Voivodeship: Lower Silesian
- County: Wrocław
- Gmina: Kobierzyce
- Population: 680

Wierzbice [vjɛʐˈbit͡sɛ] is a village in the administrative district of Gmina Kobierzyce, within Wrocław County, Lower Silesian Voivodeship, in south-western Poland.
