= Bąki, Lower Silesian Voivodeship =

Bąki
- Village
- Location within Poland
- Coordinates: 50°58′51″N 16°53′09″E
- Country: Poland
- Voivodeship: Lower Silesian
- County: Wrocław
- Gmina: Kobierzyce
- Population: 50

Bąki [ˈbɔŋki] is a village in the administrative district of Gmina Kobierzyce, within Wrocław County, Lower Silesian Voivodeship, in south-western Poland.
