= Kuklice =

- Village
- Location within Poland
- Coordinates: 50°57′N 16°57′E
- Country: Poland
- Voivodeship: Lower Silesian
- County: Wrocław
- Gmina: Kobierzyce
- Time zone: UTC+1 (CET)
  - Summer (DST): UTC+2 (CEST)
- Vehicle registration: DWR

Kuklice [kuˈklit͡sɛ] is a village in the administrative district of Gmina Kobierzyce, within Wrocław County, Lower Silesian Voivodeship, in south-western Poland.

The name of the village is of Polish origin and comes from the word kukułka, which means "cuckoo".
