= Magnice =

- Village
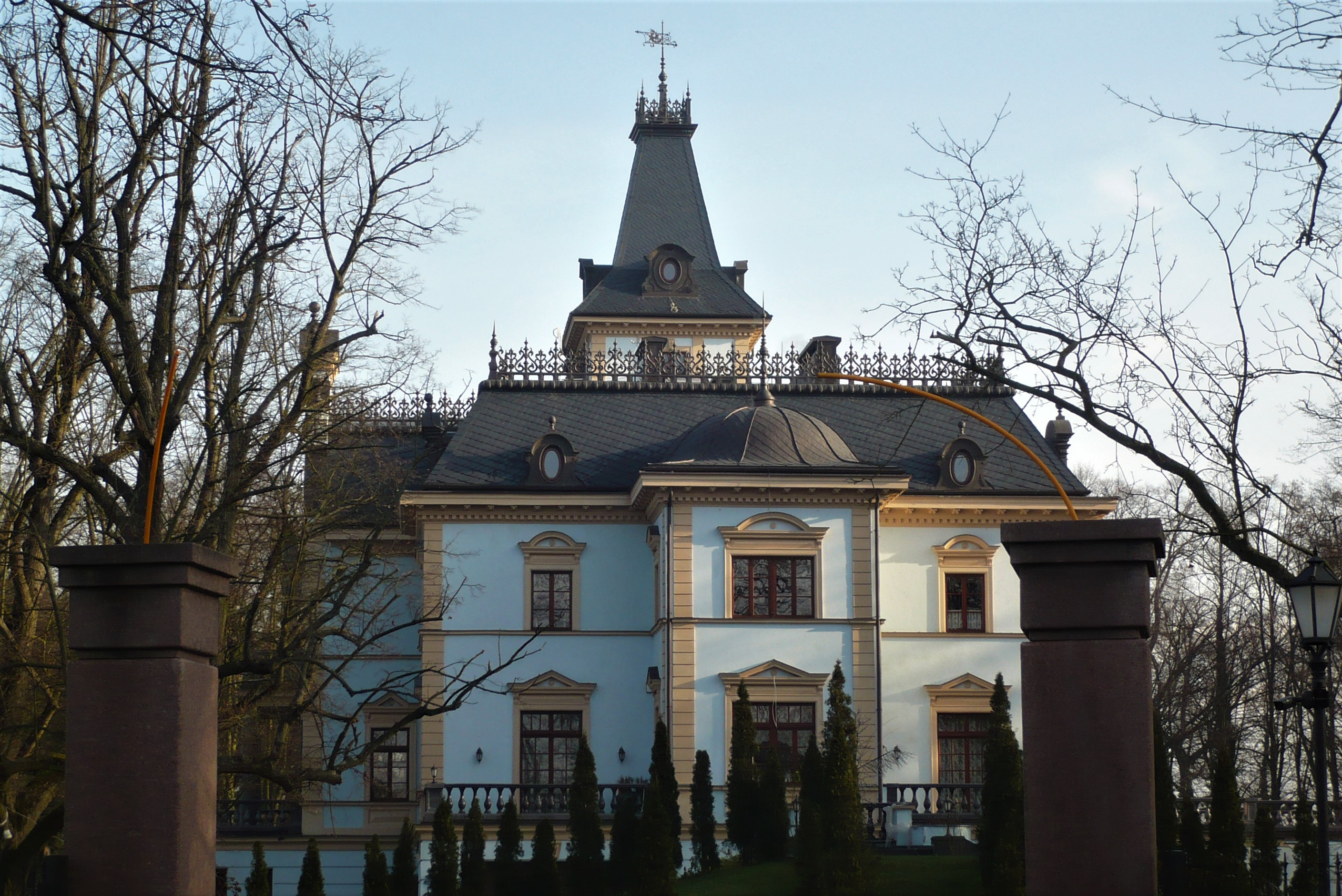
- Palace in Magnice

- Location within Poland
- Coordinates: 50°59′N 16°58′E
- Country: Poland
- Voivodeship: Lower Silesian
- County: Wrocław
- Gmina: Kobierzyce

Population
  - Total: 290

Magnice [maɡˈnit͡sɛ] (German: Magnitz) is a village in the administrative district of Gmina Kobierzyce, within Wrocław County, Lower Silesian Voivodeship, in south-western Poland.
