= Nowiny, Lower Silesian Voivodeship =

Nowiny
- Village
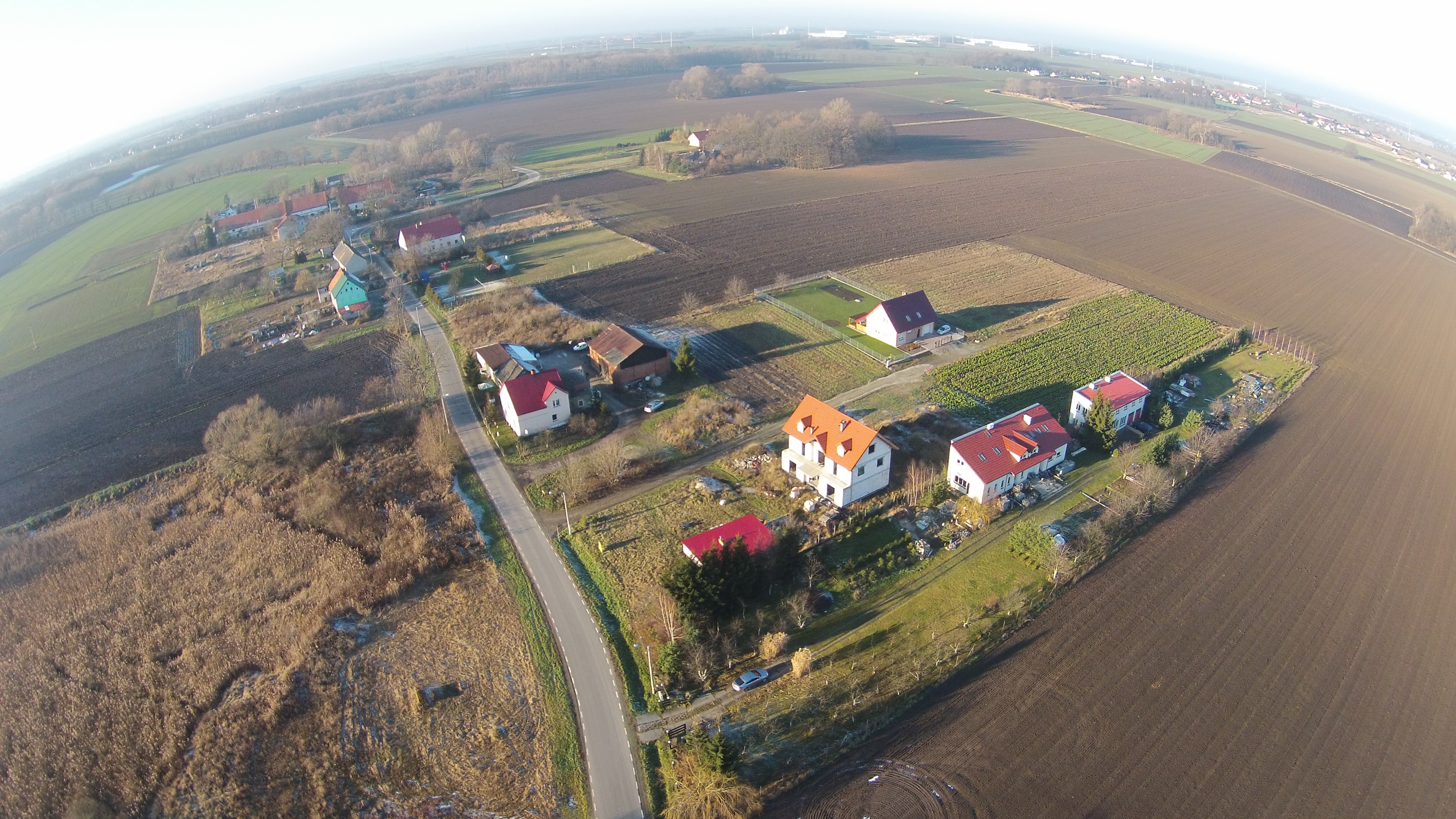

- Location within Poland
- Coordinates: 51°0′N 16°54′E
- Country: Poland
- Voivodeship: Lower Silesian
- County: Wrocław
- Gmina: Kobierzyce

Nowiny [nɔˈvinɨ] is a village in the administrative district of Gmina Kobierzyce, within Wrocław County, Lower Silesian Voivodeship, in south-western Poland.
