= Ślęza, Lower Silesian Voivodeship =

Ślęza
- Village
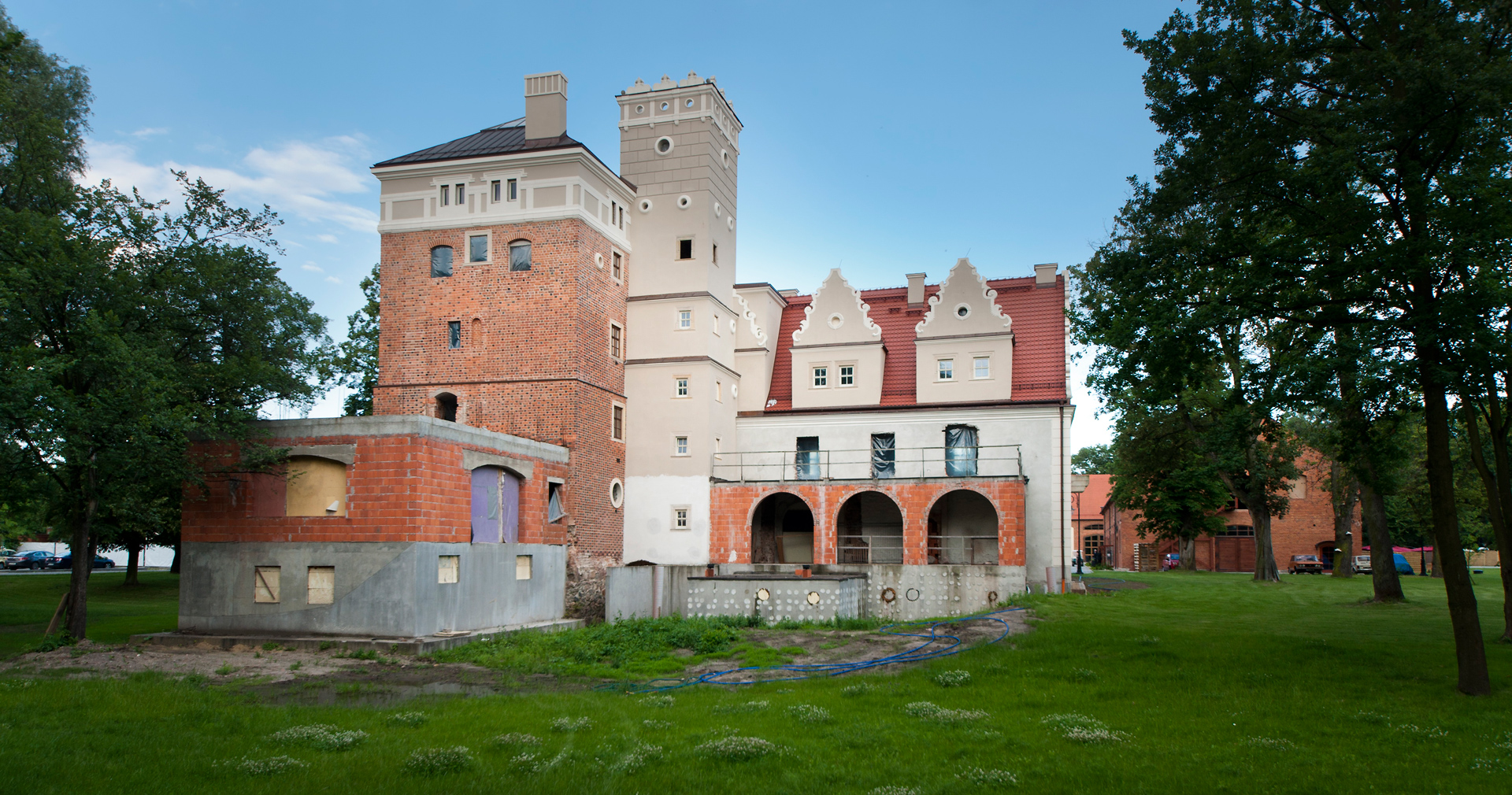
- Manor

- Location within Poland
- Coordinates: 51°02′10″N 16°59′20″E
- Country: Poland
- Voivodeship: Lower Silesian
- County: Wrocław
- Gmina: Kobierzyce
- Elevation: 125 m (410 ft)

Ślęza (Polish: [ˈɕlɛ̃za]) is a village in the administrative district of Gmina Kobierzyce, within Wrocław County, Lower Silesian Voivodeship, in southwestern Poland.
