= Szczepankowice =

- Village
- Location within Poland
- Coordinates: 50°56′N 16°54′E
- Country: Poland
- Voivodeship: Lower Silesian
- County: Wrocław
- Gmina: Kobierzyce

Population
  - Total: 320
- Time zone: UTC+1 (CET)
  - Summer (DST): UTC+2 (CEST)
- Vehicle registration: DWR

Szczepankowice [ʂt͡ʂɛpaŋkɔˈvit͡sɛ] is a village in the administrative district of Gmina Kobierzyce, within Wrocław County, Lower Silesian Voivodeship, in south-western Poland.

== Etymology ==
The name of the village comes from the Polish masculine given name Szczepan.
