= Chrzanów, Lower Silesian Voivodeship =

Chrzanów
- Village
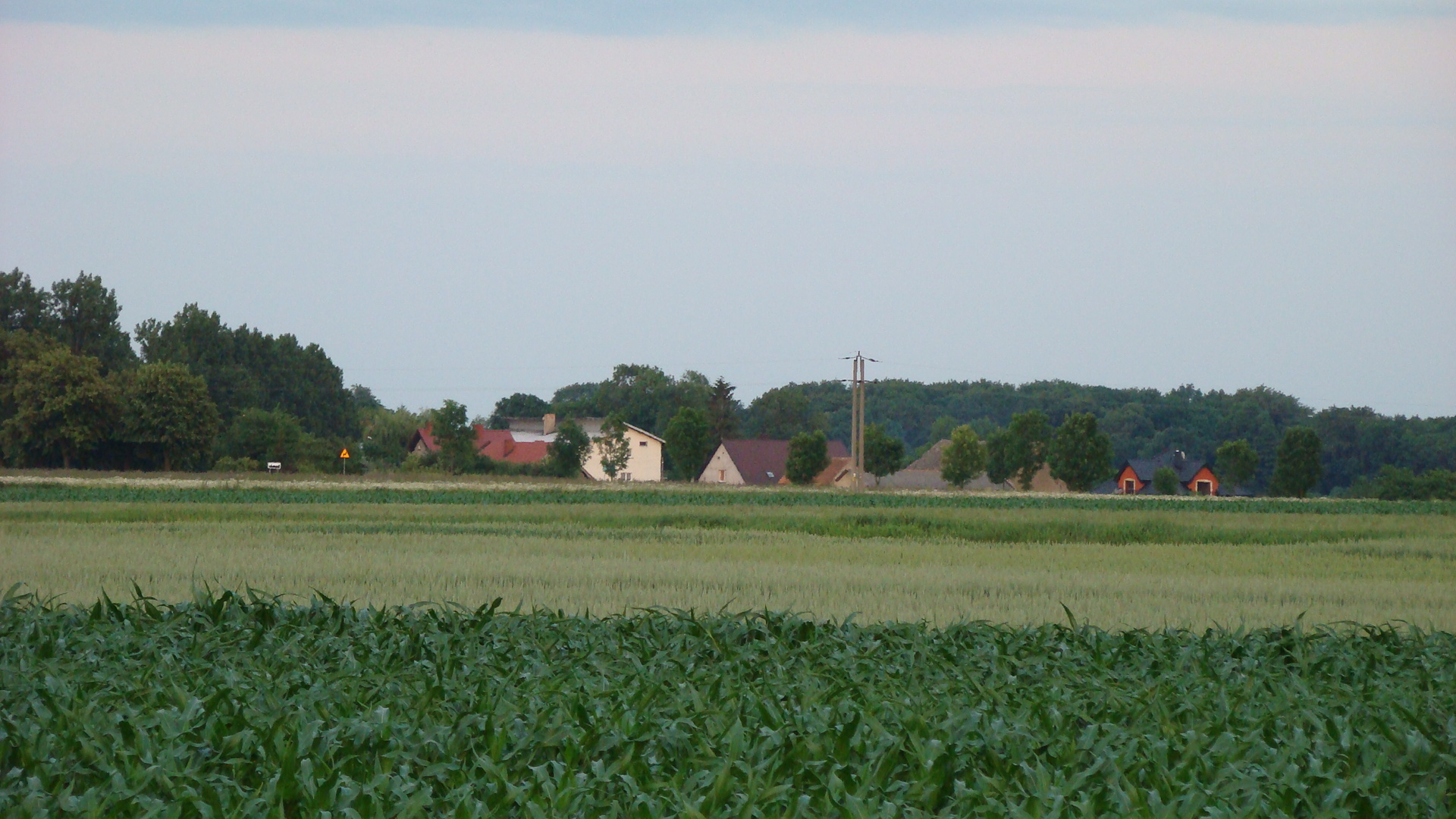

- Location within Poland
- Coordinates: 50°59′35″N 16°55′54″E
- Country: Poland
- Voivodeship: Lower Silesian
- County: Wrocław
- Gmina: Kobierzyce

Chrzanów [ˈxʂanuf] is a village in the administrative district of Gmina Kobierzyce, within Wrocław County, Lower Silesian Voivodeship, in south-western Poland.
