= Małuszów, Wrocław County =

Małuszów
- Village
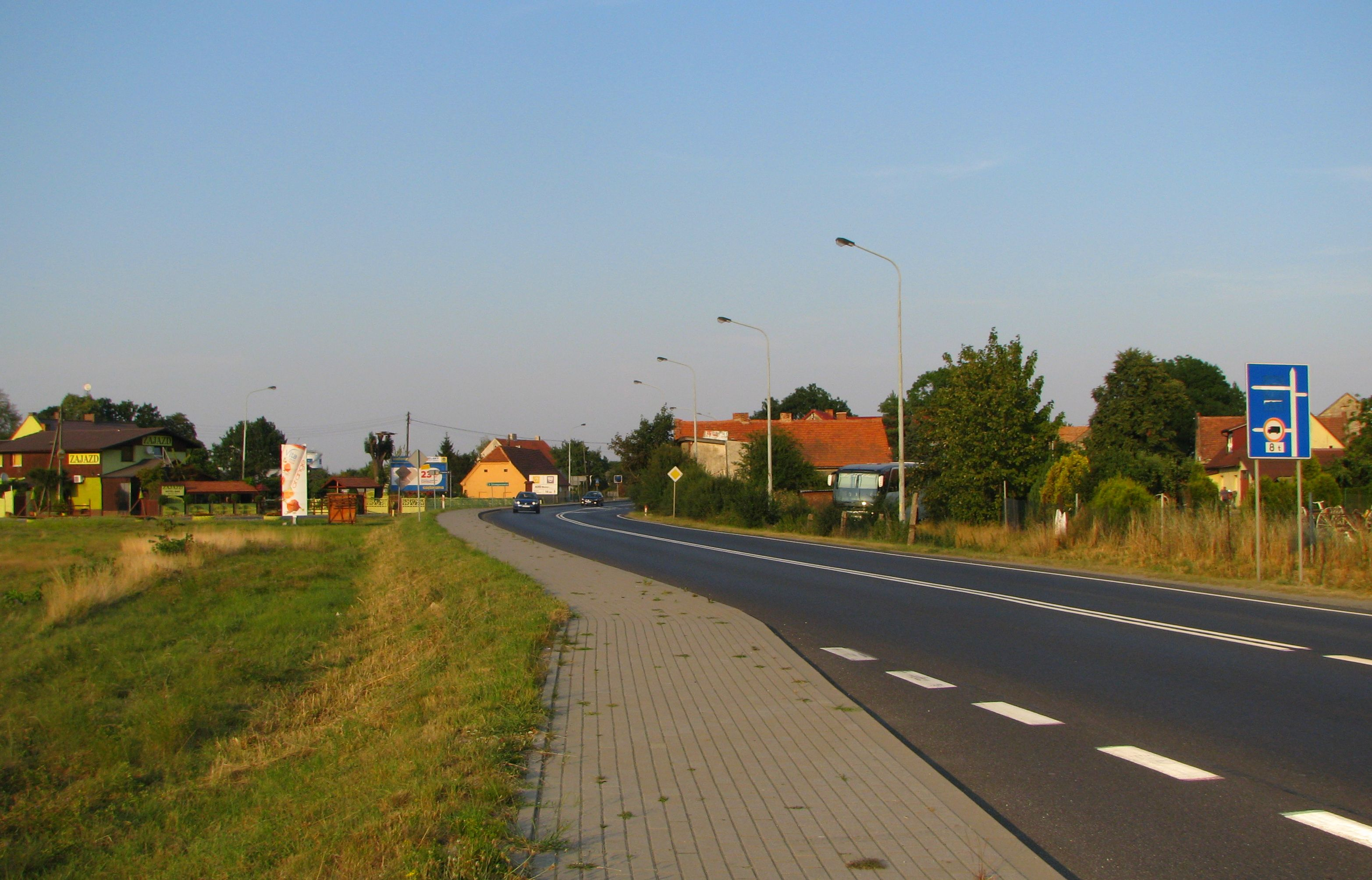

- Location within Poland
- Coordinates: 51°00′41″N 16°52′20″E
- Country: Poland
- Voivodeship: Lower Silesian
- County: Wrocław
- Gmina: Kobierzyce

Małuszów [maˈwuʂuf] is a village in the administrative district of Gmina Kobierzyce, within Wrocław County, Lower Silesian Voivodeship, in south-western Poland.
