= Wysoka, Wrocław County =

Wysoka
- Village
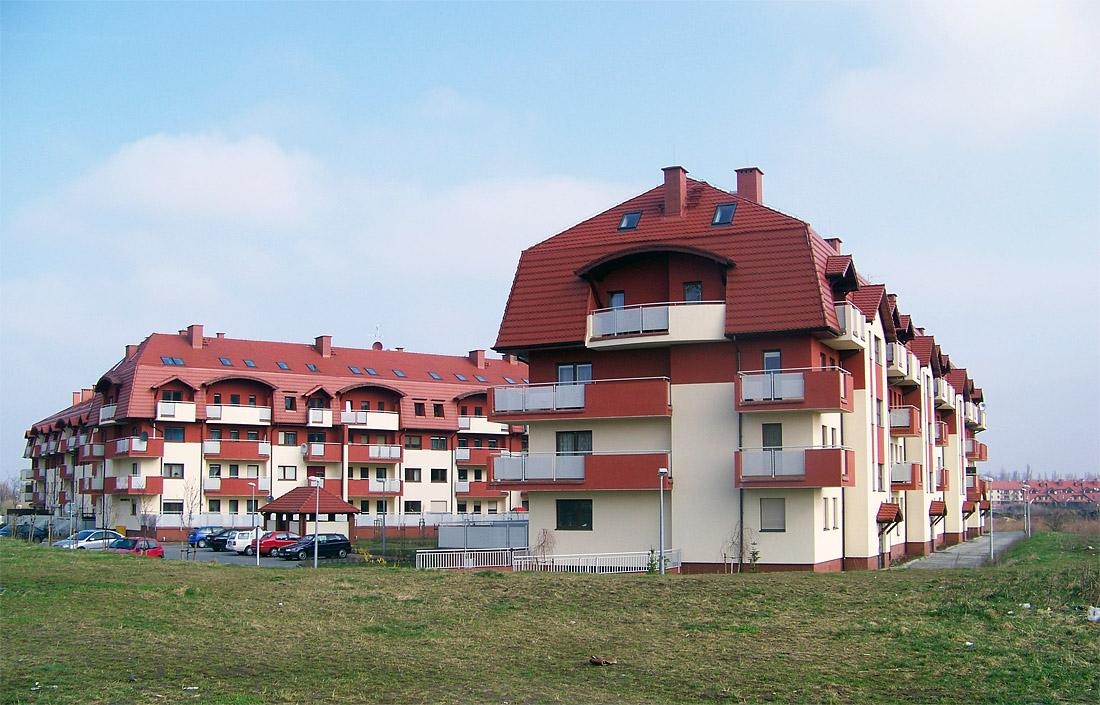

- Location within Poland
- Coordinates: 51°2′45″N 17°0′30″E
- Country: Poland
- Voivodeship: Lower Silesian
- County: Wrocław
- Gmina: Kobierzyce

Population
  - Total: 1,036
- Time zone: UTC+1 (CET)
  - Summer (DST): UTC+2 (CEST)
- ISO 3166 code: POL
- Vehicle registration: DWR

Wysoka [vɨˈsɔka] is a village in the administrative district of Gmina Kobierzyce, within Wrocław County, Lower Silesian Voivodeship, in south-western Poland. It is a southern suburb of Wrocław.

The name of the village is of Polish origin and comes from the word wysoka, which means "high", referring to the elevation of the village.
