= Damianowice =

- Village
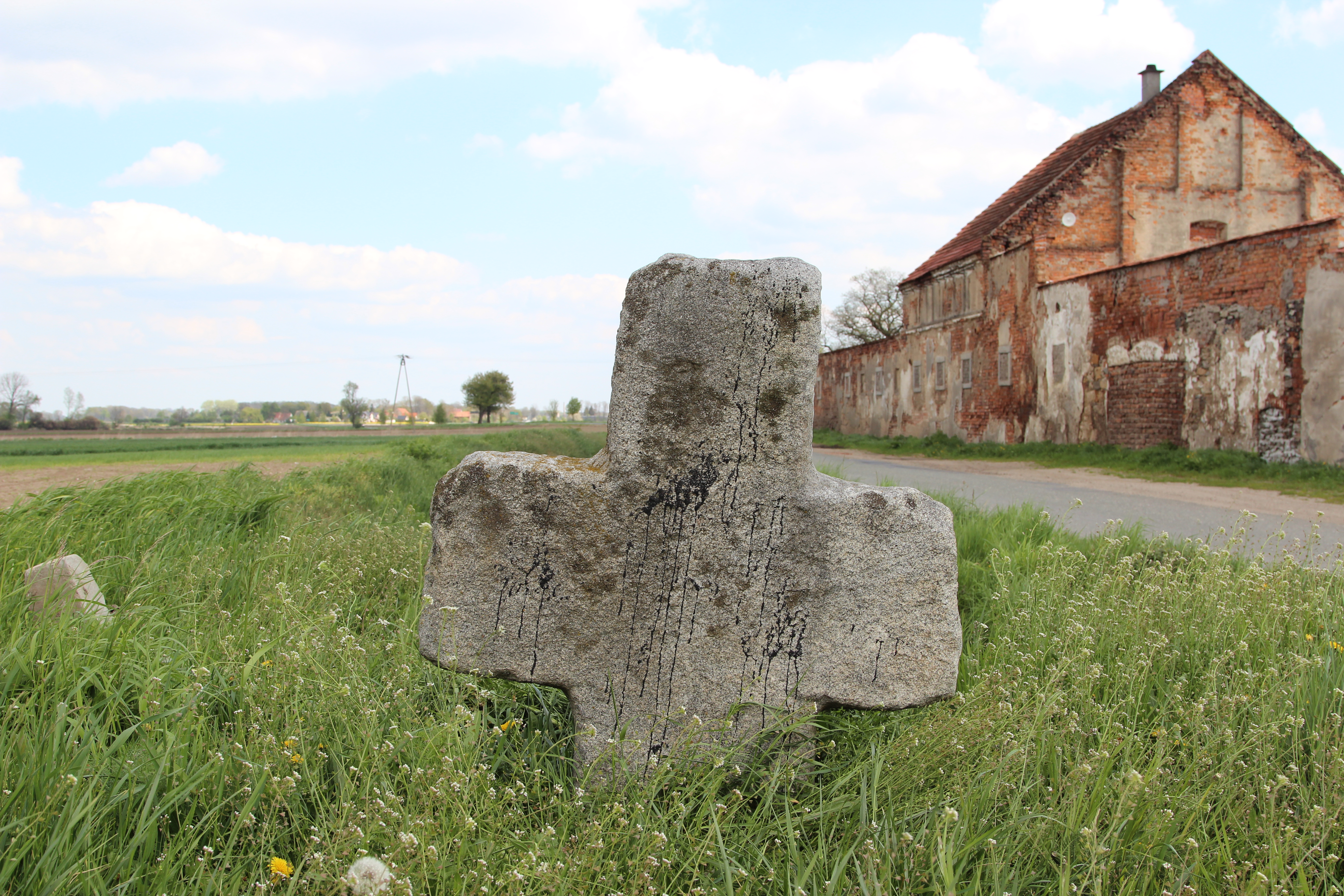
- Stone cross

- Location within Poland
- Coordinates: 50°55′N 16°51′E
- Country: Poland
- Voivodeship: Lower Silesian
- County: Wrocław
- Gmina: Kobierzyce
- Population: 92

Damianowice [damjanɔˈvit͡sɛ] is a village in the administrative district of Gmina Kobierzyce, within Wrocław County, Lower Silesian Voivodeship, in south-western Poland.
