= Księginice, Wrocław County =

Księginice
- Village
- Location within Poland
- Coordinates: 50°59′49″N 16°58′59″E
- Country: Poland
- Voivodeship: Lower Silesian
- County: Wrocław
- Gmina: Kobierzyce
- Population: 120

Księginice [kɕɛnɡiˈnit͡sɛ] is a village in the administrative district of Gmina Kobierzyce, within Wrocław County, Lower Silesian Voivodeship, in south-western Poland.
