= Tyniec Mały =

- Village
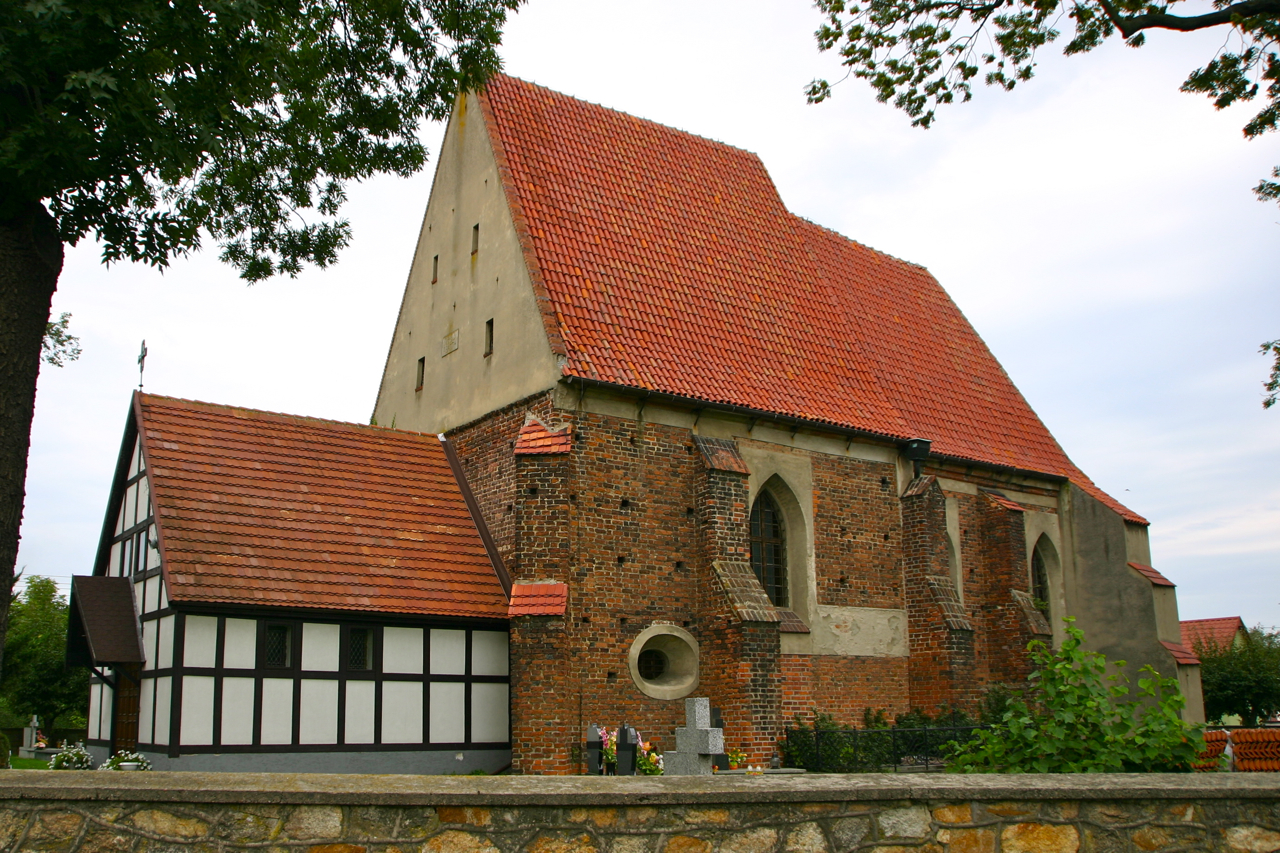
- Church of the Assumption in Tyniec Mały

- Location within Poland
- Coordinates: 51°2′N 16°55′E
- Country: Poland
- Voivodeship: Lower Silesian
- County: Wrocław
- Gmina: Kobierzyce
- Population: 1,602 (2,008)
- Time zone: UTC+1 (CET)
  - Summer (DST): UTC+2 (CEST)
- Website: http://www.tyniec-maly.pl/

Tyniec Mały [ˈtɨɲɛt͡s ˈmawɨ] is a village in the administrative district of Gmina Kobierzyce, within Wrocław County, Lower Silesian Voivodeship, in south-western Poland.

On 24 January 1945, 51 prisoners who were shot or died of exhaustion and cold during the "death march" from the subcamp in Miłoszyce to the Gross-Rosen concentration camp were buried in the village. There is a memorial at the site.

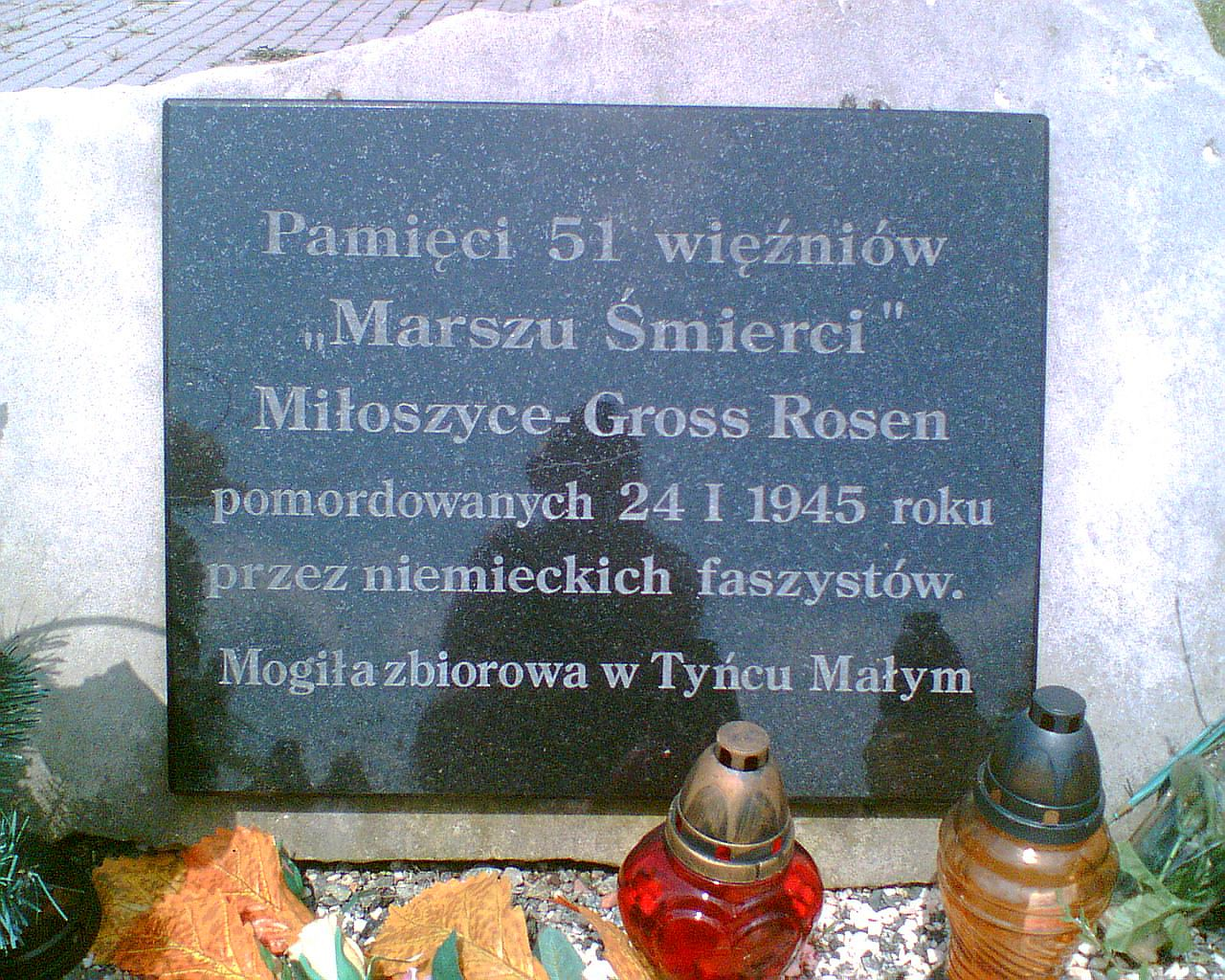
Memorial at the mass grave of 51 victims of the "death march"

== Sights and monuments ==
- Gothic Church of the Assumption
- Gothic wayside shrine
- Memorial at the site of a mass grave of 51 prisoners murdered by the Germans during the "death march" on 24 January 1945
