= Żerniki Małe =

- Village
- Location within Poland
- Coordinates: 51°0′11″N 16°54′27″E
- Country: Poland
- Voivodeship: Lower Silesian
- County: Wrocław
- Gmina: Kobierzyce

Żerniki Małe (Polish pronunciation: [ʐɛrˈɲikʲi ˈmawɛ]) is a village in the administrative district of Gmina Kobierzyce, within Wrocław County, Lower Silesian Voivodeship, in south-western Poland.
