= Pustków Wilczkowski =

- Village
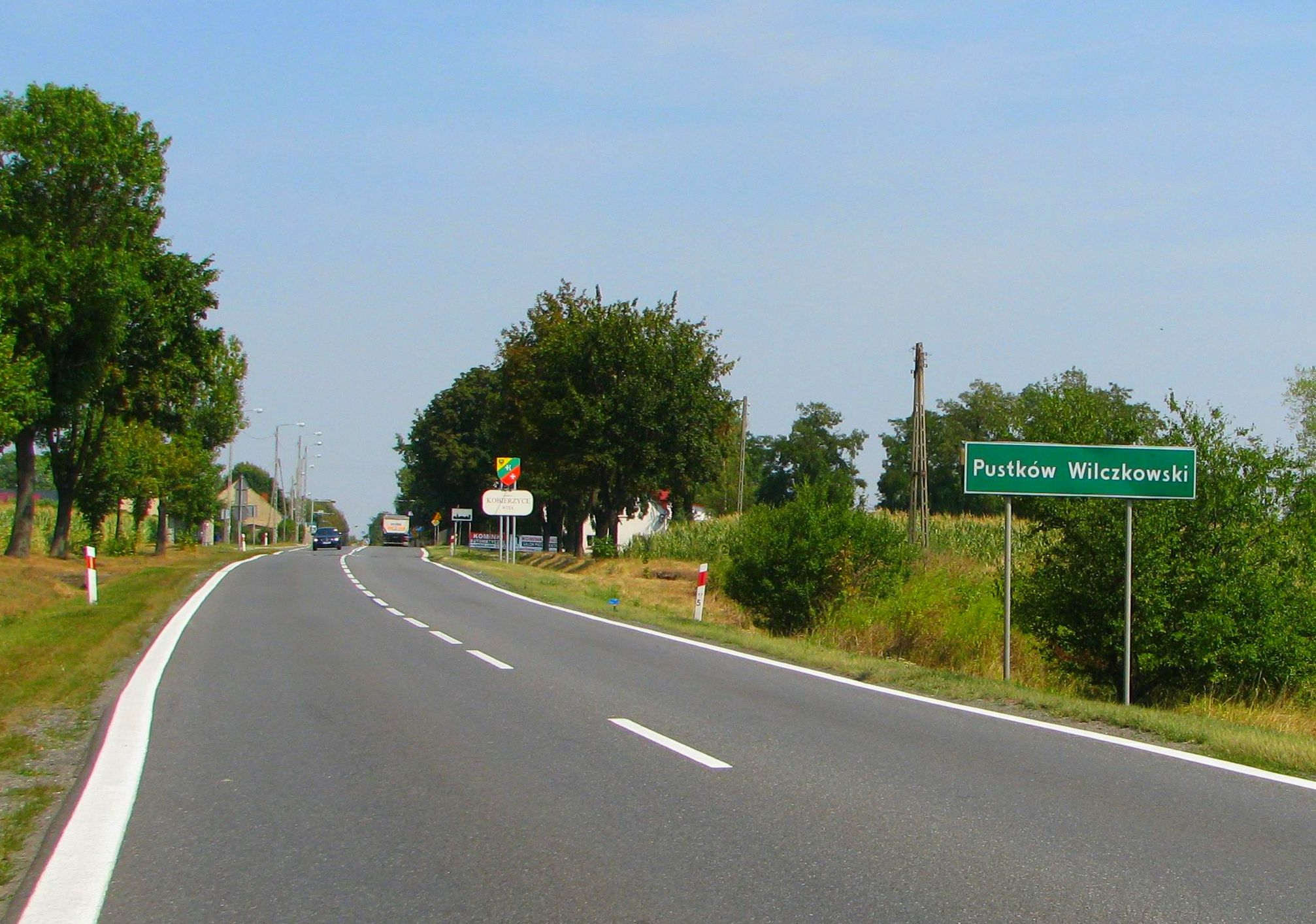

- Location within Poland
- Coordinates: 50°54′9″N 16°53′0″E
- Country: Poland
- Voivodeship: Lower Silesian
- County: Wrocław
- Gmina: Kobierzyce

Pustków Wilczkowski [ˈpustkuf vilt͡ʂˈkɔfski] is a village in the administrative district of Gmina Kobierzyce, within Wrocław County, Lower Silesian Voivodeship, in south-western Poland.
