= Pełczyce, Wrocław County =

Pełczyce
- Village
- Location within Poland
- Coordinates: 50°57′55″N 16°57′35″E
- Country: Poland
- Voivodeship: Lower Silesian
- County: Wrocław
- Gmina: Kobierzyce
- Population: 285 (2,015)

Pełczyce [pɛu̯ˈt͡ʂɨt͡sɛ] is a village in the administrative district of Gmina Kobierzyce, within Wrocław County, Lower Silesian Voivodeship, in south-western Poland.
