= Pustków Żurawski =

- Village
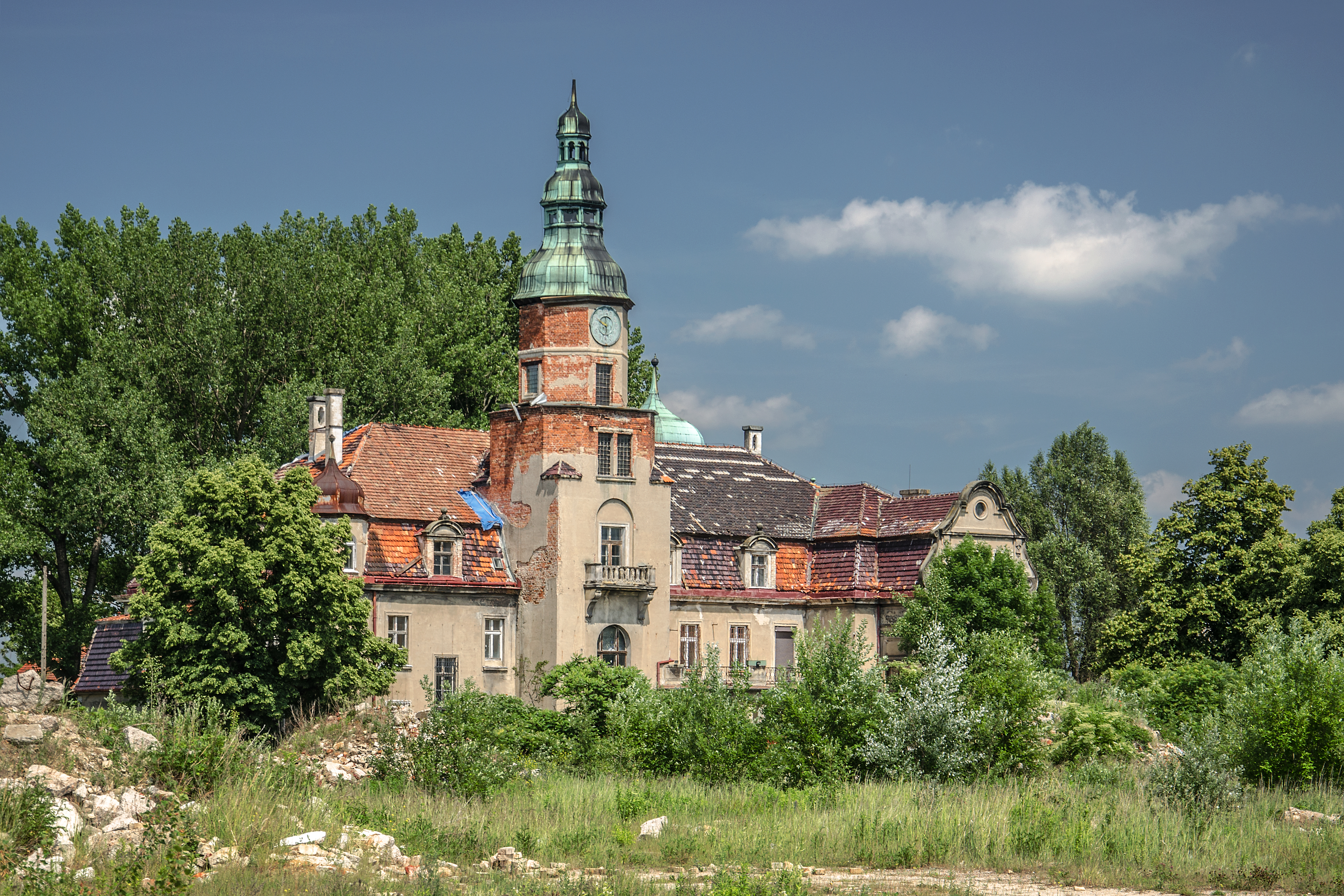
- Palace in the village

- Location within Poland
- Coordinates: 50°57′34″N 16°51′58″E
- Country: Poland
- Voivodeship: Lower Silesian
- County: Wrocław
- Gmina: Kobierzyce

Population
  - Total: 919

Pustków Żurawski [ˈpustkuf ʐuˈrafski] is a village in the administrative district of Gmina Kobierzyce, within Wrocław County, Lower Silesian Voivodeship, in south-western Poland.
