= Krzyżowice, Lower Silesian Voivodeship =

Krzyżowice
- Village
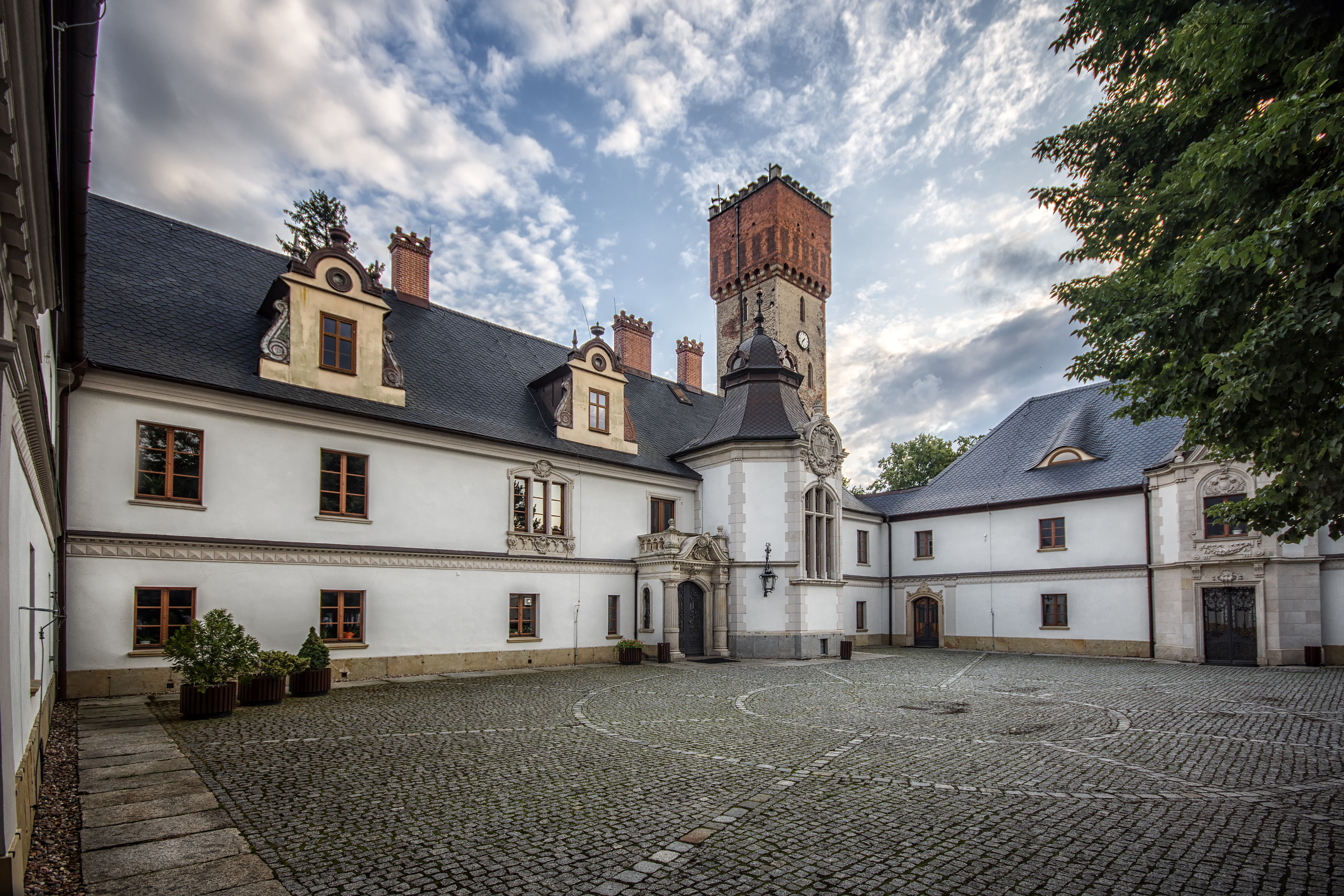
- Palace in the village

- Location within Poland
- Coordinates: 50°59′42″N 16°52′38″E
- Country: Poland
- Voivodeship: Lower Silesian
- County: Wrocław
- Gmina: Kobierzyce

Krzyżowice [kʂɨʐɔˈvit͡sɛ] (German: Schlanz) is a village in the administrative district of Gmina Kobierzyce, within Wrocław County, Lower Silesian Voivodeship, in south-western Poland.
