= Kobierzyce =

- Village
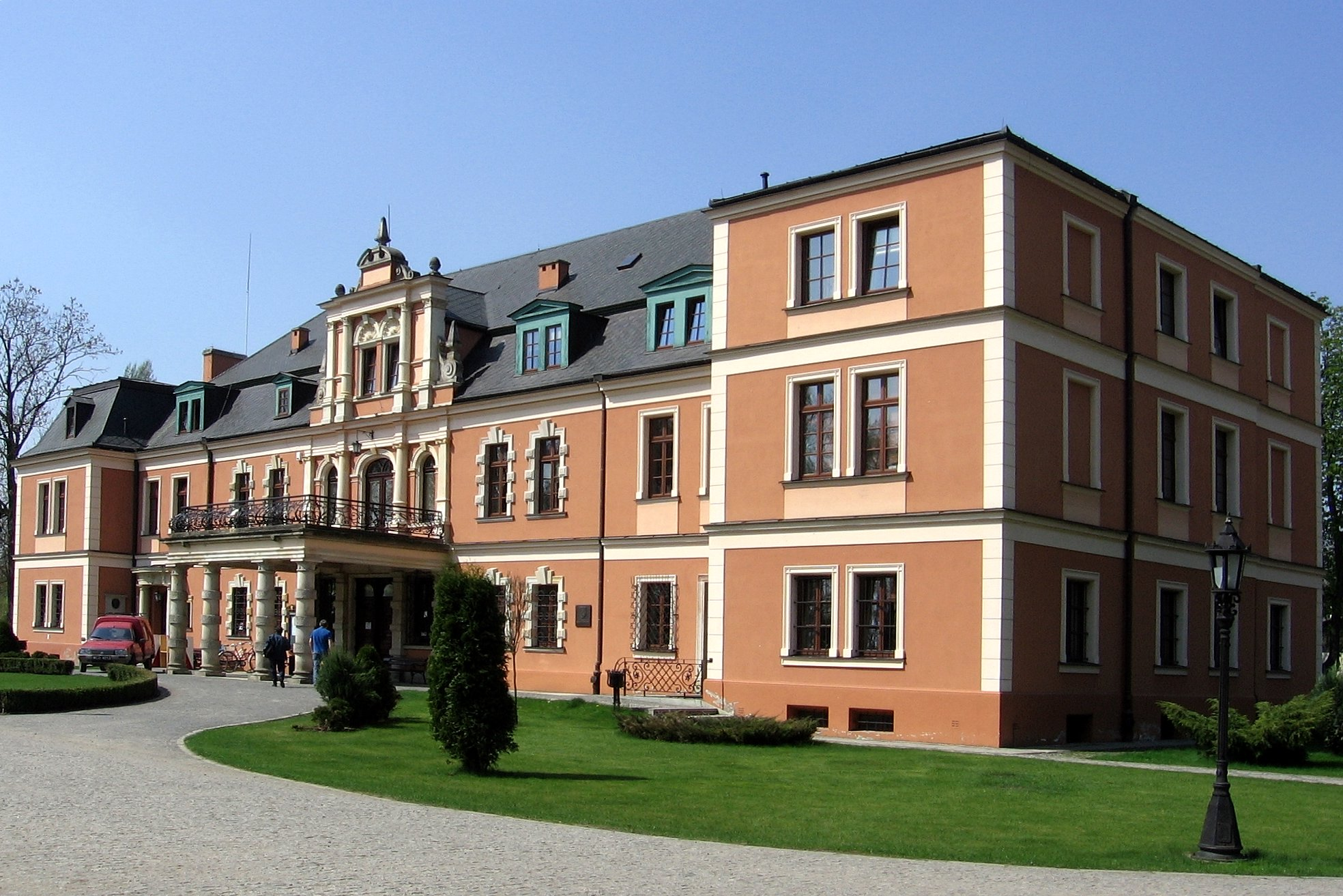
- Palace in Kobierzyce

- Location within Poland
- Coordinates: 50°58′N 16°55′E
- Country: Poland
- Voivodeship: Lower Silesian
- County: Wrocław
- Gmina: Kobierzyce
- First mentioned: 1257

Population
  - Total: 2,095
- Time zone: UTC+1 (CET)
  - Summer (DST): UTC+2 (CEST)
- Vehicle registration: DWR
- Website: www.ugk.pl

Kobierzyce [kɔbjɛˈʐɨt͡sɛ] (German: Koberwitz) is a village in Wrocław County, Lower Silesian Voivodeship, in south-western Poland. It is the seat of the administrative district (gmina) called Gmina Kobierzyce.

== History ==
The oldest known mention of the village comes from a document of Duke Henry III the White from 1257, when it was part of fragmented Piast-ruled Poland. Its name is of Polish origin, and comes from the word kobierzec, referring to its role as a center of weaving.

It was the location for Rudolf Steiner's Agriculture Course in 1924. It was a course of eight lectures, there were 111 attendees from six countries, it led to the development of biodynamic agriculture, and it has been described as "the first organic agriculture course".

== Transport ==
There is a train station in the village.

== Sports ==
The village is home to KPR Kobierzyce, women's handball club, which competes in the Polish Women's Superliga, the country's top division.
