= Vitaliy Zhuravskyi =

Ukrainian politician (born 1955)

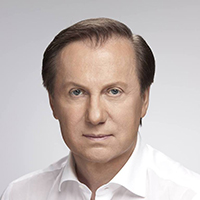
Vitaly Zhuravsky

Vitaly Stanislavovych Zhuravsky (Ukrainian: Віталій Станіславович Журавський; born May 8, 1955) is a Ukrainian politician. He served as a People's Deputy of Ukraine in the Verkhovna Rada from 1998 to 2002 and from 2012 to 2014 as a member of the Party of Regions from the Zhytomyr region.

== Early life ==
Zhuravskyi was born on 8 May 1955 in the village of Khoroshiv, which was then part of the Ukrainian SSR in the Soviet Union. In 1980, he graduated from the University of Kyiv, and afterwords started working as a journalist for Mashinostroitelnyk until 1988. During this, he completed his Candidate of Philosophical Sciences also. Then, from 1988 until the collapse of the Soviet Union, he worked at the Kyiv Technological Institute of Light Industry. After its collapse, he started working as a Prorector for Research at the Ukrainian Financial Institute of Management and Business in Kyiv until 1998. He also achieved a higher doctorate, a Doctor of Sciences, focusing on political science in 1996.

After briefly working as a professor and obtaining another higher doctorate, this time in jurdicial sciences, he worked as a senior and leading researcher at the Institute of State and Law for the National Academy of Sciences of Ukraine until 2006.

== Political career ==
In 1992, he founded the Christian Democratic Party of Ukraine. During the 1998 Ukrainian parliamentary election, he was elected to the Verkhovna Rada, initially as a member of the NDP faction, until 2001 when he joined the Party of Regions faction. He served as a deputy for his first term until 2002. In 2002, he was appointed a State Secretary within the Ministry of Education and Sciences, which he did for a year until being promoted to First Deputy Minister, which he did until 2005. He was then Deputy Head then Head of the Main Directorate of Education for the Kyiv Cityy State Administration until 2012. He was re-elected during the 2012 Ukrainian parliamentary election to the Verkhovna Rada, as a member of the Party of Regions.

He authored the draft law on defamation in 2012. The law would have introduced criminal liability for defamation to the Criminal Code, which critics stated would have significantly restricted freedom of speech. The law was withdrawn due to the controversy surrounding it after a 349–0 vote canceled its first reading, which then Secretary General of the Council of Europe, Thorbjørn Jagland, welcomed as he stated it interfered with freedom of expression. On 27 February 2014, after the events of Euromaidan, he left the Party of Regions for the remainder of his term as an MP and joined Economic Development, which was led by Anatoliy Kinakh.

On September 16, 2014, a video circulated online purporting to show Zhuravsky being thrown into a garbage bin by an angry mob outside of the parliament buildings.

== Post-political career ==
After 2014, he started working as the Head of the Methodology Sector of the Institute of Legislation of the Verkhovna Rada, which he did until 2022. In 2022, he was appointed a professor at Kyiv International University.
