= Królikowice, Lower Silesian Voivodeship =

Królikowice
- Village
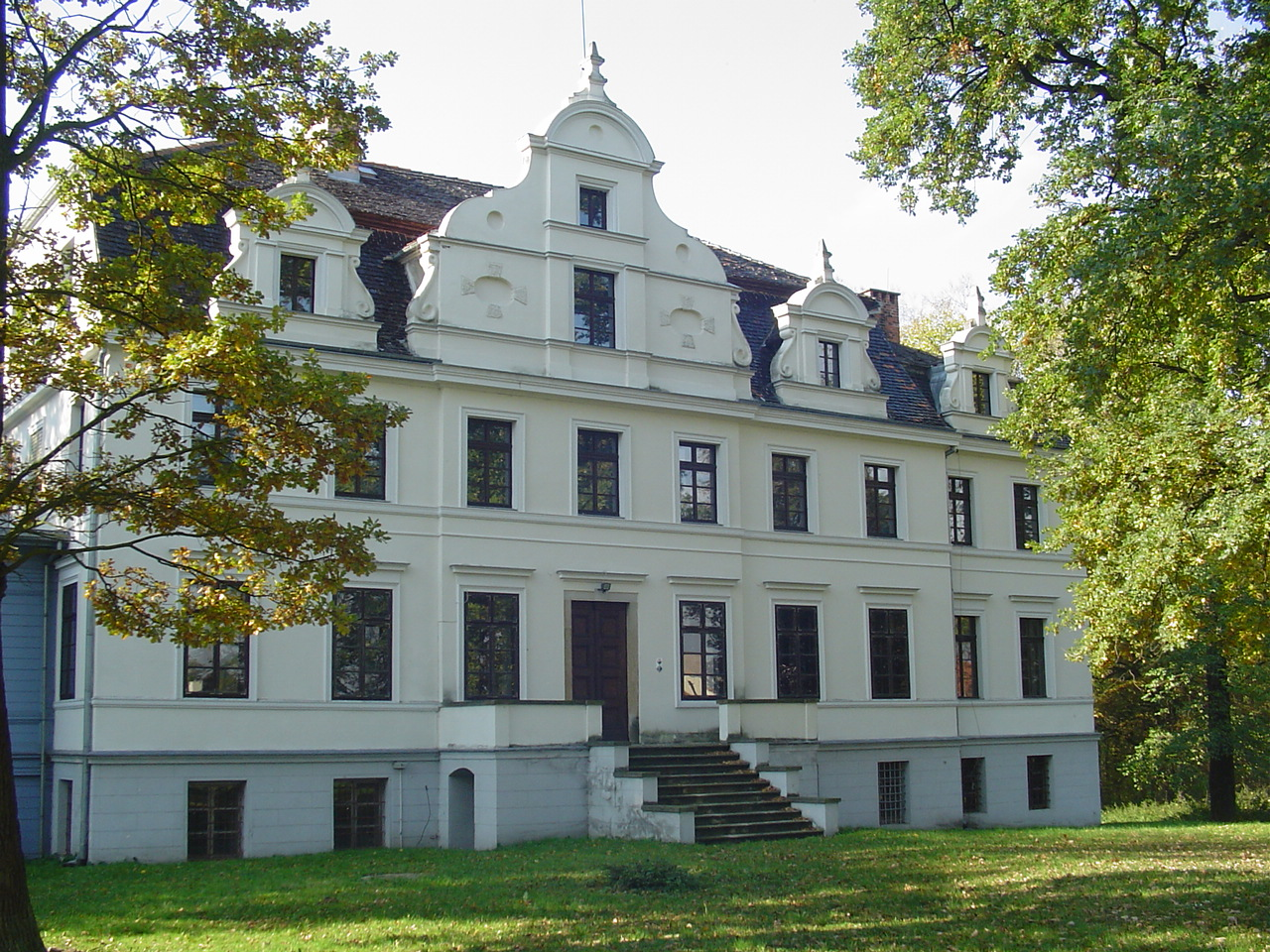
- Manor

- Location within Poland
- Coordinates: 50°58′00″N 16°55′00″E
- Country: Poland
- Voivodeship: Lower Silesian
- County: Wrocław
- Gmina: Kobierzyce
- Population: 319

Królikowice [krulikɔˈvit͡sɛ] is a village in the administrative district of Gmina Kobierzyce, within Wrocław County, Lower Silesian Voivodeship, in south-western Poland.
