= Andrzej Żurawski =

Polish ice hockey player

- Born: September 6, 1940 (age 84); Toruń, Nazi Germany
- Height: 5 ft 9 in (175 cm)
- Weight: 165 lb (75 kg; 11 st 11 lb)
- Position: Forward
- Played for: Pomorzanin Toruń
- National team: Poland
- Playing career: 1954–1974

Andrzej Jerzy Żurawski (born 6 September 1940) is a Polish former ice hockey player. He played for Pomorzanin Toruń during his career. He also played for the Polish national team at the 1964 Winter Olympics and the 1986 and four World Championships.
