= Budziszów, Wrocław County =

Budziszów
- Village
- Location within Poland
- Coordinates: 50°55′21″N 16°55′10″E
- Country: Poland
- Voivodeship: Lower Silesian
- County: Wrocław
- Gmina: Kobierzyce

Budziszów [buˈd͡ʑiʂuf] is a village in the administrative district of Gmina Kobierzyce, within Wrocław County, Lower Silesian Voivodeship, in south-western Poland.
