= Domasław, Lower Silesian Voivodeship =

Domasław
- Village
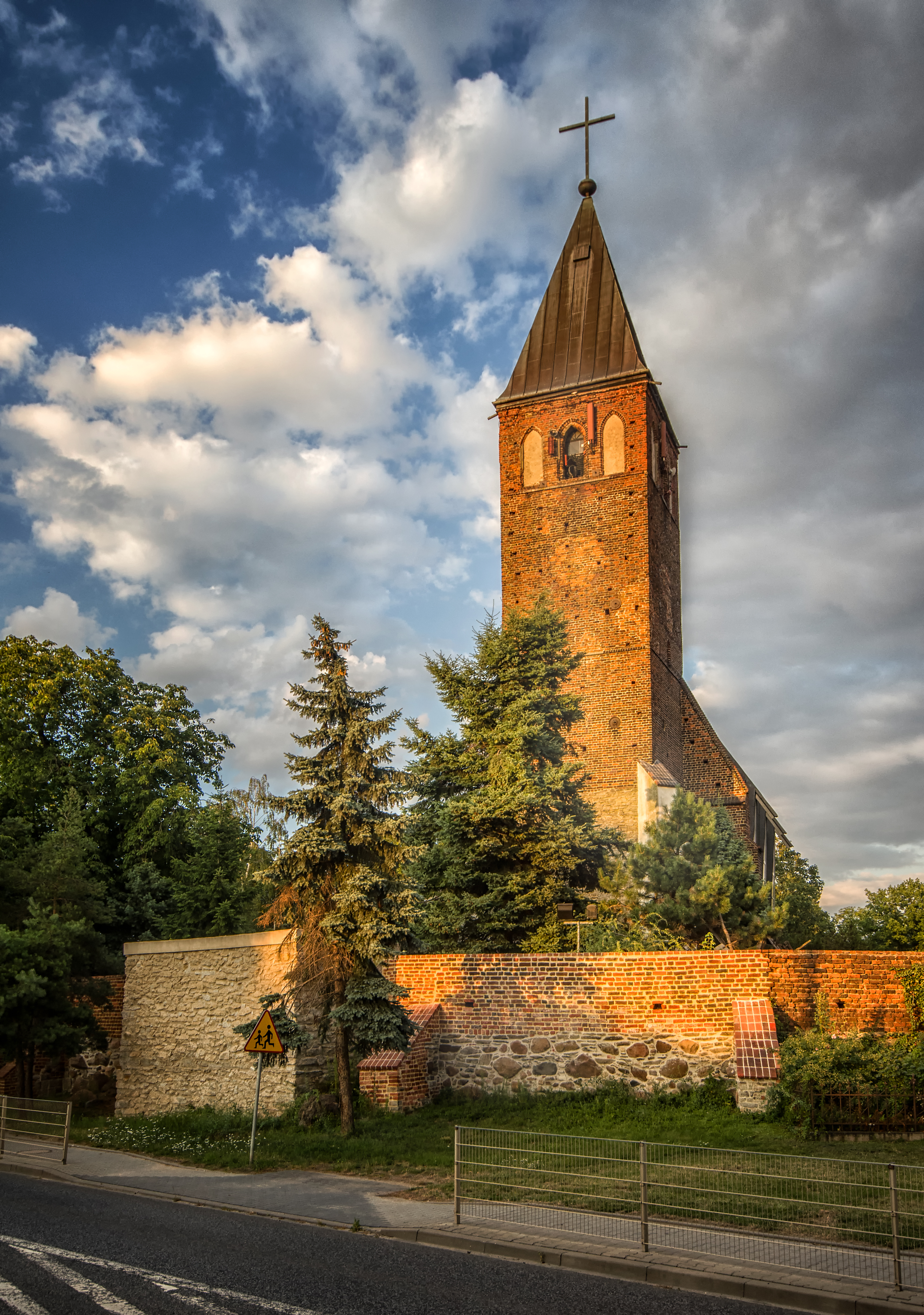
- Catholic church

- Location within Poland
- Coordinates: 51°00′39″N 16°57′20″E
- Country: Poland
- Voivodeship: Lower Silesian
- County: Wrocław
- Gmina: Kobierzyce
- Population (approx.): 729

Domasław [dɔˈmaswaf] is a village in the administrative district of Gmina Kobierzyce, within Wrocław County, Lower Silesian Voivodeship, in south-western Poland.
