= Dobkowice, Lower Silesian Voivodeship =

Dobkowice
- Village
- Location within Poland
- Coordinates: 50°55′29″N 16°52′22″E
- Country: Poland
- Voivodeship: Lower Silesian
- County: Wrocław
- Gmina: Kobierzyce
- Population: 110

Dobkowice [dɔpkɔˈvit͡sɛ] is a village in the administrative district of Gmina Kobierzyce, within Wrocław County, Lower Silesian Voivodeship, in south-western Poland.
