= Cieszyce, Lower Silesian Voivodeship =

Cieszyce
- Village
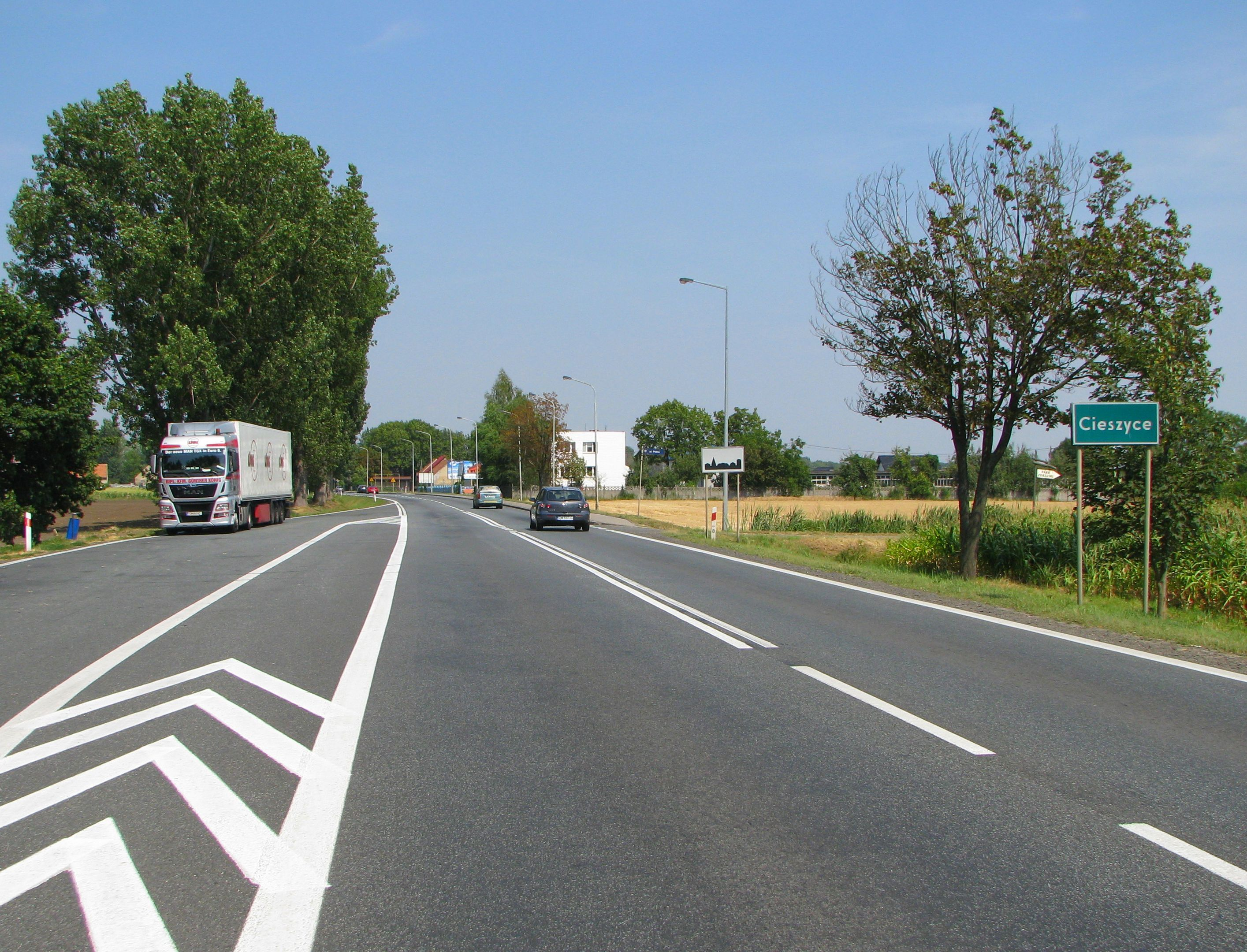

- Location within Poland
- Coordinates: 50°57′N 16°54′E
- Country: Poland
- Voivodeship: Lower Silesian
- County: Wrocław
- Gmina: Kobierzyce
- Population (approx.): 230

Cieszyce [t͡ɕɛˈʂɨt͡sɛ] is a village in the administrative district of Gmina Kobierzyce, within Wrocław County, Lower Silesian Voivodeship, in south-western Poland.
