= Owsianka, Lower Silesian Voivodeship =

Owsianka
- Village
- Location within Poland
- Coordinates: 50°58′38″N 16°51′59″E
- Country: Poland
- Voivodeship: Lower Silesian
- County: Wrocław
- Gmina: Kobierzyce

Owsianka [ɔfˈɕaŋka] is a village in the administrative district of Gmina Kobierzyce, within Wrocław County, Lower Silesian Voivodeship, in south-western Poland.
