= Krzyżowice, Głubczyce County =

Krzyżowice
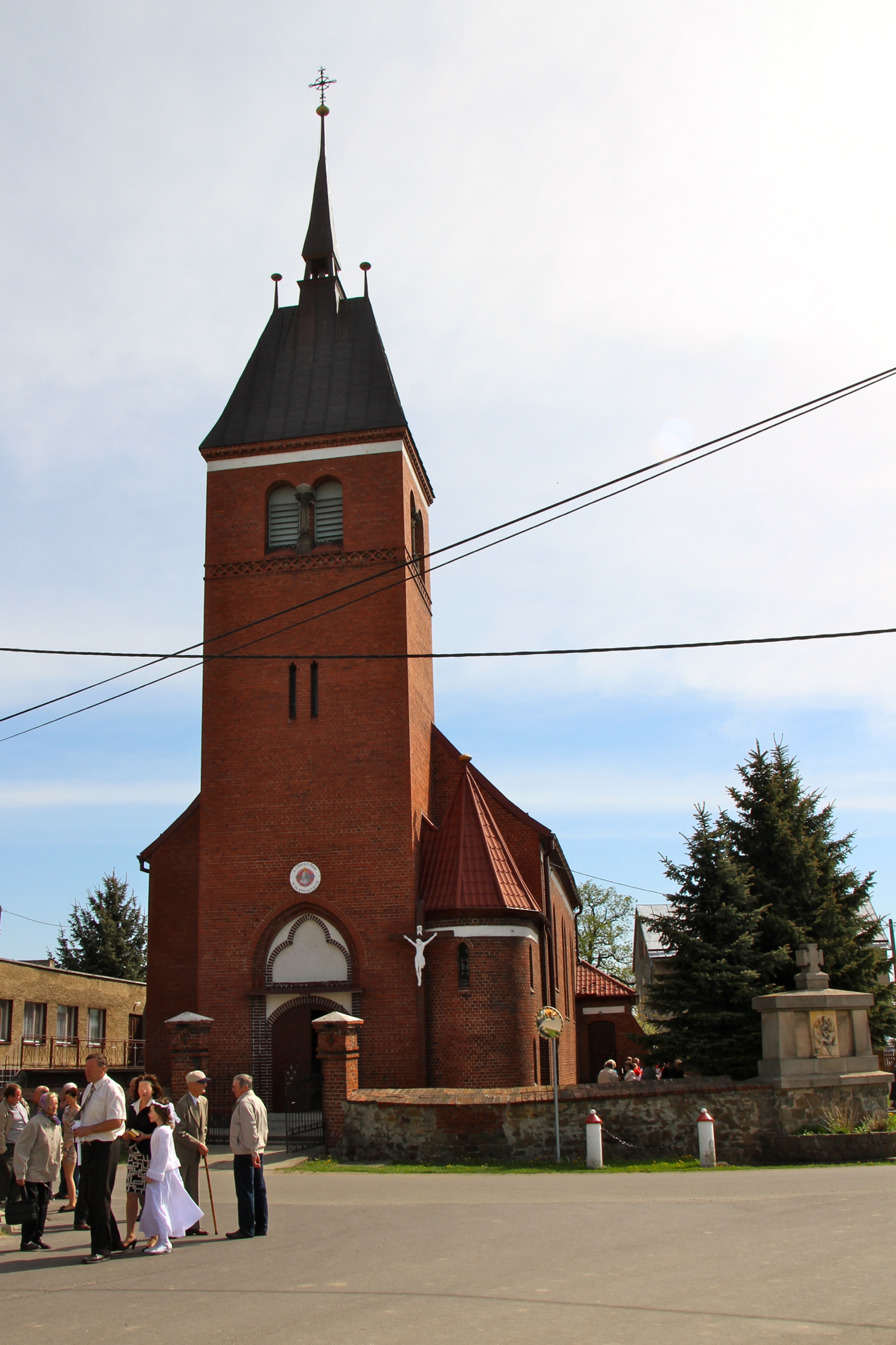

- Location within Poland
- Coordinates: 50°10′17″N 17°47′47″E
- Country: Poland
- Voivodeship: Opole
- County: Głubczyce
- Gmina: Głubczyce
- Time zone: UTC+1 (CET)
  - Summer (DST): UTC+2 (CEST)
- Area code: +48 77
- Car plates: OGL

Krzyżowice (Polish: [kʂɨʐɔˈvit͡sɛ]; German: Kreisewitz [kʁaɪzevɪt͡s]; Czech: Křižovany [kr̝̊ɪʒovanɪ]) is a village located in Poland, in the Opole Voivodeship, Głubczyce County and Gmina Głubczyce.
