= Bielany Wrocławskie =

- Village
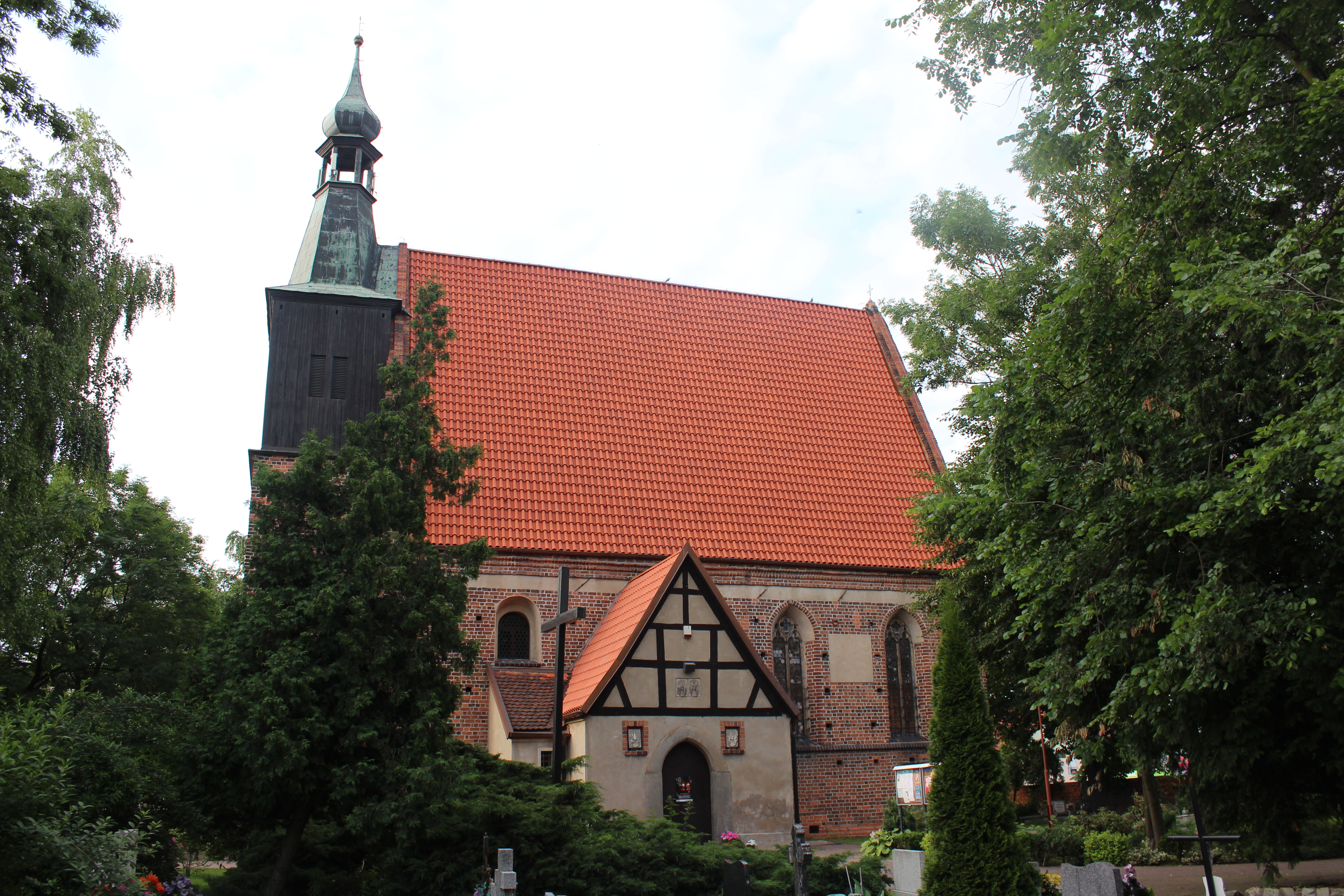
- St Andrew's Church

- Location within Poland
- Coordinates: 51°2′N 16°58′E
- Country: Poland
- Voivodeship: Lower Silesian
- County: Wrocław
- Gmina: Kobierzyce

Population
  - Total: 3,708 (2,017)
- Time zone: UTC+1 (CET)
  - Summer (DST): UTC+2 (CEST)
- Vehicle registration: DWR

Bielany Wrocławskie (Polish: [bjɛˈlanɨ vrɔˈt͡swafskʲɛ]) is a village in the administrative district of Council Gmina Kobierzyce, within Wrocław County, Lower Silesian Voivodeship, in south-western Poland.

== Transport ==
The A4 motorway and national routes 5 and 8 meet at a cloverleaf junction at Bielany Wroclawskie. In the resort, near the border with Wrocław is the largest shopping mall in Poland.
