= Gmina Kobierzyce =

Gmina Kobierzyce Kobierzyce Commune
- Gmina
- Flag Coat of arms
- Interactive map of Gmina Kobierzyce
- Coordinates (Kobierzyce): 50°58′N 16°55′E
- Country: Poland
- Voivodeship: Lower Silesian
- County: Wrocław
- Seat: Kobierzyce
- Sołectwos: Bąki, Bielany Wrocławskie, Biskupice Podgórne, Budziszów, Chrzanów-Magnice, Cieszyce, Damianowice, Dobkowice, Domasław, Jaszowice, Kobierzyce, Królikowice-Nowiny, Krzyżowice, Księginice, Kuklice, Małuszów, Owsianka, Pełczyce, Pustków Wilczkowski, Pustków Żurawski, Rolantowice, Ślęza, Solna, Szczepankowice, Tyniec Mały, Tyniec nad Ślęzą, Wierzbice, Wysoka, Żerniki Małe-Racławice Wielkie, Żurawice

Area
  - Total: 149.11 km^{2} (57.57 sq mi)

Population (2019-06-30)
  - Total: 21,503
  - Density: 144.21/km^{2} (373.50/sq mi)
- Website: https://www.ugk.pl

Gmina Kobierzyce is a rural gmina (municipality / commune) in Wrocław County, Lower Silesian Voivodeship, in south-western Poland. Its seat is the town of Kobierzyce.

The gmina covers an area of 149.11 square kilometres (57.6 sq mi), and as of 2020 its total population is 22,154. It is part of the Wrocław metropolitan area.

The gmina has a revenue per capita of 8096 PLN (~$3000) and is one of the highest results in Poland. Gmina Kobierzyce borders Wrocław. In the northern part (on the edge of Bielany Wrocławskie) one of the biggest shopping centres in Poland (Aleja Bielany) can be found. Near the Biskupice Podgórne there is an LG-Philips factory, which produces liquid crystal visual display units, and a Toshiba Corporation site. The A4 and A8 motorways and E67 and E261 European routes pass through the gmina.

== Neighbouring gminas ==
Gmina Kobierzyce is bordered by the town of Wrocław and the gminas of Borów, Jordanów Śląski, Kąty Wrocławskie, Siechnice, Sobótka and Żórawina.

== Villages ==
The gmina contains the villages of Bąki, Bielany Wrocławskie, Biskupice Podgórne, Budziszów, Chrzanów, Cieszyce, Damianowice, Dobkowice, Domasław, Jaszowice, Kobierzyce, Królikowice, Krzyżowice, Księginice, Kuklice, Magnice, Małuszów, Nowiny, Owsianka, Pełczyce, Pustków Wilczkowski, Pustków Żurawski, Racławice Wielkie, Rolantowice, Ślęza, Solna, Szczepankowice, Tyniec Mały, Tyniec nad Ślęzą, Wierzbice, Wysoka, Żerniki Małe and Żurawice.
