= Żuraw =

Żuraw may refer to:

== Places ==
- Żuraw, Łódź Voivodeship, a village in Sieradz County, Łódź Voivodeship, Poland
- Żuraw, Silesian Voivodeship, a village in Częstochowa County, Silesian Voivodeship, Poland

== People with the surname ==
- Dariusz Żuraw (born 1972), Polish footballer and manager
