= Żurawice, Lower Silesian Voivodeship =

Żurawice
- Village
- Location within Poland
- Coordinates: 50°58′16″N 16°51′07″E
- Country: Poland
- Voivodeship: Lower Silesian
- County: Wrocław
- Gmina: Kobierzyce

Żurawice [ʐuraˈvit͡sɛ] is a village in the administrative district of Gmina Kobierzyce, within Wrocław County, Lower Silesian Voivodeship, in south-western Poland.
