= Jaszowice, Lower Silesian Voivodeship =

Jaszowice
- Village
- Location within Poland
- Coordinates: 50°55′04″N 16°53′35″E
- Country: Poland
- Voivodeship: Lower Silesian
- County: Wrocław
- Gmina: Kobierzyce
- Population: 150

Jaszowice [jaʂɔˈvit͡sɛ] is a village in the administrative district of Gmina Kobierzyce, within Wrocław County, Lower Silesian Voivodeship, in south-western Poland.
